= Alfa Romeo Scighera =

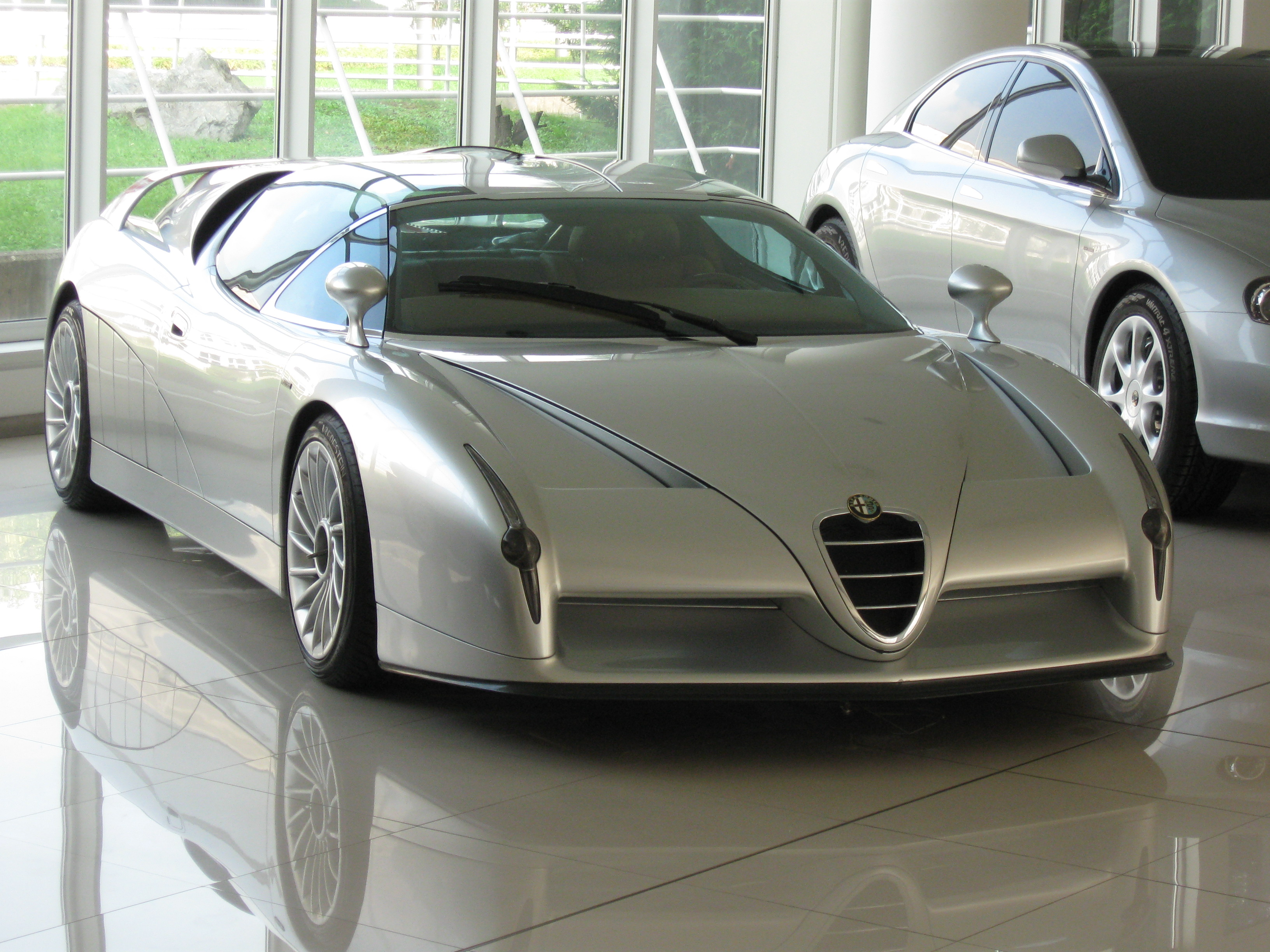

Overview
- Manufacturer: Italdesign Giugiaro
- Also called: Italdesign Scighera
- Production: 1997
- Assembly: Turin, Italy
- Designer: Fabrizio Giugiaro at Italdesign

Body and chassis
- Class: Concept car
- Body style: 2-door coupé
- Platform: Mid-engine, all wheel drive
- Related: Alfa Romeo 164; Alfa Romeo 155

Powertrain
- Engine: 3.0 L (2959 cc) Alfa Romeo twin-turbocharged V6
- Transmission: 6-speed sequential manual

Dimensions
- Wheelbase: 2,590.8 mm (102.00 in)
- Length: 4,318 mm (170.00 in)
- Width: 1,981.2 mm (78.00 in)
- Height: 1,143 mm (45.00 in)
- Curb weight: 1,447 kg (3,190 lb)

The Alfa Romeo Scighera is a functional, futuristically styled concept car designed by Fabrizio Giugiaro and manufactured by Italdesign of Turin, Italy in 1997 for automobile manufacturer Alfa Romeo. The name "Scighera" means mist in the Milanese dialect.

== Design ==
The Scighera was conceived by Italdesign as a homage to Alfa Romeo's racing history and was designed to be a race car drives let on the road. The design combines modern and classic design elements. The front of the car draws inspiration from Formula One cars' front wing which has a low slung design and an integrated wing on the buttress in order to create downforce. The V shape of the front mimics that of the Alfa Romeo logo. Due to the integrated wing, the car had thin headlamps that were infamously called "clown-eyes".

The windshield of the car was inspired from Alfa Romeo's race cars of the 1950s and 60s and extended to the side of the car. The doors had the unique opening mechanism borrowed by the Nazca C2 which incorporated a conventional outward opening door with a window opening in a gull-wing arrangement. The windows were removable, making the car convertible to an open top two-seater. The gull-wing setup was electronically operated.

The large engine cover and the rear wing are a single carbon fibre piece, allowing easy access to the mechanical components of the car. The thin tail lights are joined by a third brake light integrated into the rear wing. The engine cover opens in two steps. The first step allows the driver to refuel the car while the second step allows access to the engine.

== Specifications ==
The Scighera is based on the 164, and has an all aluminium body, the frame structure is made of aluminium-carbon fibre composite, and powered by an Alfa Romeo 3.0 L (180 cu in) twin-turbocharged V6 engine. The engine produced a maximum power output of 400 hp (298 kW; 406 PS) at 7,500 rpm and 327 lb⋅ft (443 N⋅m) of torque. The all wheel drive system was derived from the 155. The interior of the car had Connolly leather upholstery.

== Production and performance ==
The car can accelerate from 0-60 mph (97 km/h) in 3.7 seconds and had a top speed of 186 mph (299 km/h).

Italdesign intended to enter the Scighera into racing and even built a racing version of the car which had a bare interior, a large fixed rear wing, and did away with the gull-wing mechanism. They were considering a small-scale production for homologation, but it never came to fruition.

== In media ==
The car is featured in the 1998 racing video game Need for Speed III: Hot Pursuit as the Italdesign Scighera, exclusively in the PC version. The PlayStation version features the Nazca C2 instead.
