= Italdesign Aztec =

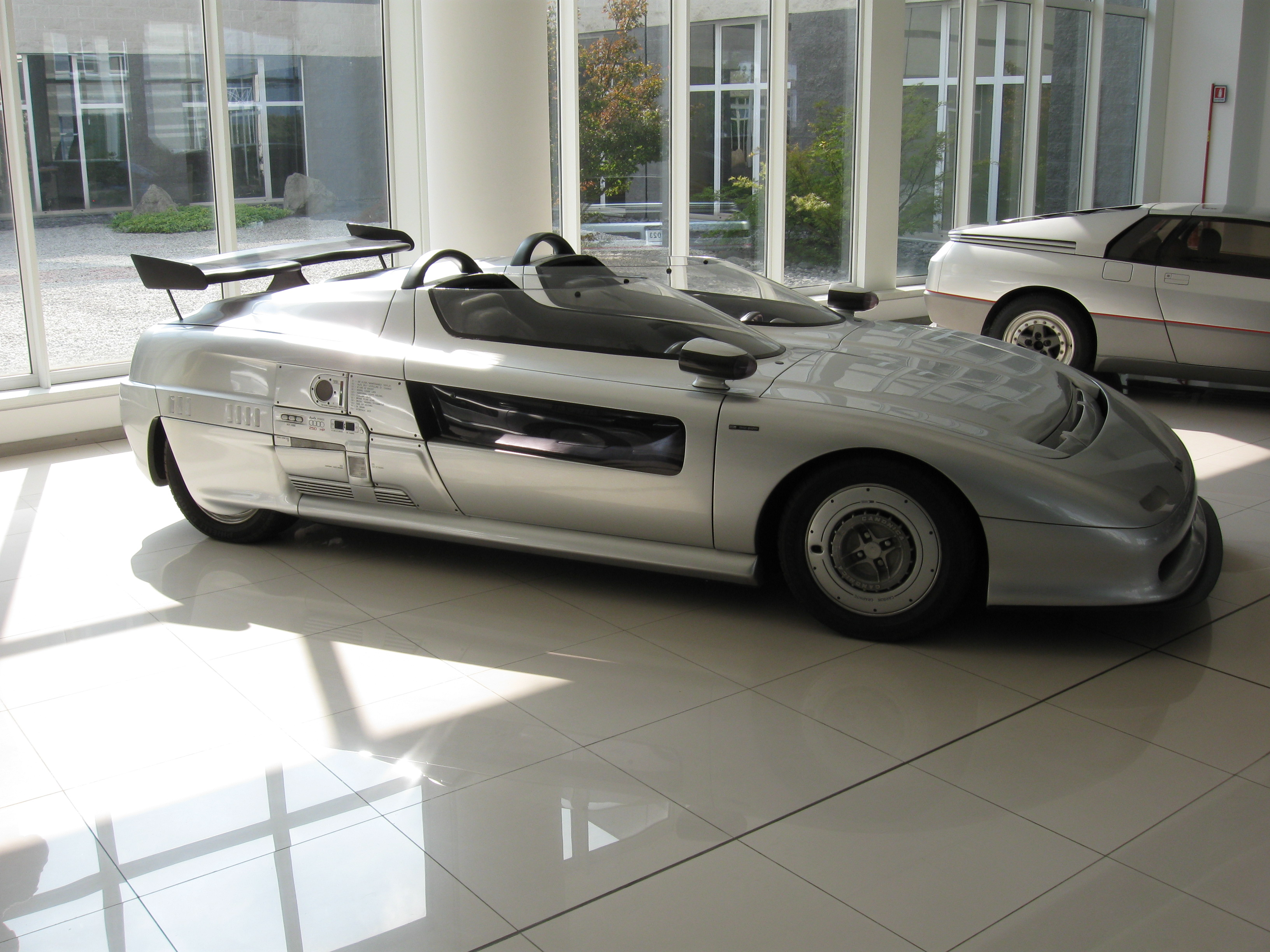

Overview
- Manufacturer: Italdesign Giugiaro; Carrozzeria Savio
- Also called: Audi Aztec
- Production: 1988–1992 (18 reportedly produced)
- Assembly: Turin, Italy
- Designer: Giorgetto Giugiaro at Italdesign

Body and chassis
- Class: Sports car (S)
- Body style: 2-door speedster
- Layout: Longitudinal mid engine, four-wheel drive

Powertrain
- Engine: 2.2 L (2,226 cc) Audi MB/1B turbocharged DOHC I5
- Transmission: 5-speed manual

Dimensions
- Wheelbase: 2,601 mm (102 in)
- Length: 4,270 mm (168 in)
- Width: 1,971 mm (78 in)
- Height: 1,175 mm (46 in)

The Aztec is a sports car introduced by Italdesign at the 1988 Turin Motor Show, to celebrate the twentieth anniversary of the establishment of the firm. The two-seater is unique because the driver and passenger are separated, requiring the two parties to communicate electronically. It incorporates a speedster body style with partial visor sections which are removable and open in a gull-wing arrangement. It was fitted with a turbocharged Audi engine mated to a four-wheel-drive system derived from the Lancia Delta HF Integrale.

A Turin-based trading company called Compact srl bought the rights to the Aztec and planned to build 50 examples, to be sold exclusively in Japan. Carrozzeria Savio was contracted to build the cars. According to most sources only 18 cars were ever built, although some sources simply state the production number as "less than 25".

== Features ==
Italdesign's initial plan was for the Aztec to be fitted with Audi's then-new, 3.6-liter V8 engine. As the V8 was not completed in time, an Audi-sourced five-cylinder DOHC engine was used instead. It produces 200 PS (147 kW; 197 hp), although the car carried a prominent "250 HP" badge on the flank. Many cars were indeed fitted with boosted engines producing closer to that number.

The car incorporated futuristic styling cues with many features ahead of its time. The car had control panels on both sides of the car at the aluminium body panels at the rear and upon entering certain codes into the panel, information and about the car's performance status along with certain functions of the car (i.e., an extra set of lights, hydraulic jack, removable screw driver, a fire extinguisher, a compressor for inflating tires and a flashlight) could be accessed via a voice message. Inside of the car, the car was wrapped in a leather interior and there was a separate instrument cluster for the passenger shaped like a steering wheel displaying vital information about the car and containing damper controls and communication controls along with engine timing controls. The car also incorporated a satellite navigation system located in the centre of the dashboard (positioned more towards the driver). The design of the car is inspired by the space technology rather than the organic technologies used in that era while the LeMans inspired wing mirrors gave a nod to the aspects of motorsport. The car incorporated an adequate luggage compartment in order to carry the normal luggage of the occupants while being true to its futuristic theme. A carbon fibre rear wing optimised for downforce and roll-bars for safety of the occupants were also installed.

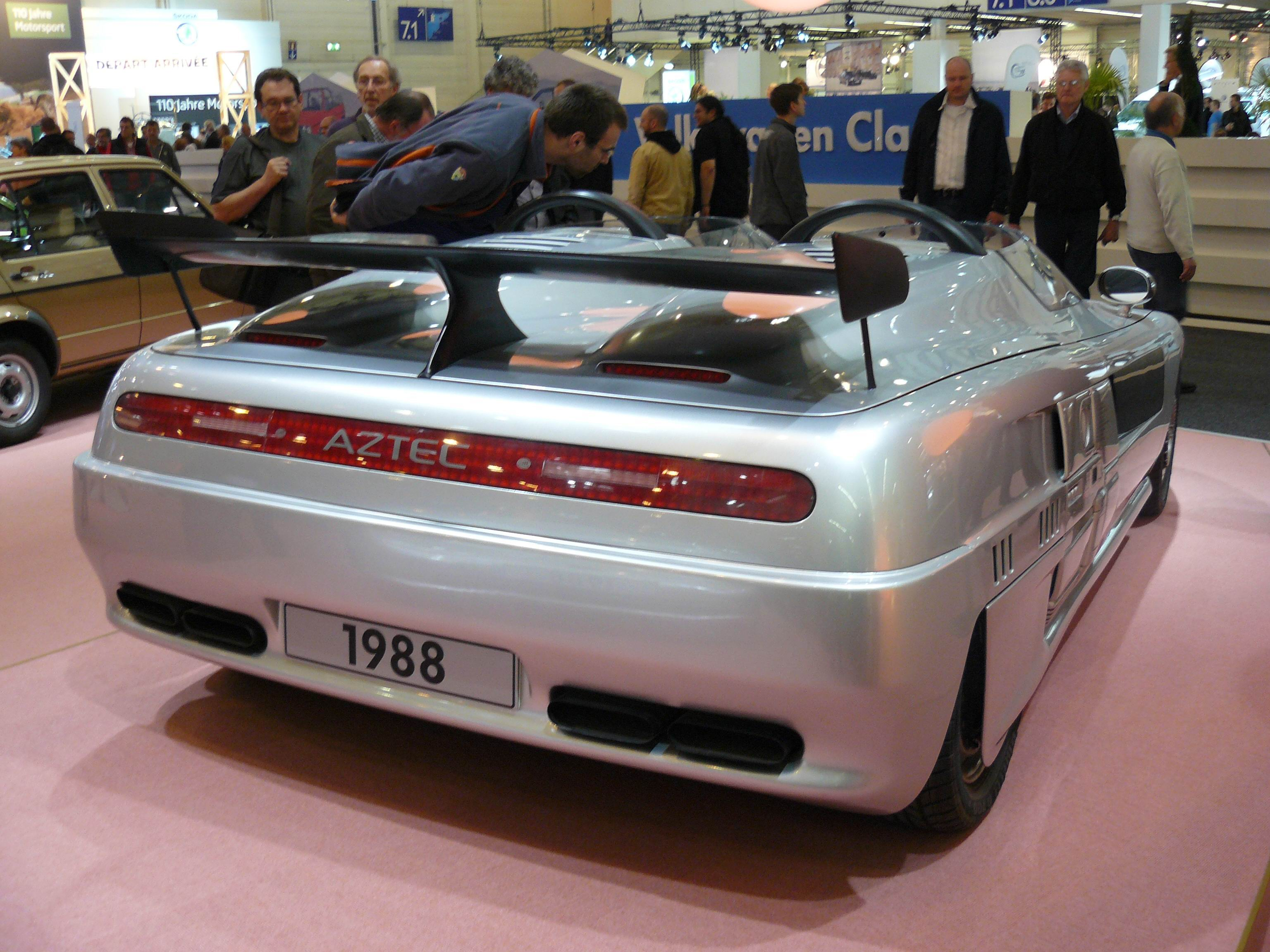
1988 Italdesign Aztec (rear)

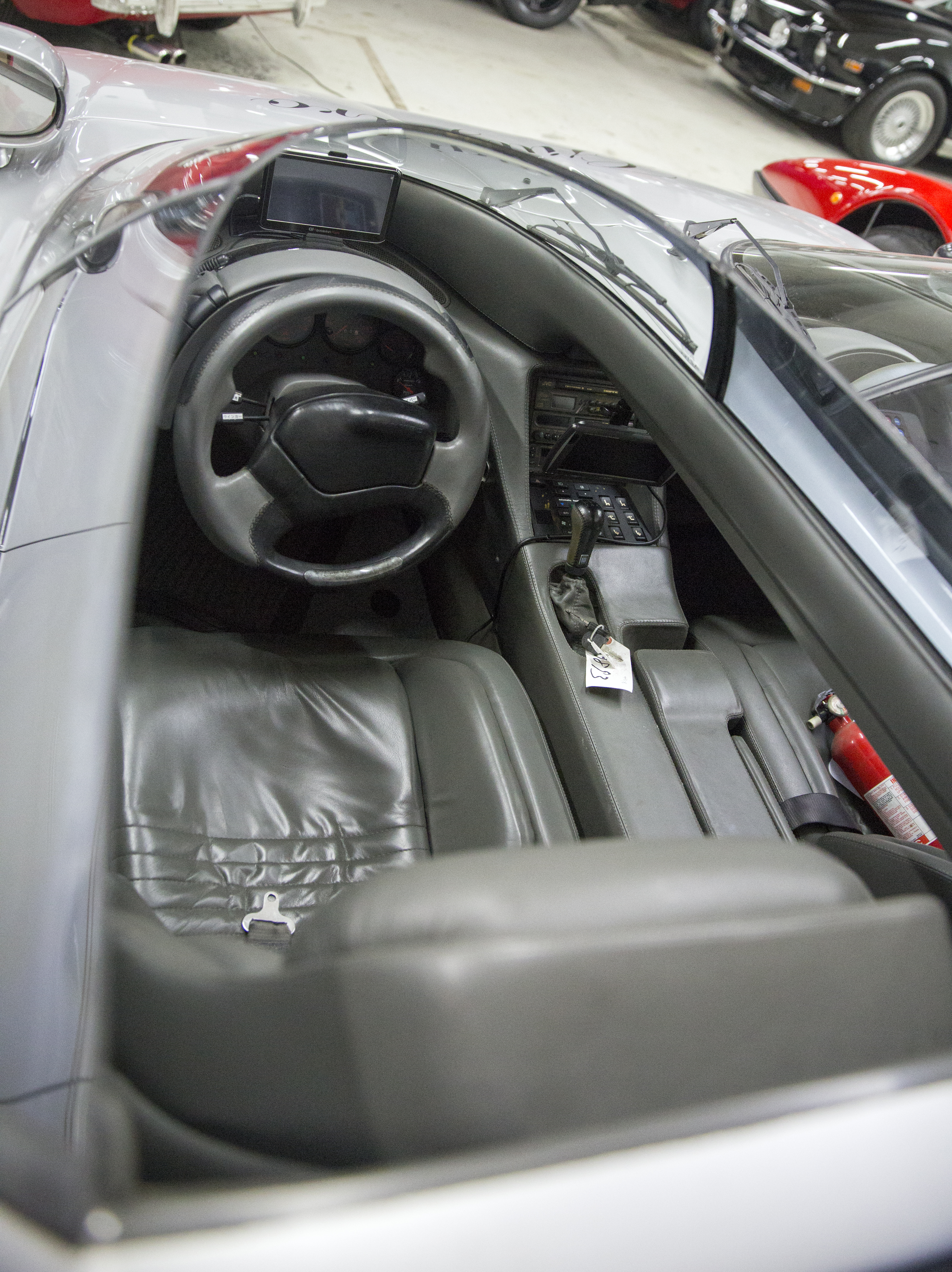
The Aztec's cockpit

== In film ==
The Italdesign Aztec appeared in the 1990 science fiction horror movie Frankenstein Unbound as the computer-controlled futuristic car of the movie's protagonist, Dr. Joe Buchanan. It made its second film appearance in the 1996 Italian science fiction comedy movie A spasso nel tempo alongside the BMW Nazca C2 and the Italdesign Machimoto concept cars.
