= Ford Maya =

1984 concept car built by Italdesign

Overview
- Also called: Italdesign Maya
- Production: 1984
- Designer: Giorgetto Giugiaro at Italdesign

Body and chassis
- Class: Concept car
- Body style: 2-door targa top
- Layout: RMR layout

Powertrain
- Engine: 3.0 L V6
- Transmission: 5-speed manual

The Ford Maya is a concept car designed and built by Italdesign for Ford. It debuted in 1984 at the Turin Motor Show.

== History ==
The Maya was designed to test the waters for a 2-seater, targa top sports car for the U.S. market. Ford had planned to put the Maya into production, building 50 units per day (about 12,000 per year), and as such the concept was built to be fully functional. The design was criticized for being too similar to the Giugiaro designed Lotus Etna concept unveiled that same year.

== Specifications ==
The Maya is powered by a mid-mounted Ford V6 engine producing 140 hp (104 kW; 142 PS), although this was a placeholder for a Yamaha co-developed 3.0 L V6 engine producing 250 hp (186 kW; 253 PS) that Ford had intended to put into the production model. That power is sent to the rear wheels through a 5-speed manual transmission. The Giugiaro wedge design gives it a drag coefficient of 0.28 cx. The interior features twin leather bucket seats, space for luggage behind the seats and most of the buttons for car controls mounted on the steering wheel. As it was built for the U.S. market, it features a soft plastic, deformable front bumper.

== Maya II ES ==
In 1985, after the first Maya concept had been unveiled, Ford requested that a second car be built, called the Maya II ES. At the request of Ford, the ES features a modified design with smoother lines and a central air intake inspired by Ferrari models of the time. Ford requested the concept be painted in flaming red, but as soon as the car returned to Italdesign, it was repainted in two different shades of metal grey.

== Maya II EM ==
The same year that the Maya II ES was built, Ford requested that Italdesign build a third prototype, which was called the Maya II EM. The EM was finished in July 1985, it was built to test the concept in normal road conditions. It features a modified design with a notchback rear end and a new, longitudinally mounted biturbo 3.0 L V6 engine producing 300 hp (224 kW; 304 PS).
