= Porsche Tapiro =

Concept car designed by Giorgetto Giugiaro

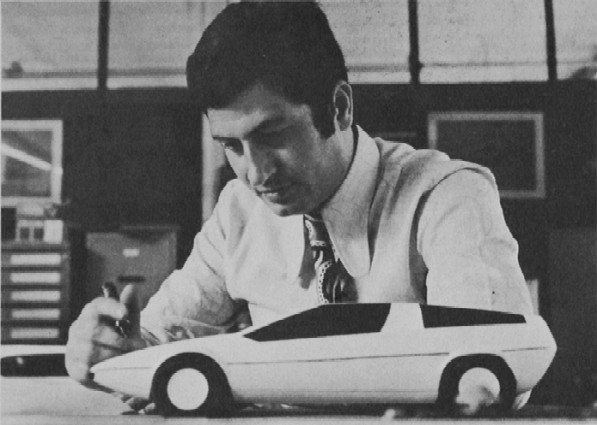
- Giorgetto Giugiaro with a scale model of the Porsche Tapiro

Overview
- Manufacturer: Porsche
- Production: 1970 (1 built)
- Designer: Giorgetto Giugiaro (Italdesign)

Body and chassis
- Class: Sports car
- Layout: Rear mid-engine, rear-wheel drive
- Related: Porsche 914/6

Powertrain
- Engine: 2.4 L flat-six
- Transmission: 5-speed manual

The Porsche Tapiro is a concept car built by Italdesign in 1970. It was designed by Giorgetto Giugiaro and has a traditional 1970s wedge design, which critics say somewhat resembles that of the De Tomaso Mangusta. The chassis is based on the Porsche 914/6, and it features gullwing-style doors.

== Specifications ==
The Tapiro is powered by a longitudinally mounted, air-cooled 2.4-liter flat-six engine that produced 164 kW (220 hp; 217 PS) at 7,800 rpm, and is linked to a 5-speed manual transmission. This engine could propel the Tapiro to an official top speed of 152 mph (245 km/h).

== History ==
The Porsche Tapiro was introduced to the world at the 1970 Turin Auto Show, in Turin, Italy. The car made its US debut at the 5th Annual Los Angeles Imported Automobile and Sports Car Show in 1971.

In 1972, the car was sold to a Spanish industrialist who used it as his daily driver. The car was mostly destroyed after it caught fire. Most sources say the cause of the fire was a group of labor activists protesting its owner's labor policies, who planted a bomb under the Tapiro. The bomb exploded, burning the car but not destroying the chassis. Other sources say the car was involved in an accident and caught fire that way. The burnt shell was repurchased by the engineering and design company Italdesign, and was on display in its Giugiaro Museum until 2020.
