= Italdesign Brivido =

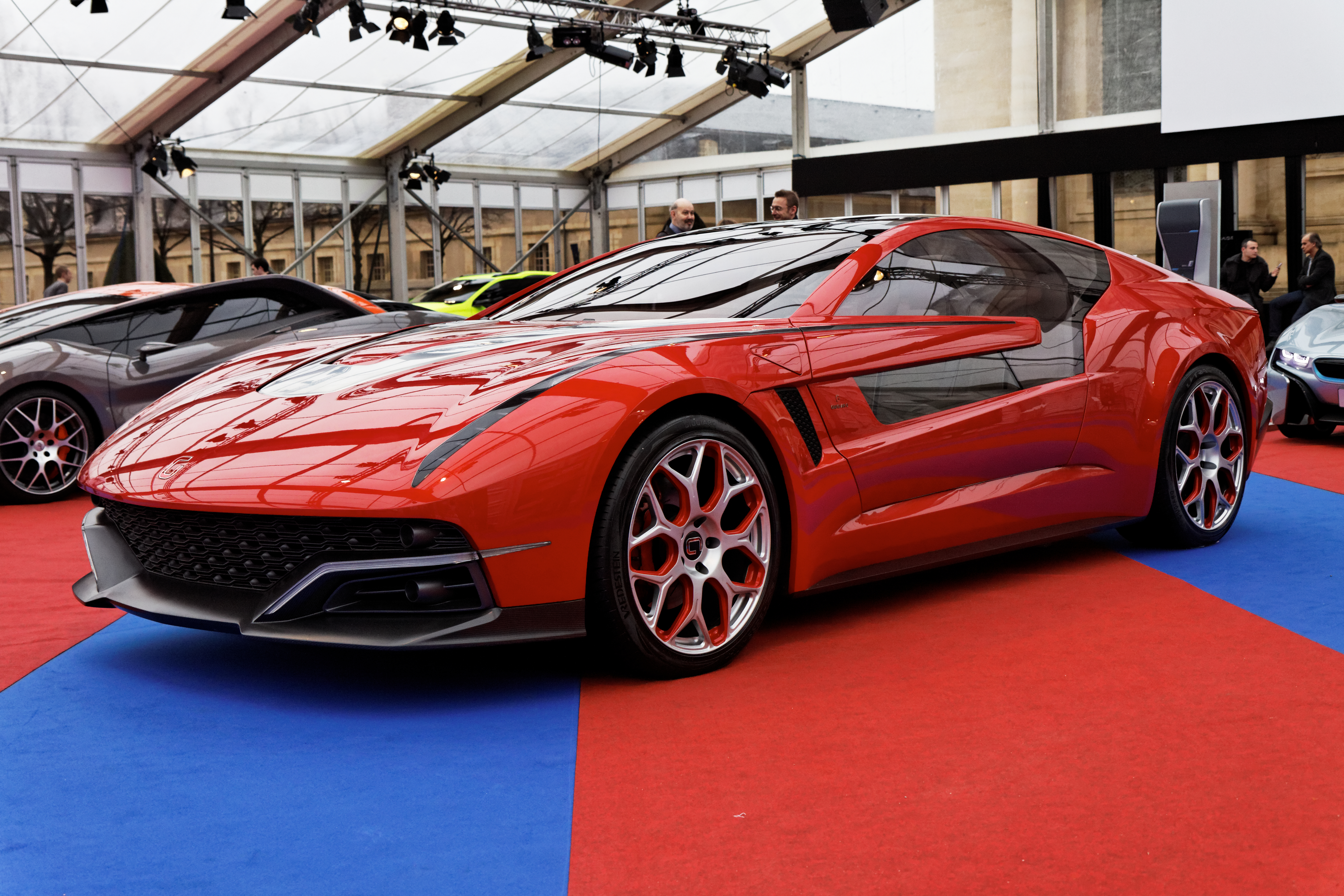
- The Brivido at the Festival Automobile International.

Overview
- Manufacturer: Italdesign Giugiaro
- Production: 2012

Body and chassis
- Class: Concept car
- Body style: 2-door 4-Seat Coupe
- Layout: Front-engined, rear-wheel-drive
- Doors: Gull-wing

Powertrain
- Engine: 3.0 L supercharged V6
- Electric motor: 2x asynchronous electric motors
- Transmission: 8-speed automatic

The Italdesign Brivido is a hybrid sports car concept made by Italian design house Italdesign Giugiaro. It is not slated to go into production. Giugiaro says it is designed to give supercar-like performance while helping protect the earth. It was introduced in 2012 at the Geneva Motor Show.

== Features ==
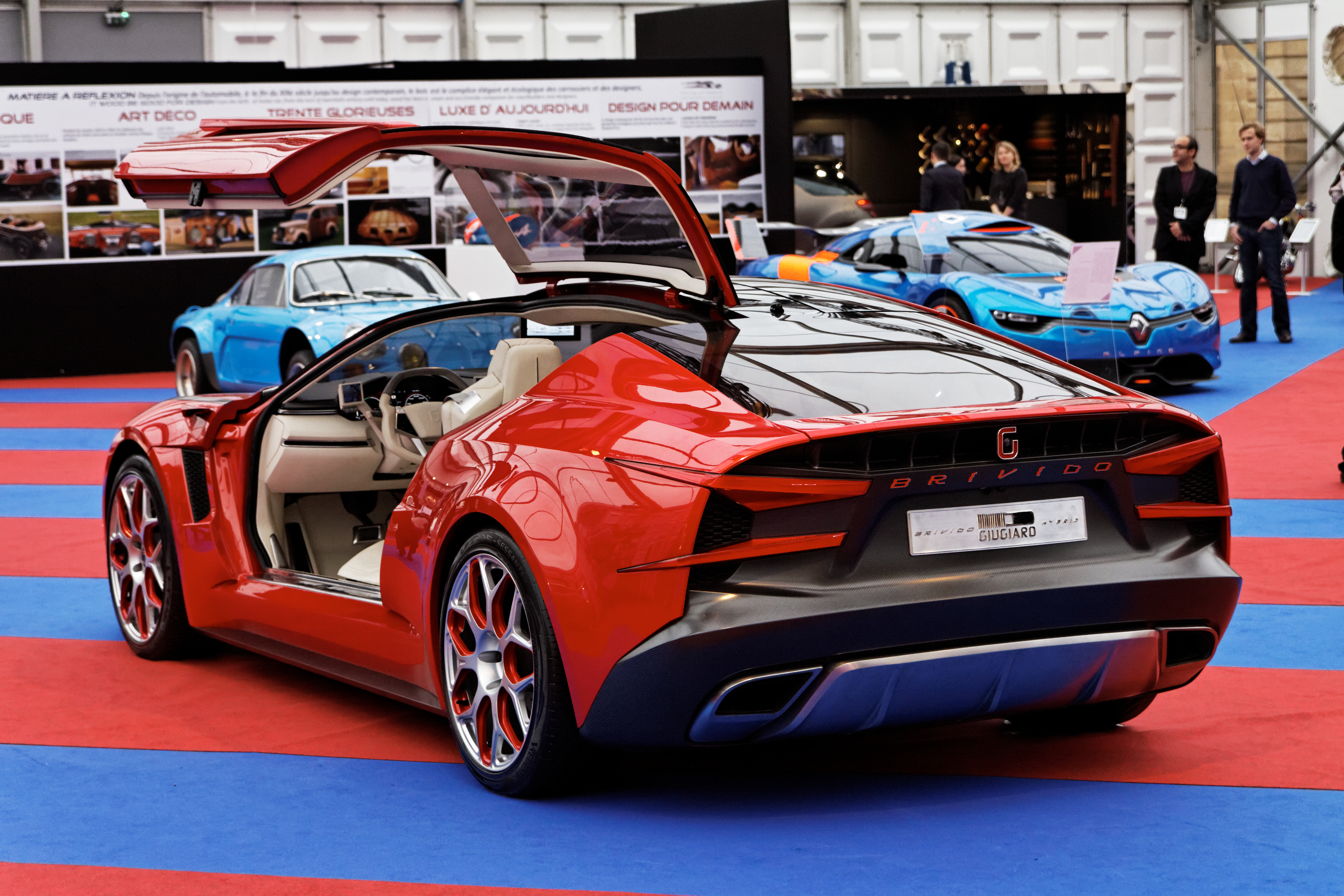
Rear view

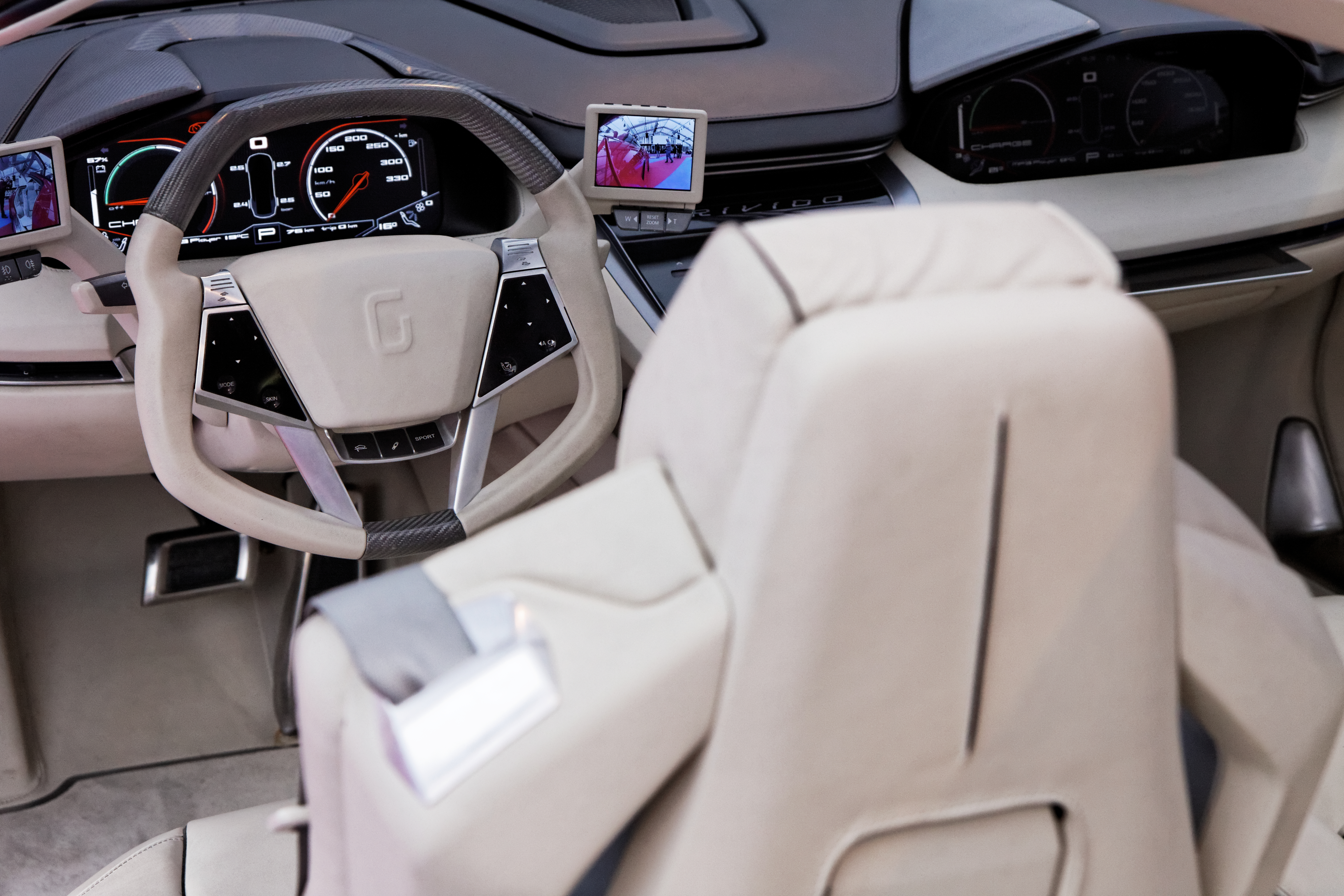
Interior

One of the Brivido's conceptual features is its side mirrors which, rather than being actual side mirrors, are cameras which connect to small displays either side of the steering wheel. It also has a 3D infotainment system with 3D glasses. The concept car is painted in Xirallic pearl lustre red. The interior is sewn with raw cut skins. It also has gull-wing doors with inbuilt cushions, which allow for easy access of the front and rear seats. The Brivido was one of the first cars in the world to have headlight clusters. Giorgetto Giugiaro stated about the car: "This is a quest for a genuine four seater to offer comfort and visibility."

== Performance ==
The Brivido is powered by a hybrid system with a supercharged 3.0 liter V6 engine that produces 360 hp (268 kW) and 339 lb⋅ft (460 N⋅m) of torque, and an electric motor that provides even more power (the exact amount produced by the electric motor is unknown). Power goes to the wheels through an 8-speed automatic transmission. It has claimed a top speed of 275 km/h (170.8 mph) and can reach 100 km/h (62 mph) from a standstill in 5.8 seconds. It also has a lightweight body made of only carbon fiber, glass and aluminium.
