= Giugiaro Ford Mustang =

Ford Mustang Giugiaro
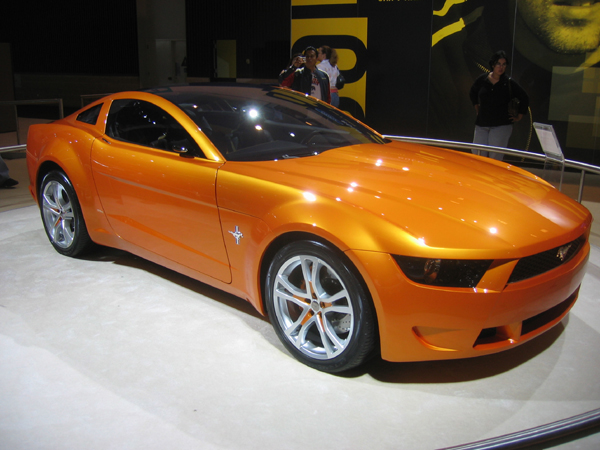

Overview
- Manufacturer: Ford Motor Company
- Production: 2006
- Assembly: Flat Rock, Michigan, United States
- Designer: Fabrizio Giugiaro at Italdesign

Body and chassis
- Class: Concept pony/muscle car
- Body style: 2-door fastback coupé
- Layout: FR layout
- Doors: Scissor
- Related: Ford Mustang (fifth generation); Ford Mustang (sixth generation)

Powertrain
- Engine: 4.6 L supercharged Modular V8, 500 hp (373 kW)
- Transmission: 5-speed Tremec TR-3650 manual

Dimensions
- Wheelbase: 107.1 in (2,720 mm)
- Length: 188.8 in (4,800 mm)
- Width: 77.2 in (1,960 mm)
- Height: 53 in (1,300 mm)

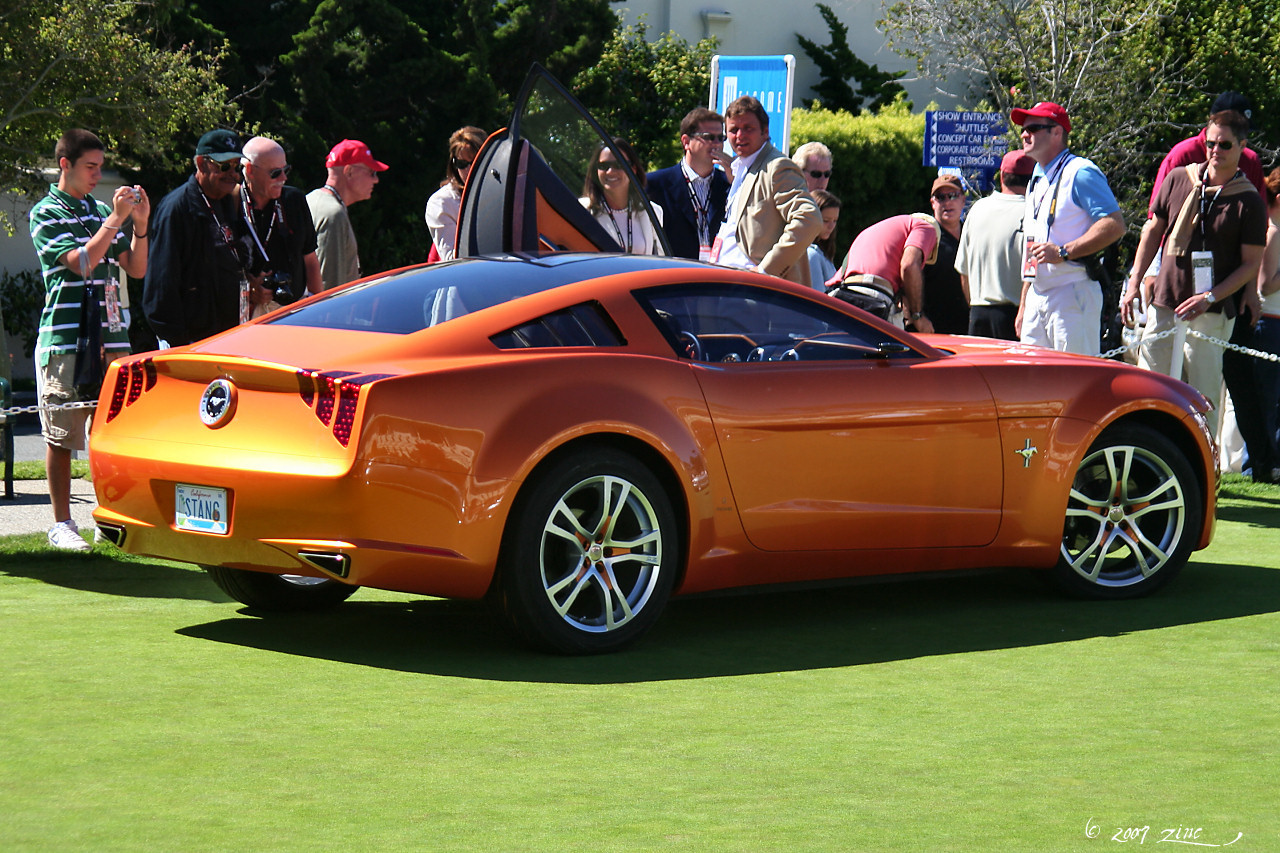
Rear view

The Giugiaro Mustang is a concept car based on the production fifth generation Ford Mustang that debuted at the 2006 Los Angeles International Auto Show. It was designed by Italdesign Giugiaro under Fabrizio Giugiaro, Giorgetto Giugiaro's son. The 2015 Ford Mustang takes many design cues from the concept car.

== Styling ==
In 2005, Fabrizio Giugiaro, the styling director of Italdesign Giugiaro, went to Ford to design a future concept inspired by the fifth generation Ford Mustang. This follows the pattern of Giorgetto Giugiaro, who was instrumental in designing the 1965 Bertone Mustang, as well as the Chevrolet Corvette Moray. It is the younger automobile designer's interpretation of European styling on the 2005 version of the American pony car.

Italdesign Giugiaro changed the styling and design of both the interior as well as the exterior. The final concept of the vehicle is more compact and tapered with a smaller rear overhang, but is wider by 30 mm (1.2 in) at the front, and by 80 mm (3.1 in) at the rear. A single pane forms the windshield as well as the roof, which is made from a type of crystal that filters out all UV rays, yet does not polarize visible light. The doors are touch operated and when opened raise from the A-pillar at a 45-degree angle, similar to the classic Lamborghini's scissor doors. Inside, the interior is trimmed with aluminum and leather. The dashboard, door panels, dials and knobs, instrument cluster, as well as gear lever have been completely redesigned. The car also utilizes reverse cameras on both doors in place of conventional side view mirrors. New periscope-style air conditioning vents, along with a new seat trim, harkens to the pony car's name with furred horse hides.

== Engineering ==
The Giugiaro Mustang is powered by the 4.6 L V8 from the Mustang GT, but receives additional power from a twin-screw supercharger. The engine is tuned by Italdesign Giugiaro, fitted with fuel injectors from the Ford GT, and has a larger air intake with 95 mm (3.7 in) mass air meter and a conical air filter. Exhaust flow is improved using an X-pipe and Ford Racing mufflers. The engine produces over 500 hp (373 kW) at 11 psi (0.8 bar) of boost from the supercharger.

The Giugiaro Mustang is equipped with a custom Ford Racing handling package, featuring new shock absorbers, lower springs, and thicker sway bars. These changes also lower the ride height by 1.5 inches (38 mm).
