= Italdesign Giugiaro =

Italian design and engineering company

Italdesign-Giugiaro S.p.A.
- Logo used since December 2022
- Trade name: Italdesign
- Formerly: Studi Italiani Realizzazione Prototipi
- Type: Joint venture
- Industry: Design
- Founded: February 13, 1968, in Turin, Italy
- Founders: Giorgetto Giugiaro; Aldo Mantovani
- Headquarters: Moncalieri, Italy
- Key people: Dirk Große-Loheide (chairman); Antonio Casu (CEO); Fabrizio Mina (CEO of Italdesign USA)
- Services: Styling, Engineering, Pre-Series, Testing & Validation, Industrial Design
- Revenue: €193 million (2015)
- Owners: UST; Automobili Lamborghini
- Number of employees: 917 (2019)
- Website: www.italdesign.it

Italdesign-Giugiaro S.p.A. (Italian pronunciation: [ˌitaldeˈzain dʒuˈdʒaːro]), or simply known as Italdesign, is an Italian design and engineering company and brand based in Moncalieri, that traces its roots to the 1968 foundation of Studi Italiani Realizzazione Prototipi S.p.A. by Giorgetto Giugiaro and Aldo Mantovani. Best known for its automobile design work, Italdesign also offers product design, project management, styling, packaging, engineering, modeling, prototyping and testing services to manufacturers worldwide. As of 2019, Italdesign employs 917 people.

On August 9, 2010, Lamborghini (part of the Volkswagen Group via its subsidiary Audi) acquired 90.1% of the shares of Italdesign-Giugiaro S.p.A., including the brand name rights and patents. The remaining shares were sold to Lamborghini on 28 June 2015, when Giorgetto Giugiaro resigned from the firm.

In 2025, Lamborghini sold its partial stake to the American tech company UST.

== History ==
=== Foundation ===
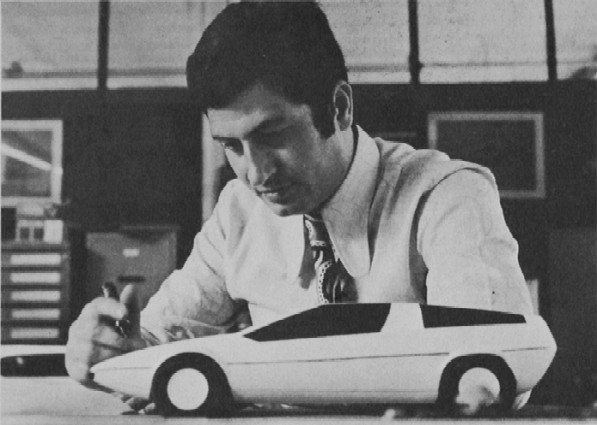
Giorgetto Giugiaro and the Porsche Tapiro, c. 1969/70

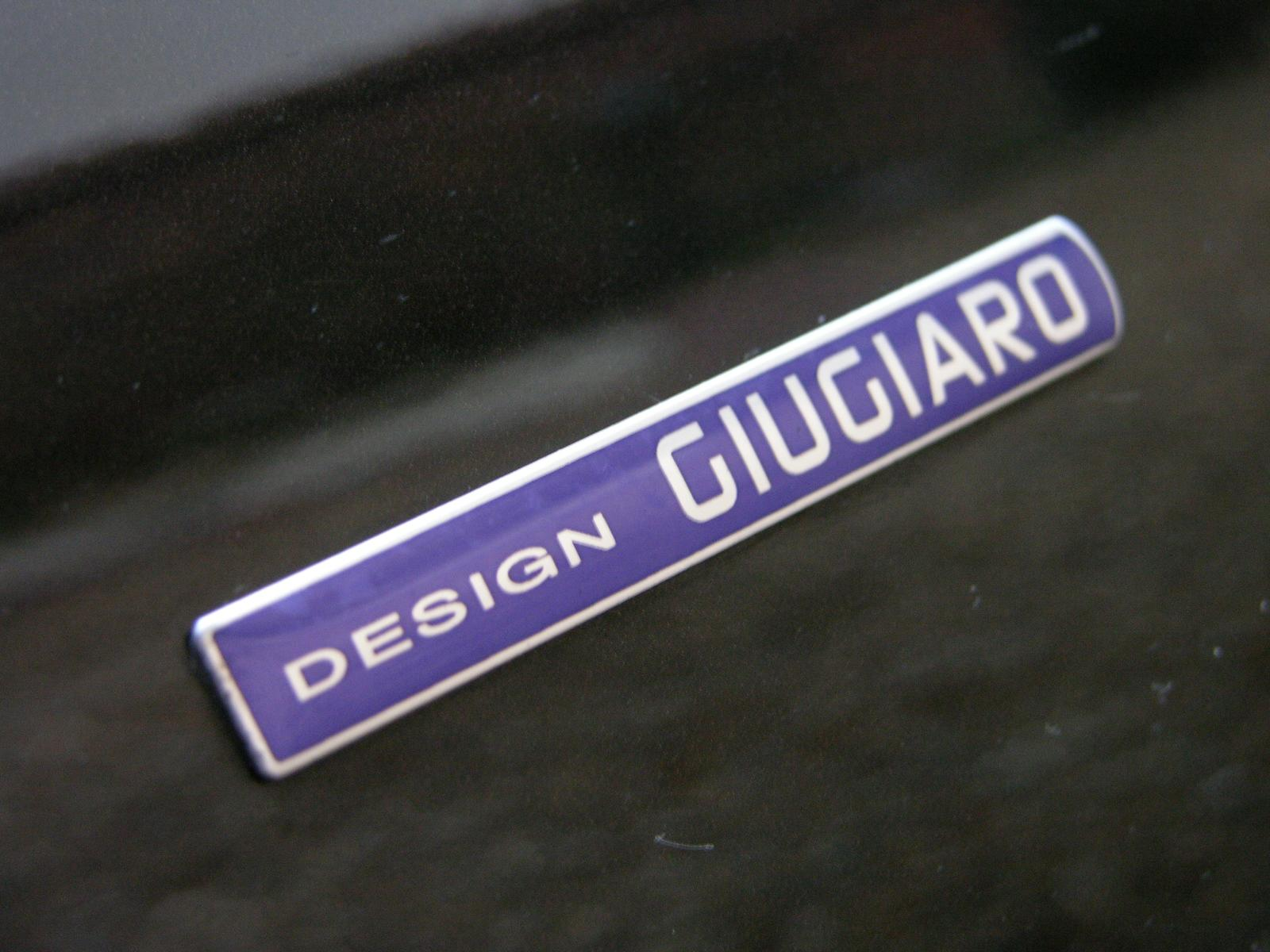
Giugiaro logo on a 2005 Maserati 4200 GT

Giorgetto Giugiaro and Aldo Mantovani founded Studi Italiani Realizzazione Prototipi S.p.A. (SIRP), the company that would eventually become Italdesign, on February 13, 1968, in Moncalieri, Italy.

=== Volkswagen ===
Volkswagen and Italdesign have a history of working together that dates back to the early 1970s.

Former Volkswagen Group Chairman Ferdinand Piëch apprenticed at Italdesign during the summer of 1972, learning about engineering and design. Italdesign is responsible for the design of several notable Volkswagen vehicles including the first generation Volkswagen Golf (1974), Volkswagen Scirocco (1974) and Volkswagen Passat (1973) and the Audi 80 (1974).

In May 2010, Italdesign agreed to transfer 90.1% of its shares to Audi's subsidiary Lamborghini Holding S.p.A. in order to keep Volkswagen's Italian holdings bundled together. The purchase price was not disclosed. The Giugiaro family retained ownership of the remaining shares. Both Giorgetto Giugiaro and his son, Fabrizio Giugiaro, continued to have active roles in the company. In July 2015 it was announced that Giorgetto Giugiaro had left and sold the remaining shares to Lamborghini.

=== Subsidiaries ===
Following a large-scale cooperation with SEAT - already dating back to the 1980s - Italdesign created a new firm, Diseño Industrial Italdesign Srl, in SEAT's hometown Barcelona, Spain, in 1992 to design and construct models, master models and prototypes for the Spanish manufacturing industry. This subsidiary became Italdesign Giugiaro Barcelona SL.

In 2017, the company founded a daughter company dedicated to building collector vehicles. Named Italdesign Automobili Speciali, the new brand is featured on all vehicles constructed in ultra low series production, aimed at a number of selected collectors. The first car produced was the Zerouno with a production of only five units.

== Automobili Speciali Cars ==
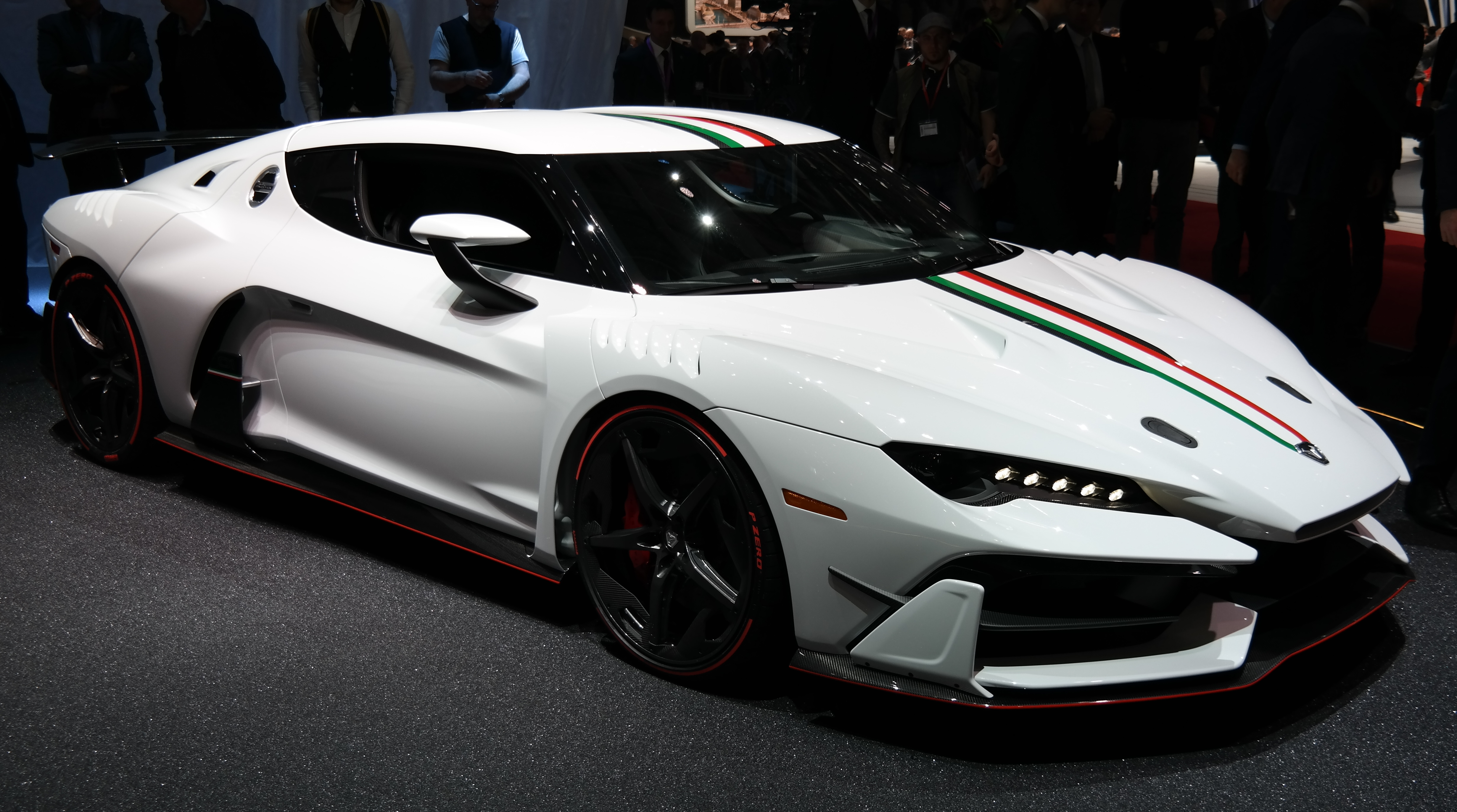
Italdesign Zerouno

Cars produced or planned by the new group.

AUTOMOBILI SPECIALI cars
Model	Year	built/planned
Italdesign Zerouno	2017	5/5
Italdesign Zerouno Duerta (Spider)	2018	?/5

=== Acquisitions ===
Italdesign acquired SALLIG, a company founded in 1960 that designs and builds acrylic, cast iron and zamak matrices for automotive, aeronautical and household appliance prototypes.

Italdesign acquired ETM (Engineering Technologies Methods), a company founded in 1984 that creates silicone prototypes, allowing the transition from an acrylic prototype to a more refined prototype with characteristics similar to the finished product.

== Organization ==
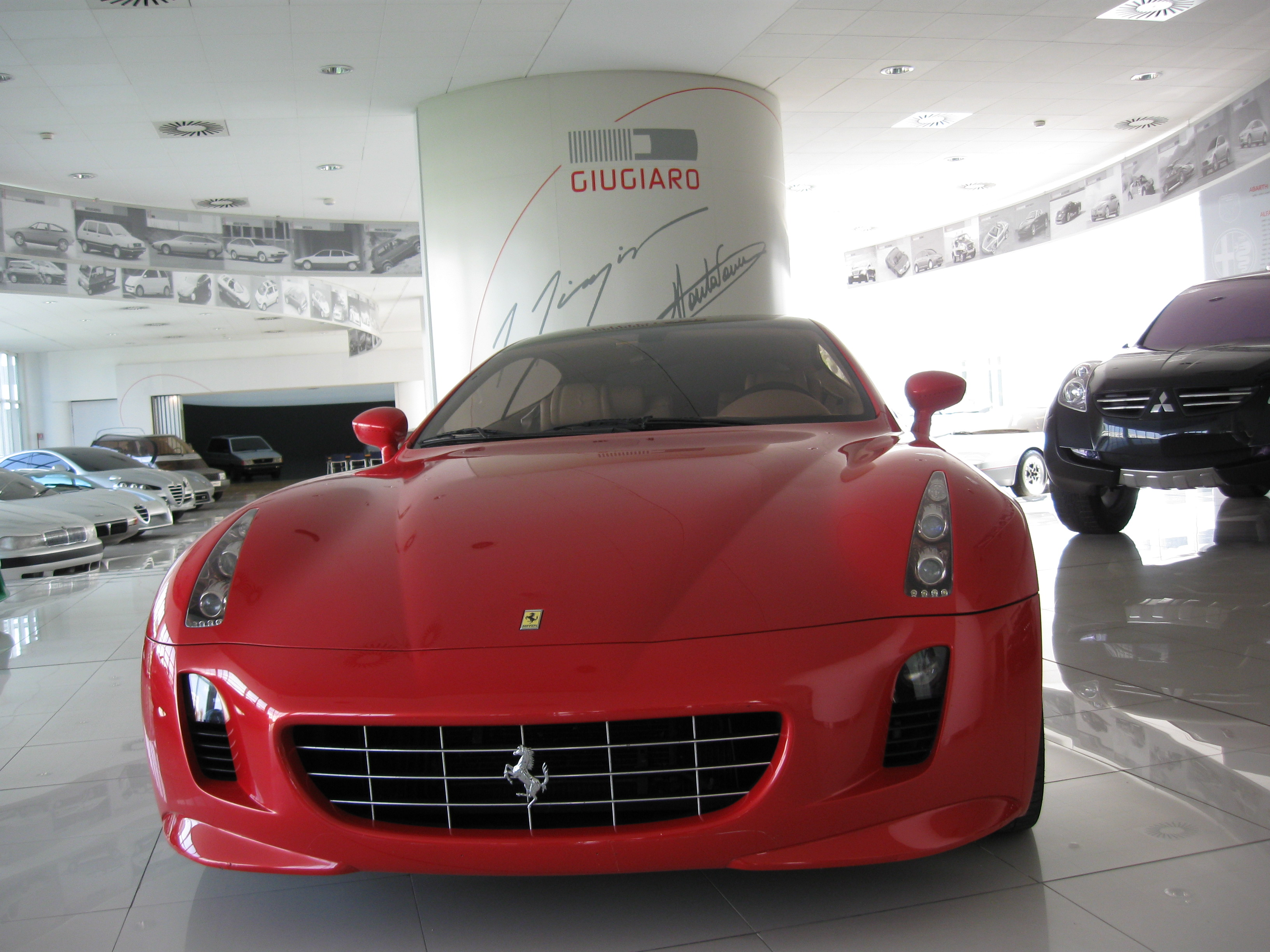
The 2005 Ferrari GG50 ("Giorgetto Giugiaro 50"), marking Giugiaro's 50 years in design. On display in the Italdesign-Giugiaro showroom in Moncalieri, Italy

Italdesign-Giugiaro S.p.A. is headquartered 10 km south of Turin, Italy, in Moncalieri. Best known for its automobile design work, Italdesign also offers project management, styling, packaging, engineering, modeling, prototyping and testing services.

Italdesign has 993 employees and generated over €193 million revenue in 2015.

Under Volkswagen Group ownership, Dirk Grosse-Loheide is the current Chairman and Antonio Casu is the CEO.

=== Previous CEOs ===
- Giorgetto Giugiaro (1968–2010)
- Jörg Astalosch (2015–2021)

== Automotive design work ==
Italdesign has been credited for the design of a wide variety of concept and production cars since the firm's founding in 1968.

=== Concept cars ===
Concept cars
Model	Year
Abarth 1600 GT	1969
Alfa Romeo Brera	2002
Alfa Romeo Caimano	1971
Alfa Romeo Iguana	1969
Alfa Romeo New York Taxi	1976
Alfa Romeo Scighera	1997
Alfa Romeo Visconti	2004
AMC AMX/3	1969
Aston Martin Twenty Twenty	2001
Audi-Karmann Asso di Picche	1973
Audi Q2	2017
Bizzarrini Manta	1968
BMW M1	1971
BMW Nazca C2	1991
BMW Nazca C2 Spider	1993
BMW Nazca M12	1991
BMW-Karmann Asso di Quadri	1976
Bugatti 18/3 Chiron	1999
Bugatti EB112	1993
Bugatti EB118	1998
Bugatti EB218	1999
Bugatti ID90	1990
Chevrolet Corvette Moray	2003
Daewoo Bucrane	1995
Daewoo d'Arts	1997
Daihatsu D-Compact X-Over	2006
DeLorean Alpha5	2022
Ferrari GG50	2005
Fiat Croma 8V	2005
Fiat Firepoint	1994
Fiat Panda 4x4 Strip	1980
Ford Maya	1984
Ford Maya II ES	1985
Ford Maya II EM	1985
Ford Mustang by Giugiaro	2006
Frazer Nash Namir	2009
Hyundai Pony Coupé	1974
Isuzu Asso di Fiori	1979
Italdesign Asgard	1988
Italdesign Aspid	1988
Italdesign Biga	1992
Italdesign Brivido	2012
Italdesign Capsula	1982
Italdesign Cinquecento	1992
Italdesign Columbus	1992
Italdesign Davinci	2019
Italdesign Formula	1996
Italdesign Clipper	2014
Italdesign Gea	2015
Italdesign Go	2011
Italdesign Parcour	2013
Italdesign Quaranta	2008
Italdesign Quintessenza	2025
Italdesign Vad.Ho	2007
Italdesign GTZERO	2016
Italdesign Lucciola	1993
Italdesign M8	1978
Italdesign Machimoto	1986
Italdesign Marlin	1984
Italdesign Parcour	2013
Italdesign Structura	1998
Italdesign Tex	2011
Italdesign Together	1984
Italdesign Touareg	2000
Italdesign Zerouno	2017
Jaguar Kensington	1990
Lamborghini Calà	1995
Lamborghini Marco Polo	1982
Lancia Medusa	1980
Lancia Megagamma	1978
Lancia Orca	1982
Lexus Landau	1994
Lotus Etna	1984
Maserati Boomerang	1972
Maserati Buran	2000
Maserati Coupé 2+2	1974
Maserati Kubang	2003
Maserati Medici	1974
Maserati Medici II	1976
Mitsubishi Nessie	2005
Nissan GT-R50	2018
Oldsmobile Incas	1986
Proton Emas	2010
Renault Gabbiano	1983
Saipa Tiba	2008
SEAT Proto C	1990
SEAT Proto T	1989
SEAT Proto TL	1990
Škoda 760	1973
SsangYong C200	2008
Suzuki Microutilitaria	1969
Toyota Alessandro Volta	2009
Volkswagen Karmann Cheetah	1971
Volkswagen Orbit	1986
Volkswagen Porsche Tapiro	1970
Volkswagen Tarek	2003
Volkswagen Tex	2011
Volkswagen W12 Roadster	1998
Volkswagen W12 Syncro	1997
Voyah i-Free	2020
Voyah i-Land	2020

=== Production cars ===
Production cars
Model	Year
Alfa Romeo 156 facelift	2003
Alfa Romeo 159	2005
Alfa Romeo Alfasud	1971
Alfa Romeo Alfasud Sprint	1976
Alfa Romeo Alfetta GT	1974
Alfa Romeo Brera	2005
Audi 80	1978
Besturn B50	2009
Besturn B70	2006
Brilliance BS2	2009
Brilliance BS6	2001
Citroën C3 Pluriel	2003
Daewoo Kalos/Chevrolet Aveo	2002
Daewoo Lacetti	2003
Daewoo Lanos hatchback	1997
Daewoo Lanos notchback	1996
Daewoo Leganza	1997
Daewoo Matiz	1998
Daihatsu Move	1998
DMC DeLorean	1981
Eagle Premier	1987
Fiat Croma	1985
Fiat Croma	2005
Fiat Duna/Prêmio	1985
Fiat Duna Weekend	1986
Fiat Grande Punto	2005
Fiat Idea	2003
Fiat Palio/Siena	2000
Fiat Palio Weekend	2000
Fiat Panda	1980
Fiat Punto	1993
Fiat Punto Cabrio	1993
Fiat Sedici/Suzuki SX4	2006
Fiat Uno	1983
Ford Capri (interior)	1989
Hongqi HS5	2019
Hyundai Excel	1985
Hyundai Pony	1974
Hyundai Sonata	1988
Hyundai Stellar	1983
Isuzu Gemini/Spectrum	1984
Isuzu Piazza/Impulse	1981
Italdesign Aztec	1988
Iveco Massif/Campagnola	2008
Lancia Delta	1979
Lancia Prisma	1982
Lancia Thema	1984
Lotus Esprit	1972
Maserati 3200 GT (exterior)	1998
Maserati Bora	1971
Maserati Coupé (exterior)	2002
Maserati MC12	2004
Maserati Merak	1972
Maserati Quattroporte	1976
Maserati Spyder (exterior)	2001
Proton Prevé	2012
Proton Suprima S	2013
Renault 19	1988
Renault 21	1986
Saab 9000	1984
SEAT Córdoba	1993
SEAT Ibiza	1984
SEAT Ibiza	1993
SEAT Málaga	1985
SEAT Toledo	1991
SEAT Toledo	1998
Ssangyong Korando	2010
SsangYong Rexton	2001
Subaru Alcyone SVX	1991
Suzuki SX4	2007
Suzuki Carry	1969
Toyota Aristo/Lexus GS	1991
Volkswagen Golf	1974
Volkswagen Passat	1973
Volkswagen Scirocco	1974
Zastava Florida	1987

Industrial vehicles
Model	Year
Lamborghini Champion	1998
Lamborghini Champion	2001
Lamborghini Formula	1991
Lamborghini Premium	1995
Lamborghini Runner	1995
Lamborghini Victory	1998

== Notable designers ==
- Giorgetto Giugiaro (1968–2015)
- Fabrizio Giugiaro
- Carlo Gaino (1980–1987)
- Filippo Perini (2015–)
- Dario Lauriola

== Sources ==
- Ciferri, Luca (2010-05-25). "Volkswagen says Italdesign purchase will boost its growth strategy". autoweek.com. Crain Communications, Inc. Archived from the original on 2011-06-28.
- "Info - Contacts". italdesign.it. Italdesign Giugiaro S.p.A. 2011. Archived from the original on 2011-07-07.
- "Italdesign History". www.conceptcarz.com. conceptcarz.com. 2011. Archived from the original on 2012-03-19.
- "Projects". italdesign.it. Italdesign Giugiaro S.p.A. 2011. Archived from the original on 2011-07-22.
- "Services". italdesign.it. Italdesign Giugiaro S.p.A. 2011. Archived from the original on 2011-07-07.
- "Statement of Interests Pursuant to Sections 285 and 313 of the German Commercial Code" (PDF). AUDI AG. 2012-02-17. Archived from the original (PDF) on 2019-09-21. "Italdesign Giugiaro S.p.A., Turin (Italy) 90.1%"
- "Volkswagen Group completes acquisition of majority shareholding in Italdesign Giugiaro" (Press release). VOLKSWAGEN AG. 2010-08-09. Archived from the original on 2011-07-17. "2010-05-25"
- "Volkswagen Group takes majority shareholding in Italdesign Giugiaro" (Press release). Italdesign Giugiaro S.p.A. 2010-05-25. Archived from the original on 2011-07-08.
- "Volkswagen Group takes majority shareholding in Italdesign Giugiaro" (Press release). VOLKSWAGEN AG. 2010-05-25. Archived from the original on 2011-07-17.
- "VW schließt Mehrheitserwerb an Giugiaro ab" [VW completes acquisition of majority of Giugiaro]. automobilwoche.de (in German). Crain Communications GmbH. 2010-08-09. Archived from the original on 2016-03-04.
