= Italdesign Machimoto =

1986 concept car

The Italdesign Machimoto was a concept car by styling house Italdesign shown at the 1986 Turin Motor Show.

== Background ==
The Italdesign Machimoto was a development of the Volkswagen Orbit concept from the same year, and both used the Volkswagen Golf Mk2 platform. It was a concept of a car for socialising, and a cross between a car and a motorcycle. The seats were two parallel rows of motorcycle seats that could accommodate 6 or 9 people depending upon the configuration. Each passenger had a seat belt. It used the 1.8L 16v engine from the Golf GTi. The design never went into production.
