= Volkswagen Orbit (1986) =

Overview
- Production: 1986
- Designer: Italdesign Giugiaro

Body and chassis
- Layout: Front-engine, four-wheel-drive

Powertrain
- Engine: 1,781 cc (108.7 cu in) I4 SOHC

Dimensions
- Length: 3,985 mm (156.9 in)

The Volkswagen Orbit is a concept car by styling house Italdesign shown at the 1986 Turin Motor Show. It shouldn't be confused with another Volkswagen Orbit concept shown in 1991.

== Overview ==
=== Background ===
The Orbit was a further refinement of previous Italdesign concepts such as the Alfa Romeo New York Taxi (1976), Lancia Megagamma (1978), Capsula (1982) and Together (1984). The concept was built on a Volkswagen Golf Mk2 platform, specifically the new Syncro. The goal was to produce a car around 4 metres in length. The concept was 15cm taller than the existing Volkswagen Golf and featured a large amount of glass.

The Orbit would be developed further into the Italdesign Machimoto, shown the same year.

=== Interior ===
Inside it featured a unique digital instrument cluster.
