= Italdesign Gea =

- The Gea at the Festival Automobile International 2016

Overview
- Manufacturer: Italdesign Giugiaro
- Production: 2015

Body and chassis
- Class: Full-size luxury concept car
- Body style: 4-door sedan
- Layout: 4WD
- Doors: Conventional doors (front); Coach doors (rear)

Powertrain
- Electric motor: Four 142 kW (190 hp) electric motors

Dimensions
- Curb weight: 2,000 kg (4,400 lb)

The Italdesign Gea is a full-size luxury concept car designed and produced by Italian auto design house Italdesign Giugiaro. It was introduced in 2015 at the Geneva Motor Show.

== Features ==
It has headlights that change with driving mode. In normal mode they are white, but when autonomous mode is selected, they turn blue. The vehicle explores autonomous driving-oriented interior layouts.

== Performance ==
The Gea is powered by four 142 kW (190 hp) electric motors producing a combined total of 570 kW (764 hp). Italdesign says it has a top speed of 250 km/h (155 mph).

== Gallery ==
The Gea at the Festival Automobile International 2016

Doors open, showing the interior

Front seats
