= Italdesign GTZERO =

Overview
- Manufacturer: Italdesign Giugiaro
- Production: 2016
- Designer: Italdesign Giugiaro

Body and chassis
- Class: Concept car
- Body style: 2-door wagon
- Doors: Butterfly

Powertrain
- Electric motor: 3 electric motors
- Electric range: 310 mi (499 km) (claimed)

Dimensions
- Curb weight: 4365 lbs (1979.9 kg) (claimed)

The Italdesign GTZERO is an electric shooting-brake concept produced by Italian design company Italdesign Giugiaro and showcased at the 2016 Geneva Motor Show.

== Performance ==
The GTZERO is powered by three electric motors, two in the front and one in the rear, and is all-wheel drive. The front electric motors produce 148 hp (110 kW) each and the rear motor produces 188 hp (140 kW) for a total of 483 hp (360 kW) and an electronically limited top speed of 155 mph (249 km/h). Italdesign says the car has a range of 310 mi (499 km) and can recharge to 80 percent capacity in 30 minutes.

== Features ==
The GTZERO is built on a modular carbon fiber monocoque, which Italdesign says houses the batteries and allows for multiple body styles to be used. The chassis also features aluminum front and rear subframes. a lightweight composite body, butterfly doors and four wheel steering with 5 degrees of steering angle. The interior features configurable seating which can be changed from a 2+2 to a 3+1 arrangement as well as multiple touchscreens to control interior functions.
