= Maserati Medici =

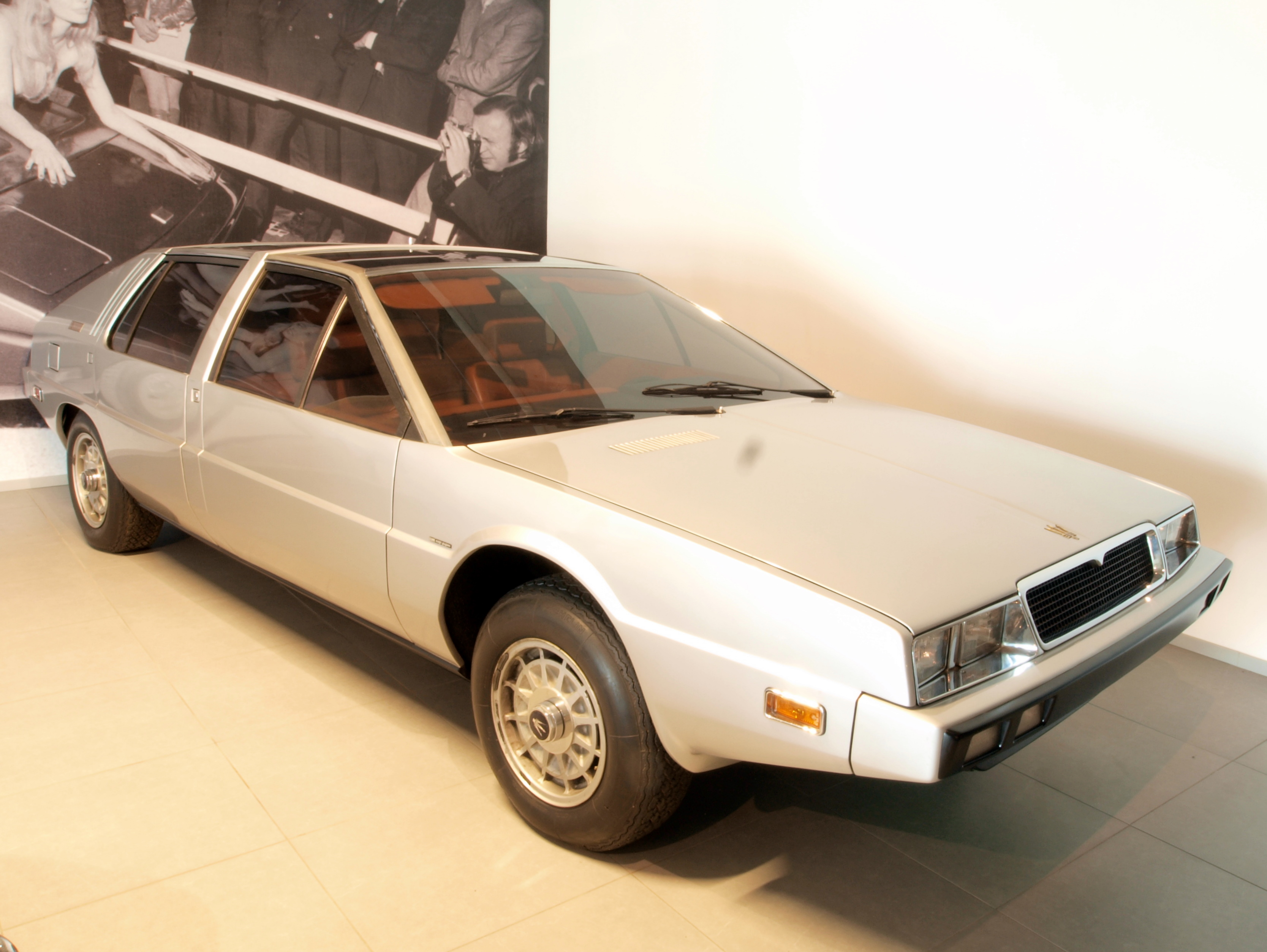
- Maserati Medici II

Overview
- Manufacturer: Maserati
- Production: 1974, 1976 (Concept car)
- Assembly: Italy
- Designer: Giorgetto Giugiaro at Italdesign

Body and chassis
- Body style: 4-door fastback saloon
- Layout: FR
- Platform: Maserati Indy

Powertrain
- Engine: 4.9 L DOHC V8
- Transmission: 5-speed + reverse Manual transmission

Dimensions
- Length: 5,220 mm (205.5 in)
- Width: 1,860 mm (73.2 in)
- Height: 1,370 mm (53.9 in)

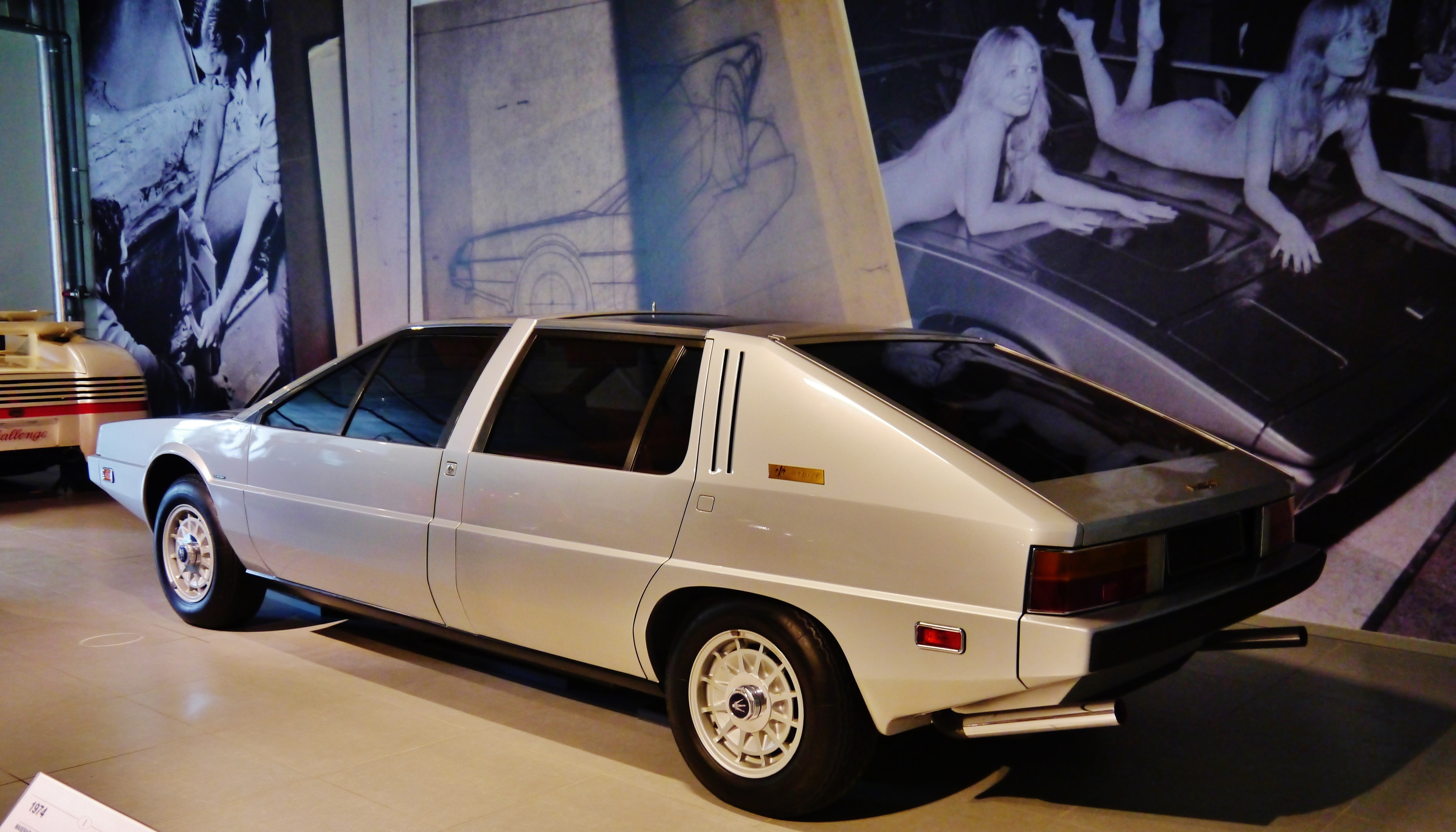
Maserati Medici II rear view

The Maserati Medici is a concept car developed by the Turin design firm Italdesign for Maserati. Two slightly different models, the Medici I and the Medici II were produced in 1974 and 1976. The design was led by Giorgetto Giugiaro. The Medici's design had an influence on numerous other production vehicles in the 1970s. The Medici was named after the Florentine family of the same name, renowned for their power and patronage of the arts during the Renaissance.

== Concept ==
The Maserati Medici was a design study for a luxury sports sedan. Both versions of the Medici were designed on the frame of the Maserati Indy as a four door fastback. Both versions had a longitudinally mounted 4.9 Liter V8, which was also borrowed from the Indy.

=== Medici I ===
The Medici I was built in 1974, and it shared many design elements with Giugiaro's previous Asso Di Picche concept. One influential feature of the Medici I was the trapezoidal C-pillar, which became wider as it ran down the side of the car. Giugiaro later used this design in many different cars, including the Lancia Delta I and the 1980 Audi Coupé. While the Medici's C-pillar was made of solid sheet metal, other vehicles such as the Audi 80 B2 and the Yugo Florida had an additional trapezoidal window in the C-pillar.

The front end of the Medici I was very similar to Giugiaro's 1974 Maserati Coupé 2+2 (also known as Tipo 124), which was the potential successor to the Indy. Alike the Medici, the Coupé 2+2's front fascia ended in a point and had pop-up headlights.

Inside, the Medici I was designed to have six seats. Behind the two front seats were two benches installed opposite each other; the passengers in the middle row sat opposite to the direction of travel. The space in the rear cabin was crowded, leading to changes for the Medici II.

The Medici I was first publicly displayed in October 1974 at the Turin Auto Show.

=== Medici II ===
In 1976, Giugiaro presented Medici II. Unlike the Medici I, it was a four-seater. The interior was fully redesigned, and the benches were replaced by two chairs. The rear also included a bar, refrigerator, desk, and file holder, as well as a television and a radiophone which were futuristic for the time. The main difference in the styling of the Medici II was in the front fascia. Instead of the semi-pointed front of the Medici I, the Medici II carried a higher front end, allowing for four high-set square headlights and a square, chrome-framed grille.

The Medici II is considered the stylistic predecessor of the Maserati Quattroporte III, which was produced starting in 1979.

The Medici II was exhibited at the 1976 Paris Motor Show and sold in 1977 to Mohammad Reza Pahlavi, the Shah of Persia, who had a fondness for Maserati models. The car now resides in the Louwman Collection.
