= SEAT Proto =

- 1990 SEAT Proto C (December 2008)

Overview
- Manufacturer: SEAT, SA
- Production: 1990
- Designer: Giorgetto Giugiaro at Italdesign

Body and chassis
- Class: Concept car
- Body style: 3-door hatchback

The SEAT Proto T (1989), the SEAT Proto C (1990) and the SEAT Proto TL (1990) are all concept cars designed for SEAT by Giorgetto Giugiaro’s Italdesign.

By that time, Italdesign had a large-scale cooperation with SEAT, which dated back to the 1980s. This led to the foundation in 1992 of Italdesign’s subsidiary of Spain, Diseño Industrial Italdesign Srl (known today as Italdesign Giugiaro Barcelona SL) in the hometown of SEAT, which is Barcelona.

== SEAT Proto T (1989) ==
The SEAT Proto T was presented at the 1989 Frankfurt Motor Show.

== SEAT Proto TL (1990) ==
The SEAT Proto TL was presented at the 1990 Geneva Motor Show.

Brakes and tyres

- Driveline: front-wheel drive

Exterior, dimensions and weight

- length × width × height mm: 4375 x 1715 x 1435

== SEAT Proto C (1990) ==
The SEAT Proto C was presented at the 1990 Paris Motor Show as the preview of the 1993 SEAT Ibiza Mark II, which was also under development at the time by Italdesign. The designation of C in its name was referencing its likely positioning in the C Segment, with one mix of the spacious monovolume body size and the hatchback configuration.

The predominant characteristic was its rounded shape compared to the 1984 SEAT Ibiza Mark I, which was also styled by Italdesign, and the large glass surfaces that extended to the roof and the side windows. This three-door prototype had the drag coefficient of 0.25 and was based on a Volkswagen Group platform.

Brakes and tyres

- Driveline: front-wheel drive

Exterior, dimensions and weight

- length × width × height mm: 3910 x 1670 x 1120
