= Hongqi HS5 =

Compact luxury crossover SUV

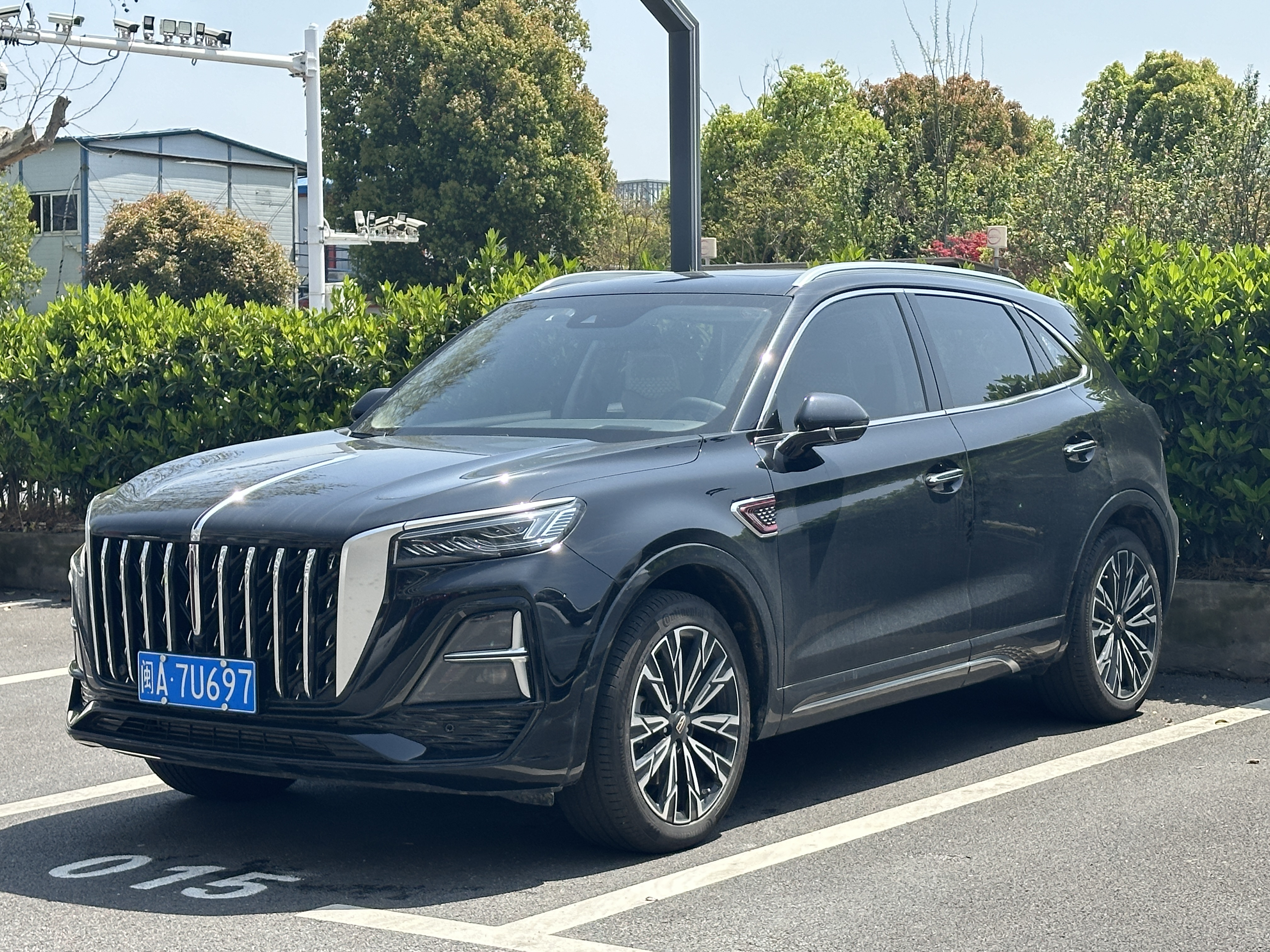
- Hongqi HS5 (facelift)

Overview
- Manufacturer: Hongqi (FAW Group)
- Production: 2019–present
- Model years: 2019–present
- Assembly: China: Changchun, Jilin
- Designer: Italdesign

Body and chassis
- Class: Compact luxury crossover SUV
- Body style: 5-door SUV
- Layout: Front-engine, all-wheel-drive; Front-engine, front-wheel drive

Powertrain
- Engine: 2.0 L CA4GC20TD-32 I4 (turbo petrol)
- Transmission: Aisin 6-speed Automatic transmission

Dimensions
- Wheelbase: 2,870 mm (113.0 in)
- Length: 4,760 mm (187.4 in)
- Width: 1,907 mm (75.1 in)
- Height: 1,700 mm (66.9 in)
- Kerb weight: 1,755–1,805 kg (3,869–3,979 lb)

The Hongqi HS5 is a compact luxury crossover SUV produced by Chinese automobile manufacturer Hongqi, a subsidiary of FAW Group from 2019.

== Overview ==
The Hongqi HS5 was originally previewed as the Hongqi U-Concept that was unveiled during the 2017 Shanghai Auto Show. It was designed by Italdesign.

The production version of the Hongqi HS5 is positioned as a luxury C-class SUV in the Chinese market. The price range is from 183,800 yuan to 249,800 yuan (US$27,506 – US$37,383).

The Hongqi HS5 is powered by a 2.0 liter turbocharged engine with a maximum power output of 165kW (221HP), mated to a 6-speed automatic transmission. The Hongqi HS5 will also meet the China-IV (CN-6B) emission standard.

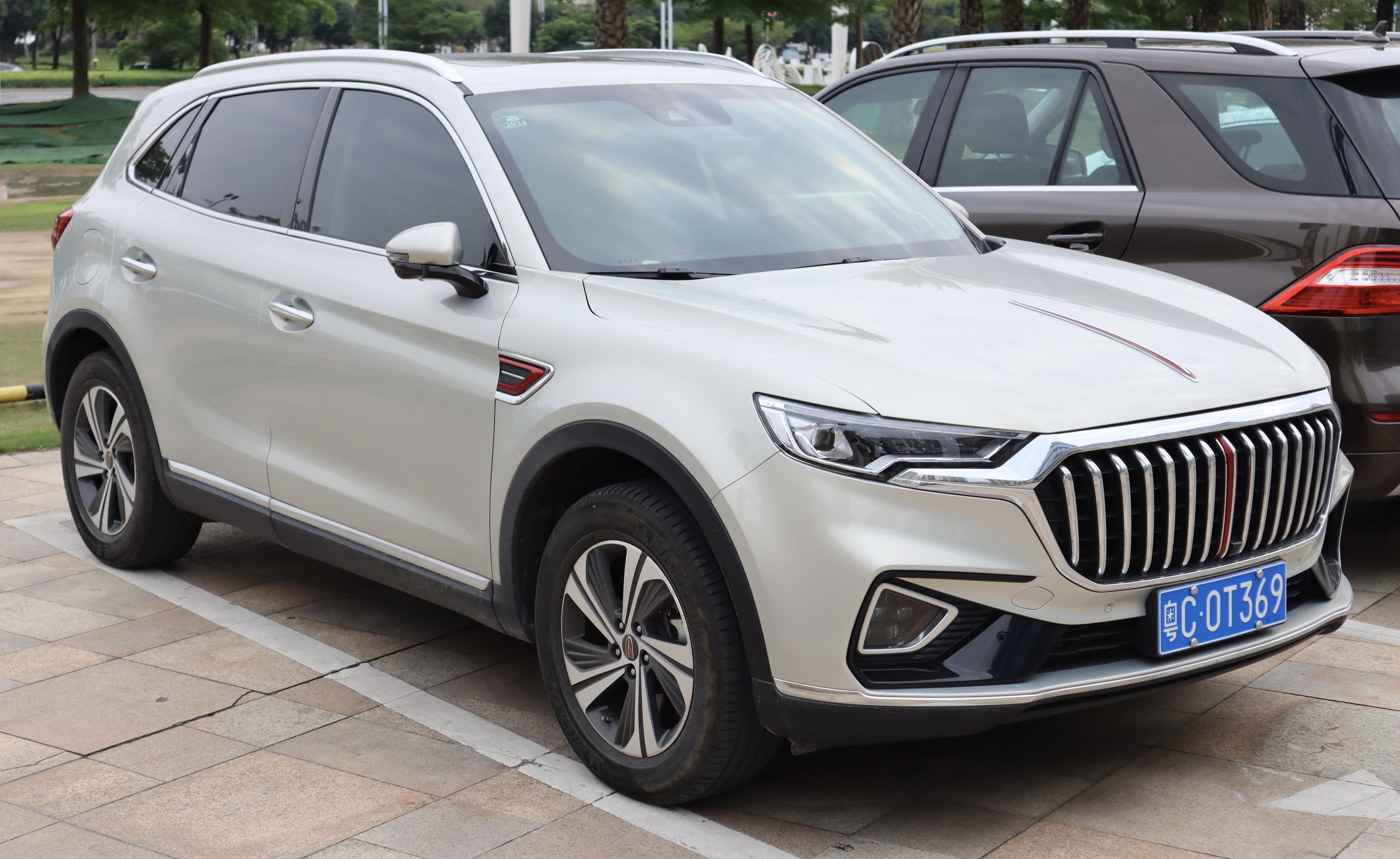
Hongqi HS5 (pre-facelift)

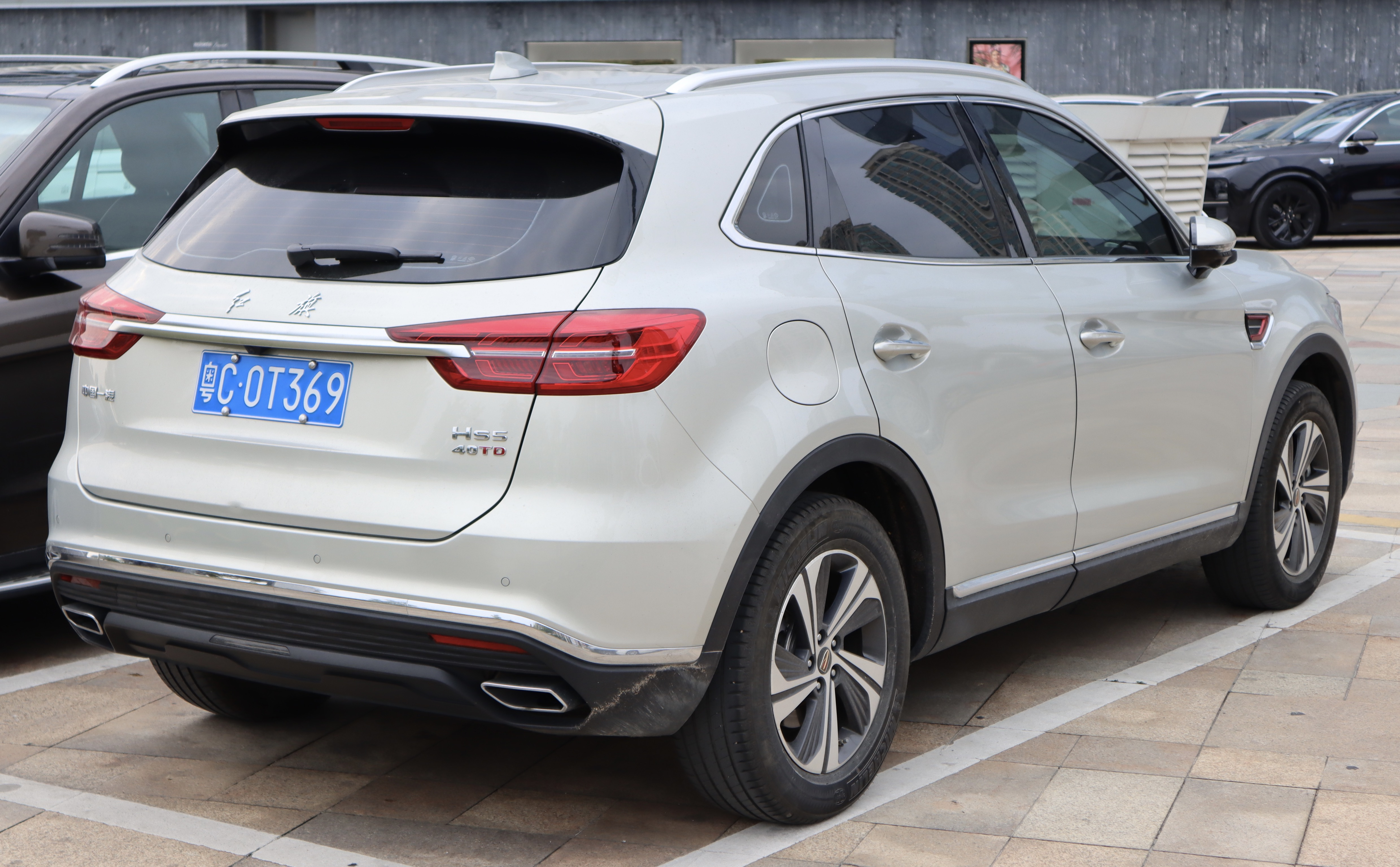
Rear view

== 2023 facelift ==
The Hongqi HS5 received a facelift for the 2023 model year and was unveiled during 2023 Auto Shanghai. The updated HS5 features restyled front and rear end designs, while the powertrain is a 2.0 liter turbocharged engine with a maximum power output of 185kW, which is 20kW more than the pre-facelift version. The engine is mated to a 8-speed automatic transmission.

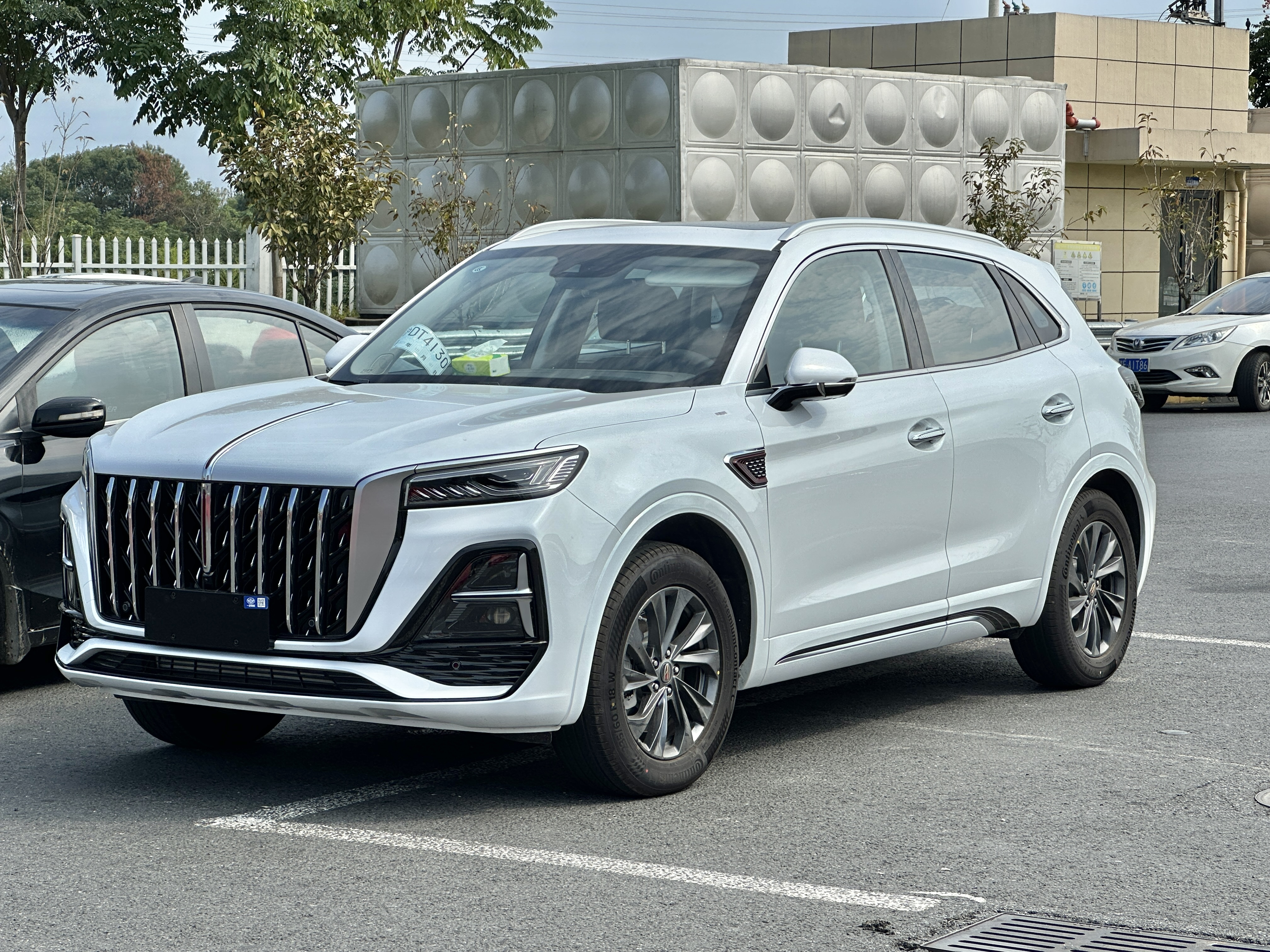
2023 facelift

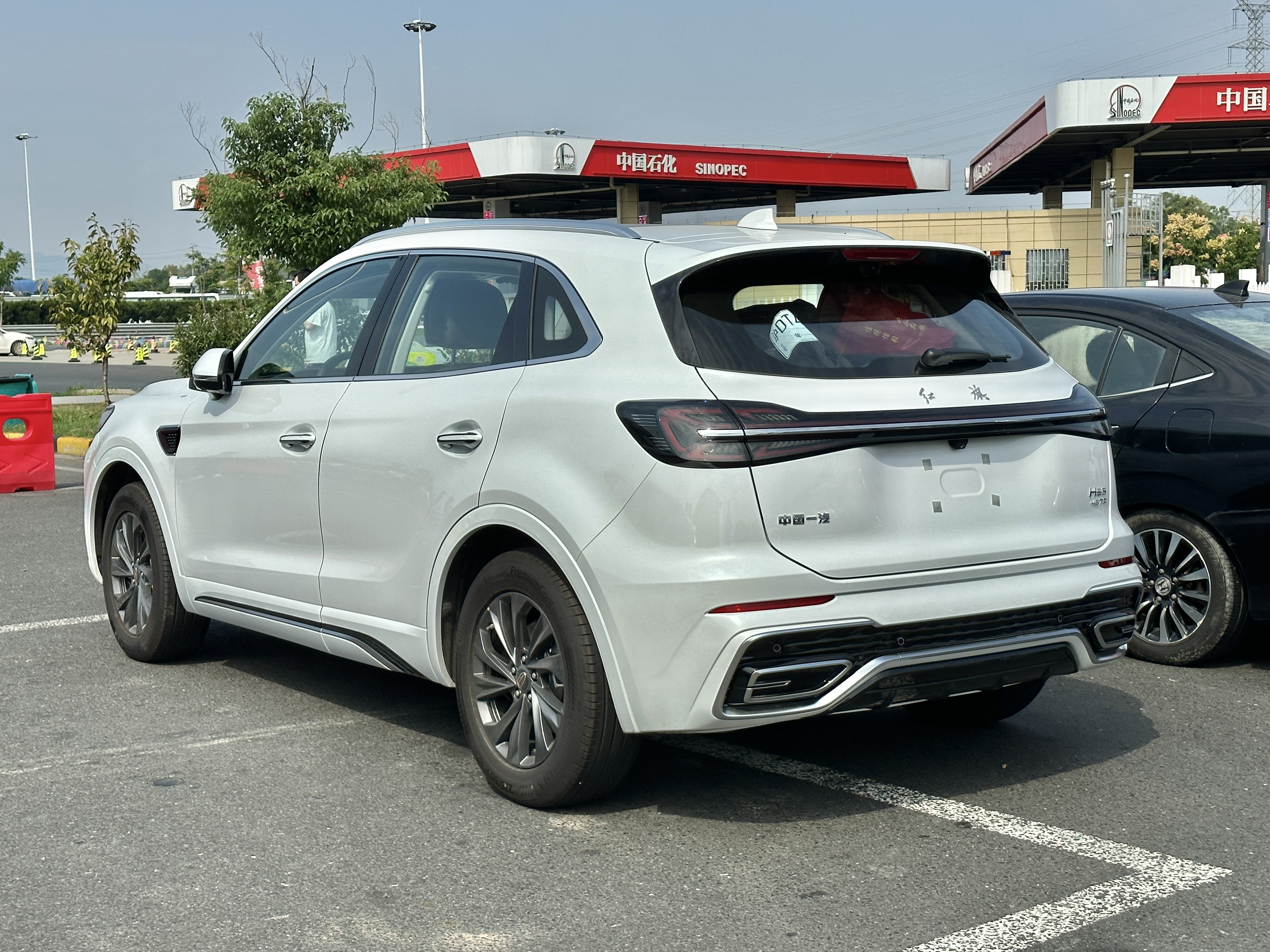
Rear view

== Sales ==
Year	China
2023	98,768
2024	90,293
2025	75,786
