= Lotus Etna =

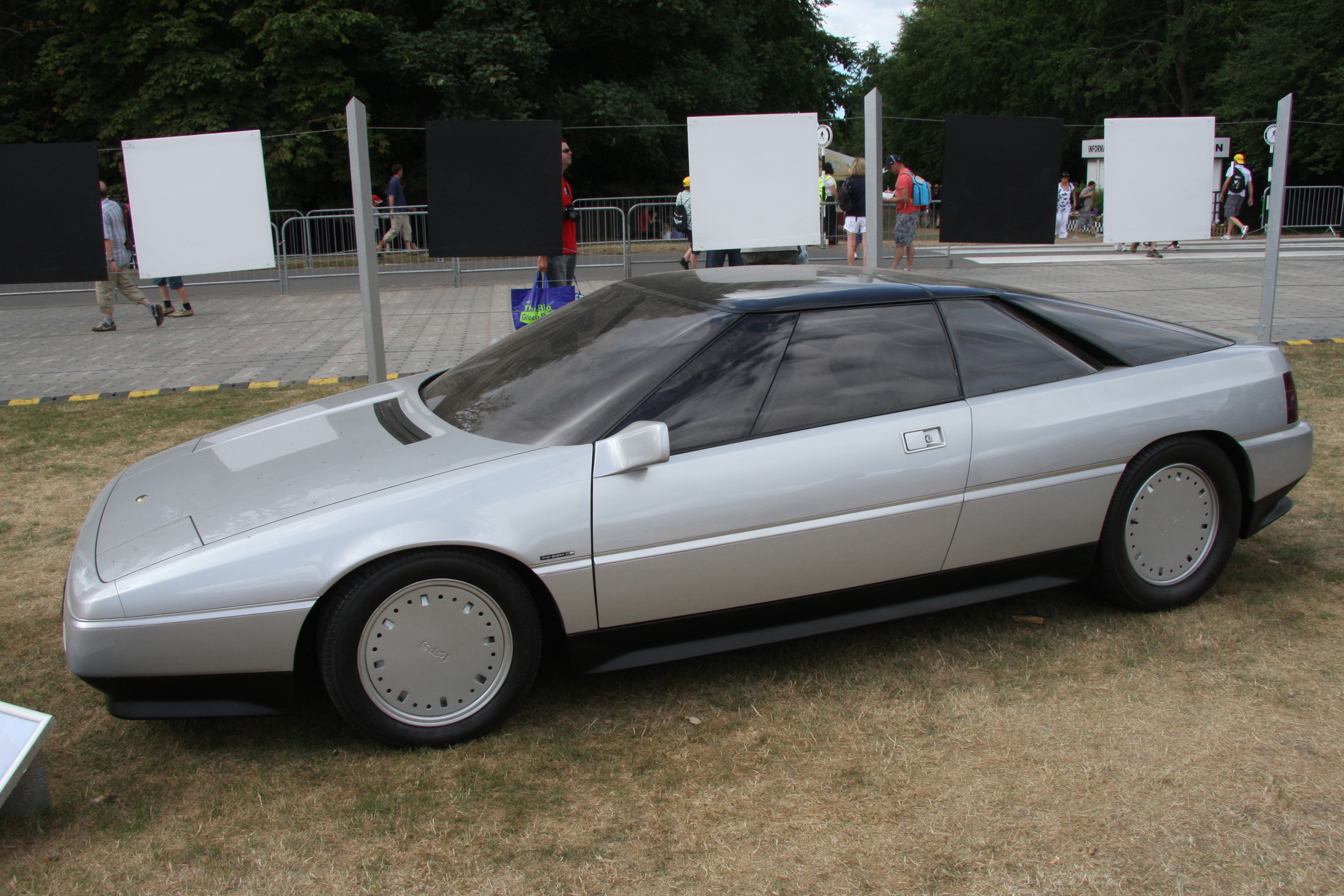

Overview
- Manufacturer: Lotus
- Production: 1984 (concept)
- Model years: 1984
- Designer: Giorgetto Giugiaro at Italdesign

Body and chassis
- Class: Concept supercar
- Body style: 2-door coupe
- Layout: Rear mid-engine, rear-wheel-drive

Powertrain
- Engine: 4.0 liter Lotus 909 V8
- Transmission: 5-speed manual

Dimensions
- Wheelbase: 99 in (2,515 mm)
- Length: 168 in (4,267 mm)
- Width: 72.6 in (1,844 mm)
- Height: 45 in (1,143 mm)
- Kerb weight: 2,606 lb (1,182 kg)

The Lotus Etna is a one-off concept car designed by Giorgetto Giugiaro, who also designed the Lotus Esprit. It premiered at the 1984 British International Motor Show. It is powered by a 4.0-litre V8 of Lotus design, code-named the Type 909. Engineer Tony Rudd had been asked in 1978 by Colin Chapman to build a new V8 engine that should have as much in common with the slant-four still operational across the Lotus family as possible, while conjuring at least 320bhp and 300lb ft.

Meanwhile, other Lotus engineers were working on a new active suspension system for the firm's F1 Grand Prix machines that would eventually filter down into the road cars. Lotus sent the Esprit chassis to Italdesign, with the new engine and gearbox in order to help Giorgetto Giugiaro with the packaging of his creation.

When the Etna was revealed in Birmingham, it was promised that it would be the first road-going Lotus to receive this sophisticated suspension, along with traction control, ABS and noise cancelling – and, of course, Rudd's 4.0-litre Type 909 engine which ultimately produced 335bhp and 295lb ft. Only two Type 909s engines were built; the other had been retained by Lotus for display purposes.

General Motors bought Lotus in 1986 and the Etna and Type 909 were put on ice and eventually killed, as the company changed tack completely, working towards an inexpensive sports car that would eventually emerge in 1989 as the front-wheel-drive Elan. The spirit of the Etna lived on in Peter Stevens’ Esprit remix of 1987, but the emergence of a new Lotus V8 engine would have to wait until 1996 – and that was completely unrelated to the Type 909.
