= Italdesign Zerouno =

Limited production sports car manufactured by Italdesign Giugiaro

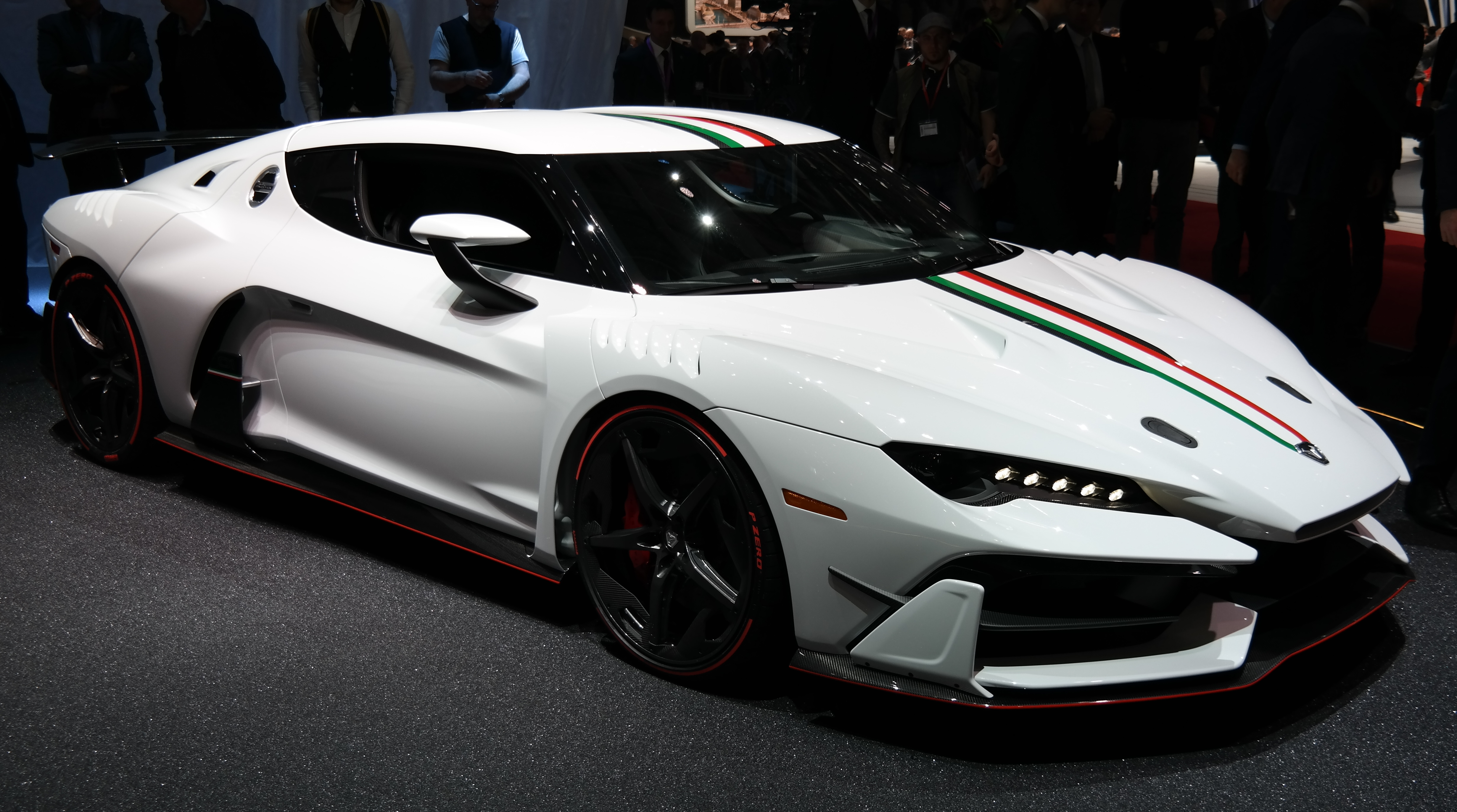
- Zerouno coupe

Overview
- Manufacturer: Italdesign Giugiaro
- Production: 2017
- Designer: Filippo Perini of Italdesign

Body and chassis
- Class: Sports car (S)
- Body style: 2-door coupe (Zerouno); 2-door roadster (Zerouno Duerta)
- Layout: Mid-engine, four-wheel-drive
- Platform: Volkswagen Group Modular Sports System Platform
- Related: Lamborghini Huracán; Audi R8 (Type 4S)

Powertrain
- Engine: 5.2 L FSI V10 (Lamborghini V10)
- Transmission: 7-speed dual clutch

Dimensions
- Wheelbase: 2,650 mm (104.3 in)
- Length: 4,847 mm (190.8 in)
- Width: 1,970 mm (77.6 in)
- Height: 1,240 mm (48.8 in)

The Italdesign Zerouno is a sports car produced by Italian automotive styling house Italdesign Giugiaro and introduced in 2017. The name means "Zero One", as it was the first production vehicle from Italdesign's low production sports car division, Italdesign Automobili Speciali.

== Production ==
The Zerouno coupé was introduced in 2017 at the Geneva Motor Show and had a limited production run of 5 units, all of which, according to the company, were sold. The coupé had a base price of US$1.69 million. The Zerouno Duerta (roadster) was introduced at the 2018 Geneva Motor Show and was also limited to 5 cars, which were also all reportedly sold.

== Specifications and performance ==
The Zerouno is powered by the same mid-mounted 5.2 liter naturally aspirated V10 engine used in the Audi R8 and Lamborghini Huracán. It produces 602 hp (449 kW; 610 PS) at 8,250 rpm and 520 Nm (383.5 lb-ft) of torque at 6,500 rpm, with power going to all four wheels through a seven-speed dual-clutch transmission. The car uses a modular carbon fiber and aluminum chassis and has bodywork made of carbon fiber. It has a top speed of 205 mph (330 km/h) and can accelerate from 0-60 mph (97 km/h) in 3.2 seconds.

== Gallery ==
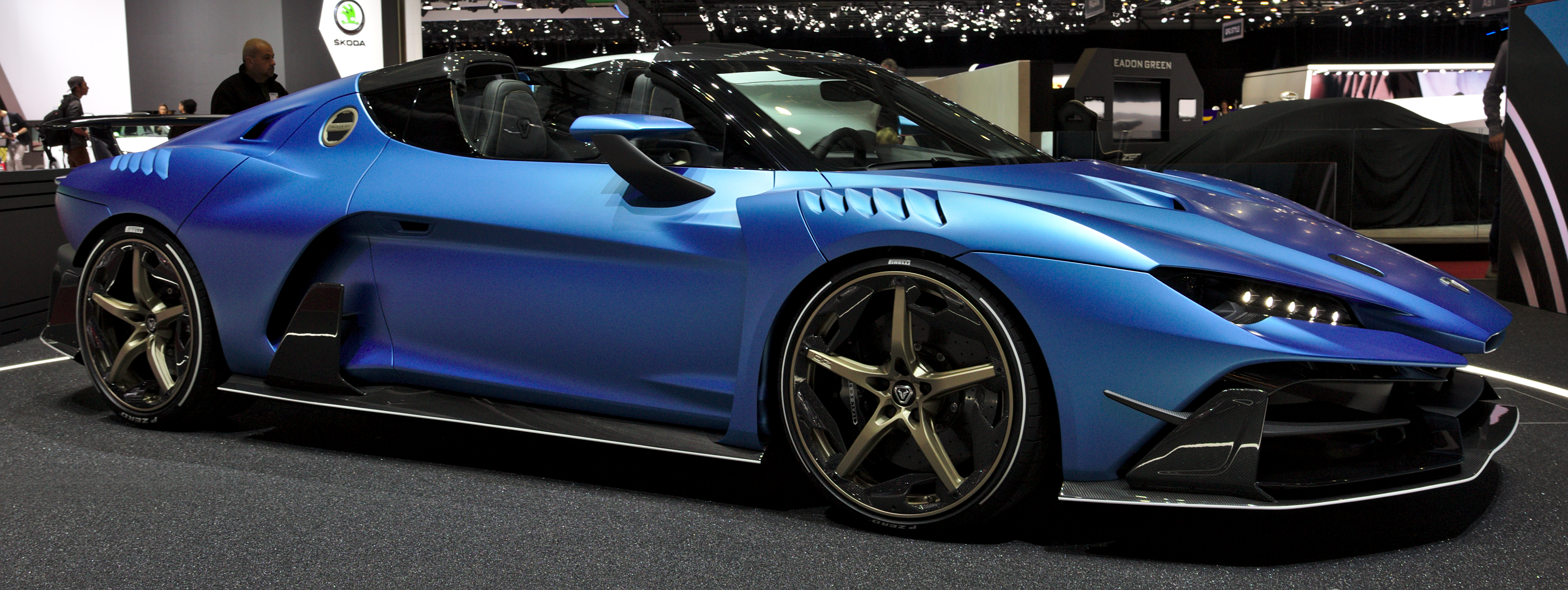
Zerouno Duerta

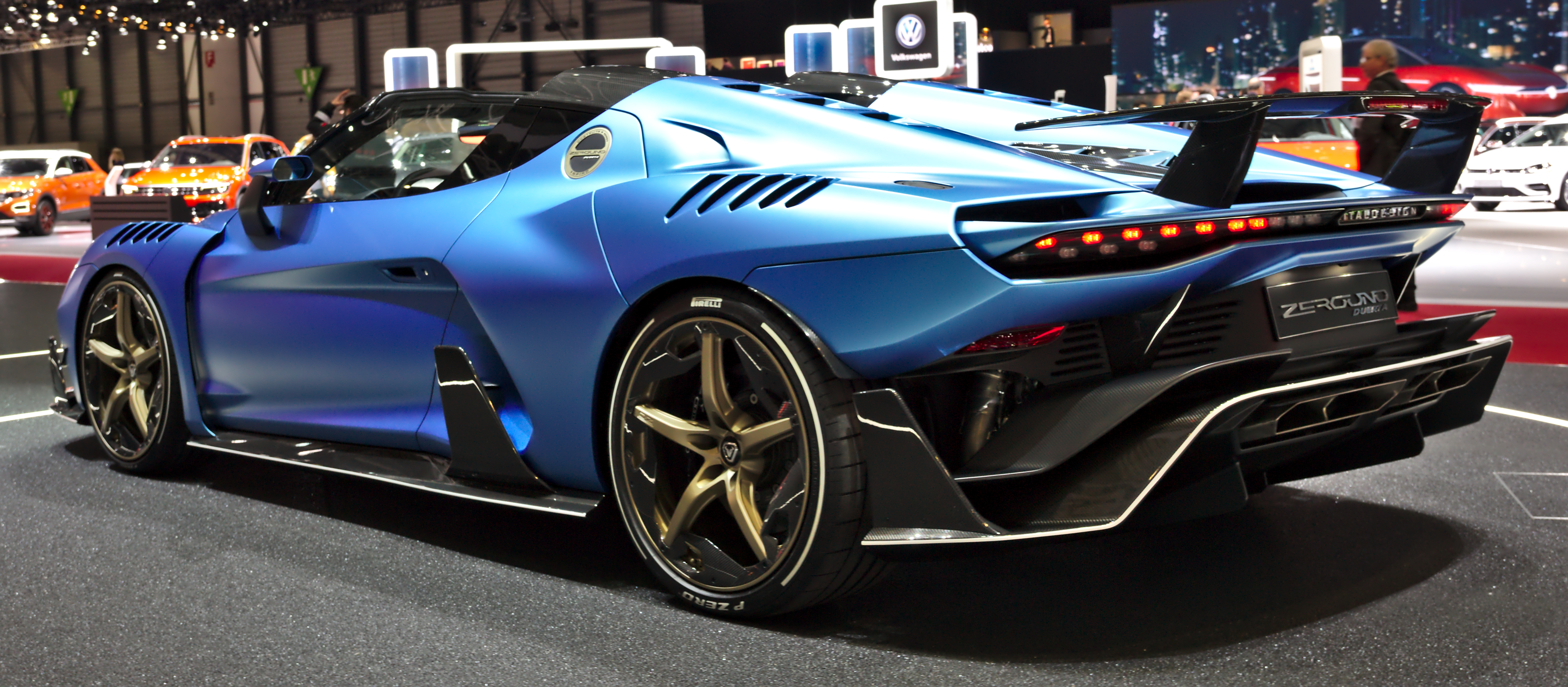
Zerouno Duerta (rear view)

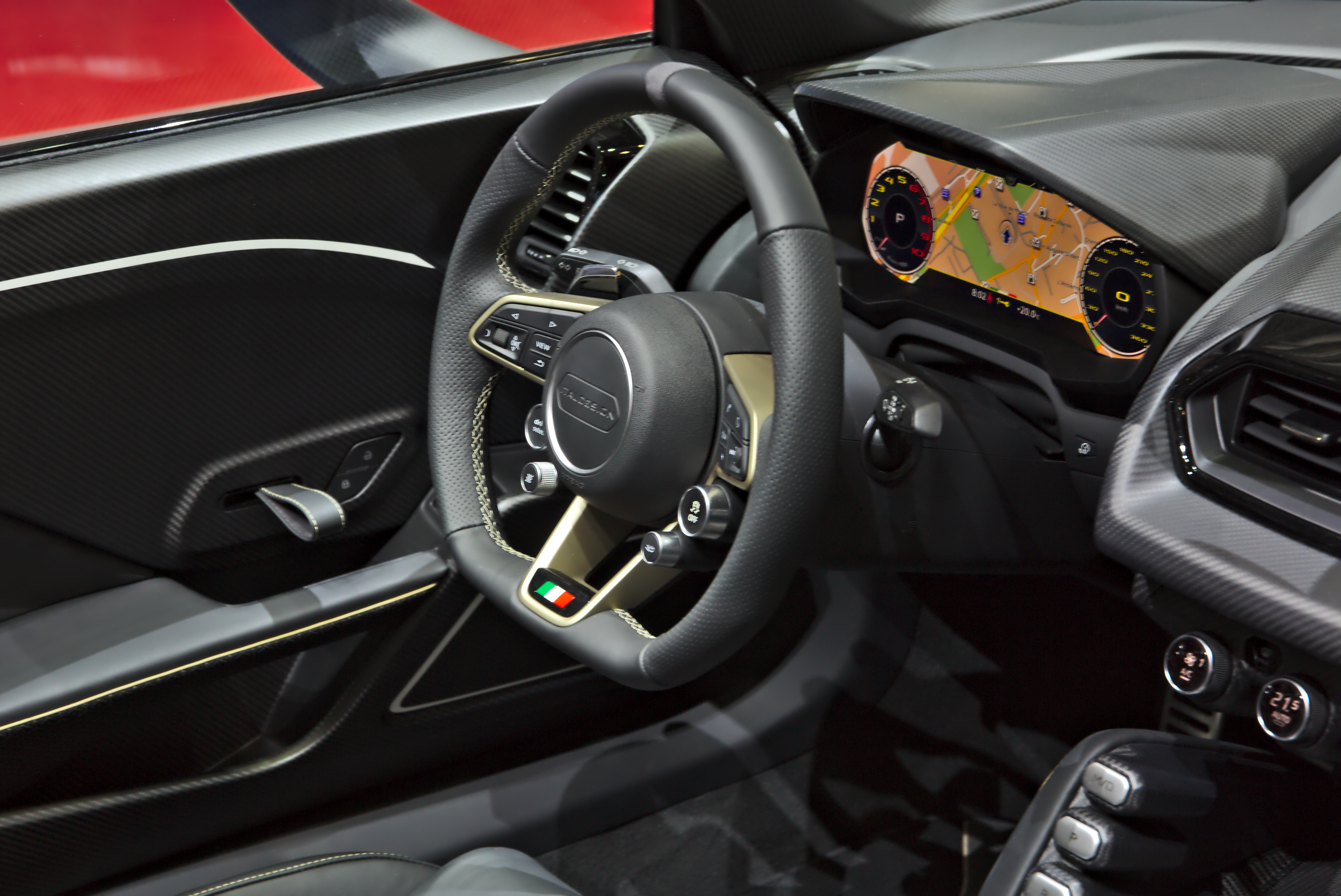
Interior
