= BMW Nazca C2 =

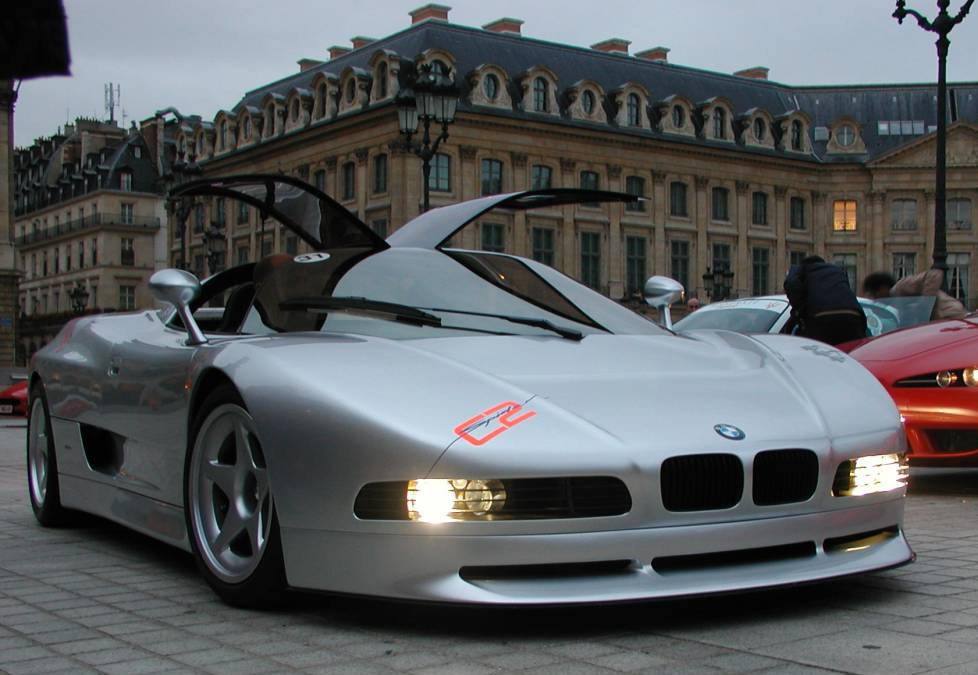
- BMW Nazca C2 Spider with the glass gullwing windows open

Overview
- Manufacturer: Italdesign Giugiaro under license from BMW
- Also called: Italdesign NAZCA C2
- Production: 1991–1993
- Assembly: Turin, Italy
- Designer: Giorgetto Giugiaro at Italdesign

Body and chassis
- Class: Concept car
- Body style: 2-door coupé 2-door targa top
- Layout: Mid-engine, rear-wheel drive
- Related: BMW 8 Series (E31)

Powertrain
- Engine: 5.0 L M70B50 V12 (Nazca M12 and C2); 5.6 L S70B56 V12 (Nazca C2 Spider)
- Transmission: 5-speed manual 6-speed manual (Nazca C2 Spider)

Dimensions
- Wheelbase: 2,600 mm (102.4 in)
- Length: 4,395 mm (173.0 in)
- Width: 2,085 mm (82.1 in)
- Height: 1,105 mm (43.5 in)
- Curb weight: 1,041 kg (2,295 lb)

Chronology
- Predecessor: BMW M1 (spiritual)

The BMW Nazca C2 (also known as Italdesign Nazca C2) is a concept sports car introduced at the 1991 Tokyo Motor Show. The car was designed by famed automotive design studio Italdesign, home of Giorgetto Giugiaro, and features a similar frontal design of a BMW. It was an evolution of the BMW Nazca M12 from 1991.

== History ==
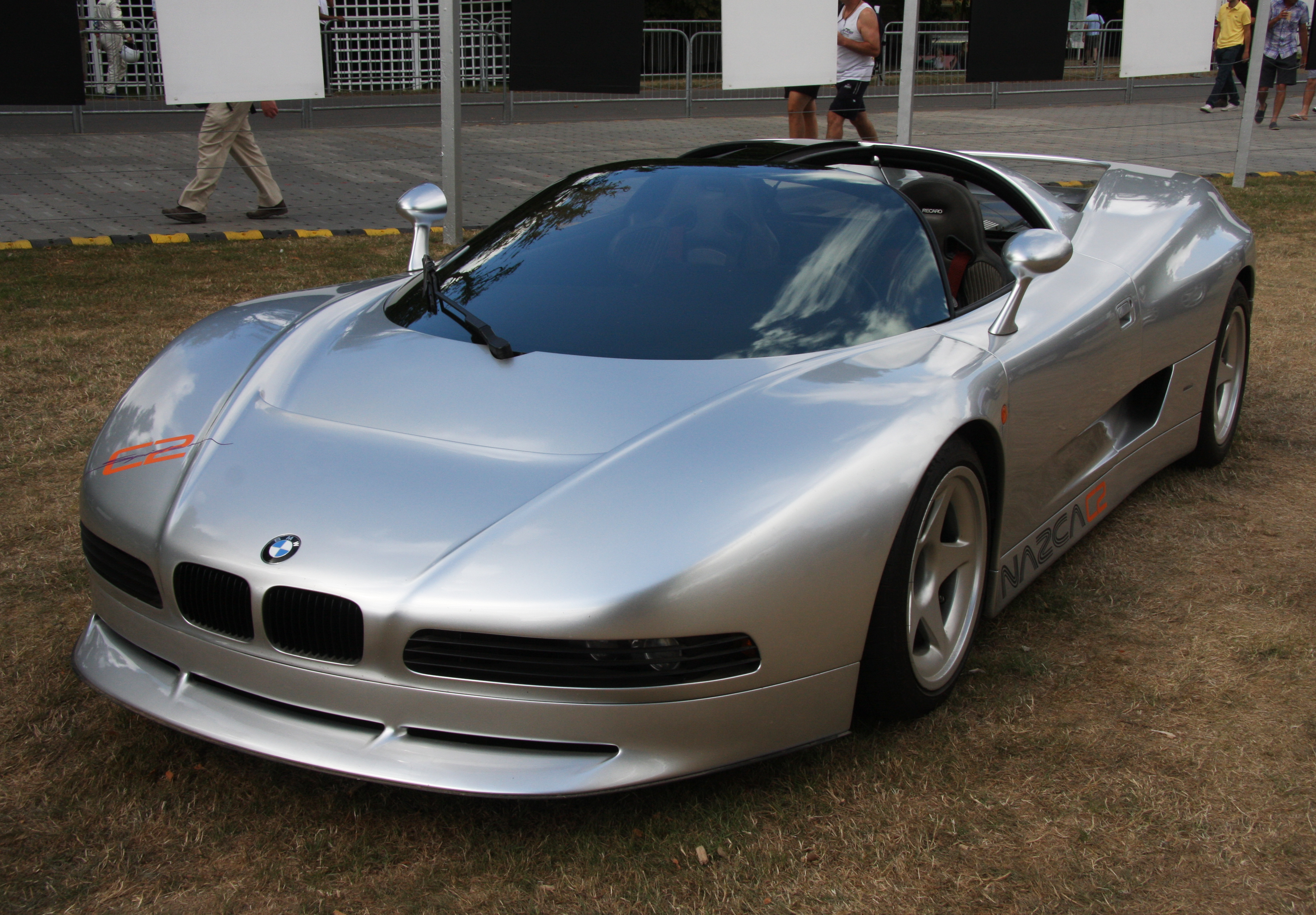
BMW Nazca C2 Spider with the glass panels removed

The Nazca project began in 1991 when the Nazca M12 was launched at the Tokyo Motor Show. The design was derived from the Bugatti ID 90 concept unveiled a year prior. The M12 was the first car designed by Giugiaro's son, Fabrizio and incorporated design elements from Group C race cars. The car achieved a drag coefficient of Cd=0.26 when tested in the BMW windtunnel.

The car had a carbon fibre body construction also using the material for the construction of the space frame. Due to this, the car weighed a total of 1,100 kg (2,425 lb).

The engine cover and front of the car were made from a single piece of molded carbon fibre. The car had a glass engine cover which displayed the 5.0 litre V12 engine shared with the BMW 850i. The engine generated a power output of 295 hp (220 kW; 299 PS). The car had a unique door mechanism which had conventional doors, alongside windows which opened in a gull-wing arrangement.

A year later in 1992, the Nazca C2 was introduced. The C2 had a redesigned front (the headlamps were relocated beside of the kidney grille) and a modified engine. Italdesign had engaged the German automobile manufacturer Alpina into the project. Alpina modified the engine and as a result, the engine gained an additional 49 hp (50 PS; 37 kW). This engine was shared with the Alpina B12 5.0. Additionally, the C2 also had fixed racing seats and three spoilers at the rear to signify its race inspired status. The C2 also weighed a claimed 100 kg (220 lb) less than the preceding M12.

== Specifications ==
The engine used was a modified version of the 5.0 litre V12 used in the BMW 8 Series tuned by Alpina. The engine originally generated a maximum power output of 345 hp (257 kW; 350 PS). The car had a top speed of 311 km/h (193 mph).

== Production ==
Five cars in total were produced by Italdesign, however only three of them (including the single M12) had BMW branding. The car was intended as an official replacement for the BMW M1, but BMW was hesitant to produce another mid-engined sports car after the M1 had been a failure, so they did not proceed. BMW allowed Italdesign to use their name and grille solely on the three concept cars built. The other two were commissioned by the Sultan of Brunei. These did not have any BMW logos, and had Alpina tuned V12s that made slightly more horsepower. One was painted in Estoril Blue, and was sold off for $1.1 million, and the other, Black on Black, is currently still in Brunei.

== Nazca C2 Spider ==
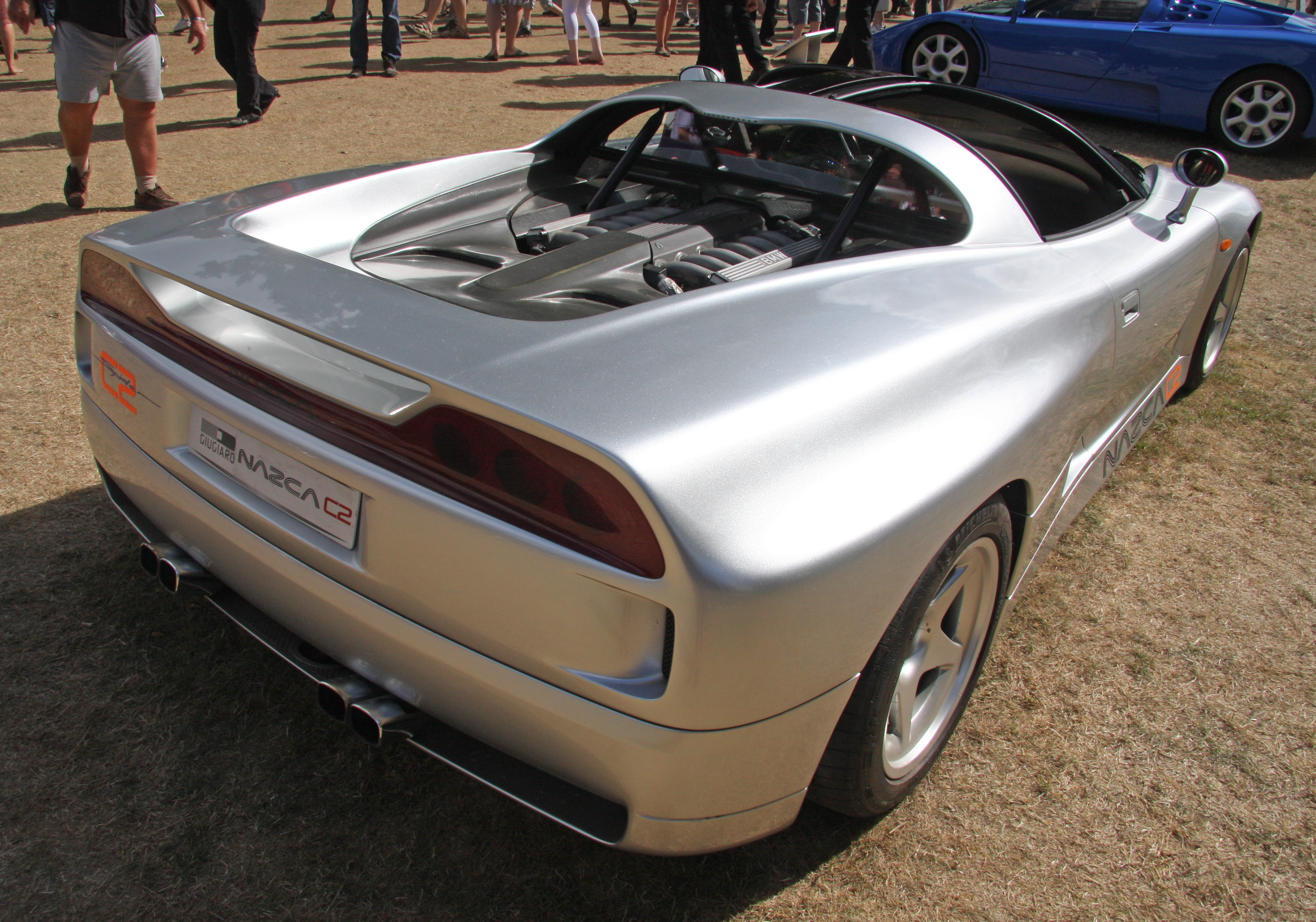
1993 BMW Nazca C2 Spider rear view

At the 1993 Formula One Grand Prix held in Monte Carlo, Italdesign introduced a new, slightly redesigned version of the C2 called C2 Spider. The car had removable glass panels instead of the semi-gullwing doors featured on the coupe, turning it into a roadster along with a modified engine cover. The removable parts were housed in the luggage compartment in the front of the car and could be quickly reinstalled. A roll bar in the colour of the car was fitted in order to reinforce the chassis to compensate for the loss of removable glass panels. The intake manifold of the engine was redesigned in order to allow for open air operation. The car was fitted with a 5.6-litres V12 engine shared with the 850CSi. The engine generated a maximum power output of 375 hp (280 kW; 380 PS), a 6-speed gearbox was installed instead of the 5-speed gearbox of the coupe to better cope with the increase in power.

== Pop-culture ==
The Italdesign Nazca C2 featured in the PC videogame Need For Speed II: Special Edition, and the Spider appears in the PlayStation version of Need For Speed III: Hot Pursuit. The Italian director Carlo Vanzina chose the Nazca C2 for a scene in his 1996 film, A spasso nel tempo, together with the Aztec and the Machimoto.
