= Turin Auto Show =

Italian Auto Show

Turin Auto Show Salone dell'Automobile di Torino Salone Auto Torino
- Status: Active
- Genre: Auto show
- Frequency: Annual
- Country: Italy
- Years active: 1900–2000; 2015–2019; 2024–
- Inaugurated: 21 April 1900; 126 years ago
- Previous event: 26 September 2025 – 28 September 2025
- Next event: 11 September 2026 – 13 September 2026
- Attendance: 350.000 (2015); 650.000 (2016); 700.000 (2017)
- Website: http://www.parcovalentino.com/salone-auto-torino http://www.saloneautotorino.com/

The Turin Motor Show (Italian: Salone dell'Automobile di Torino) is an auto show held annually in Turin, Italy. The first official show took place between 21 and 24 April 1900, at the Castle of Valentino, becoming a permanent fixture in Turin from 1938 having shared it with Milan and Rome until that time. From 1972, the show was held biannually and in 1984, it moved into Fiat's shuttered Lingotto factory.

In 2000, it was announced that the show was to be moved to April, starting in 2002. However, the event was last held in Turin in June 2000, and cancelled from 2002, resulting in the Bologna Motor Show taking over the role of Italy's International Motor Show. From 2015 to 2019, Turin again held a Motor Show, albeit as an open air festival to keep exhibitors' costs down, and provide free access to the public. It is held in the precinct of the Parco del Valentino. It has been held again since 2022 as part of Autolook Week, but the nature of the show has changed and it now has more of a focus on classics and specialty cars.

== Major vehicle introductions ==
=== 1900s ===
- 1902 — Adami Rondini
- 1904 — Motoruota Garavaglia
- 1906 — Aquila Italiana Cappa
- 1907 — SPA 28/40HP
- 1908 — Lancia Alfa-12HP

=== 1910s ===
==== 1913 ====
- Fiat Zero

==== 1919 ====
- Isotta Fraschini Tipo 8
- Fiat 501 (civilian version)

=== 1920s ===
==== 1923 ====
- OM 665 "Superba"
- Fiat 519
- Itala 56
- Chiribiri Monza

==== 1925 ====
- Lancia Lambda
- Itala 61
- Alfa Romeo 6C
- Fiat 509

=== 1940s ===
==== 1947 ====
- Grand Prix racing car prototype designed by Porsche

==== 1948 ====
- Ferrari 166 MM
- Lancia Ardea
- Maserati A6 cabriolet
- Fiat 500 Giardinetta Belvedere

==== 1949 ====
- Porsche-Cisitalia racing cars

=== 1950s ===
==== 1950 ====
- Lancia Aurelia
- Alfa Romeo 1900
- Fiat 1400

==== 1951 ====
- Panhard Dyna X86 Berlinetta

==== 1952 ====
- Abarth 1500 Biposto Coupé
- Siata 208 CS

==== 1953 ====
1953

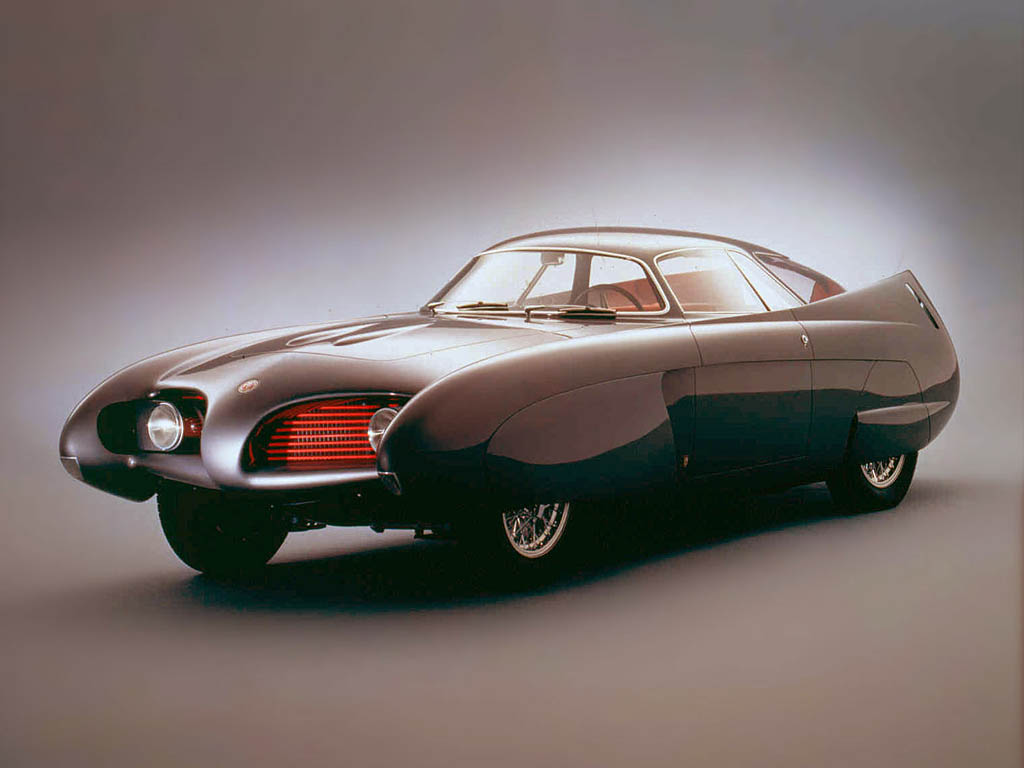
Alfa Romeo B.A.T. 5

- Alfa Romeo BAT 5 concept
- Lancia Appia

==== 1954 ====
1954

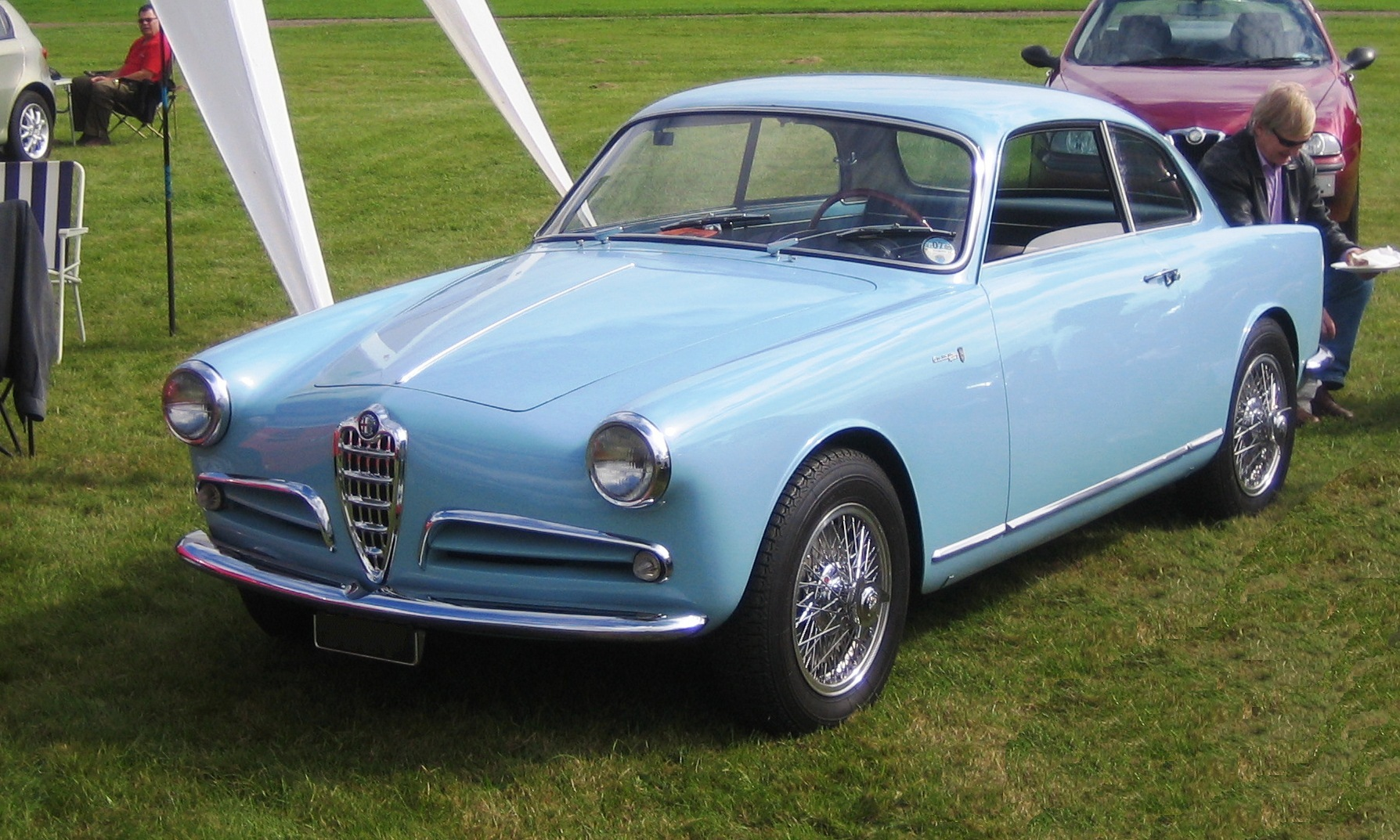
Alfa Romeo Giulietta Sprint

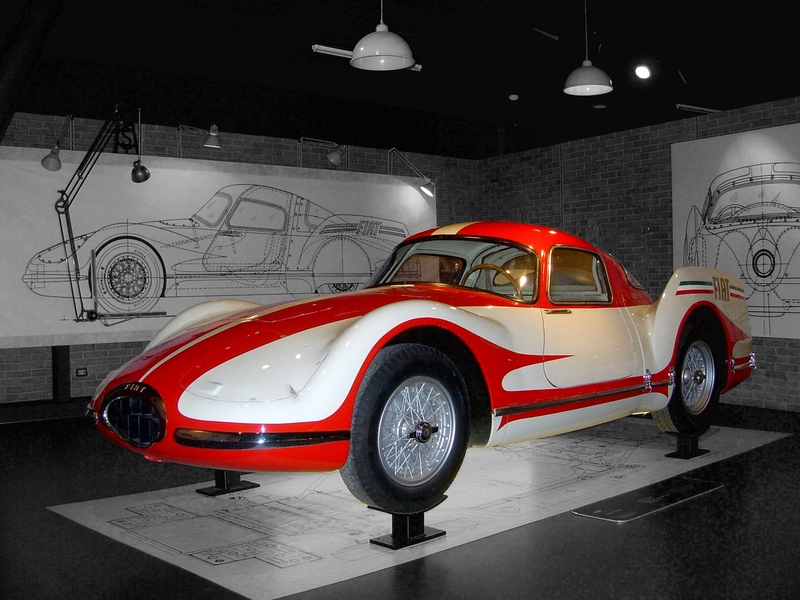
Fiat Turbina

The 1954 36th Salone dell'Automobile was inaugurated by Italian President Luigi Einaudi on 21 April and closed on 2 May. The exhibitors were 450 from 11 countries, including 66 car manufacturers and 22 coachbuilders.

===== Production cars =====
- Alfa Romeo 1900 Super
- Alfa Romeo Giulietta Sprint
- Fiat 1100 Familiare (estate)
- Fiat 1400 A
- Fiat 1900 A
- Lancia Aurelia series II

===== Concept cars and prototypes =====
- Alfa Romeo BAT 7 by Bertone
- Fiat Turbina
- Fibreglass-bodied Fiat 8V
- At least 30 vehicle models from different manufacturers designed by Michelotti

==== 1955 ====
- Abarth 207A Spyder
- Abarth 750 Zagato
- Alfa Romeo BAT 9 concept
- Alfa Romeo Giulietta
- Lancia Florida I

==== 1956 ====
1956

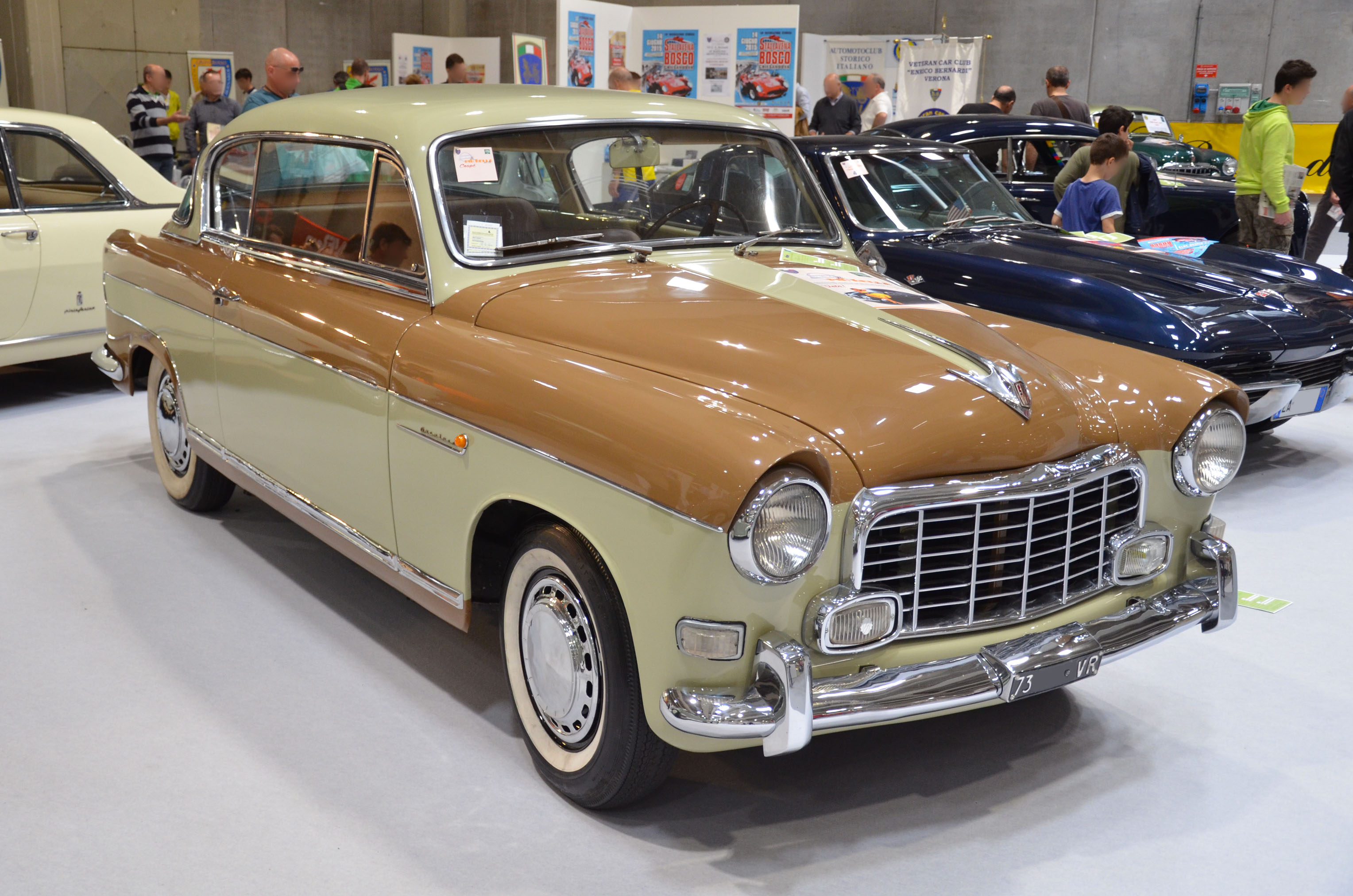
Fiat 1900 B Granluce

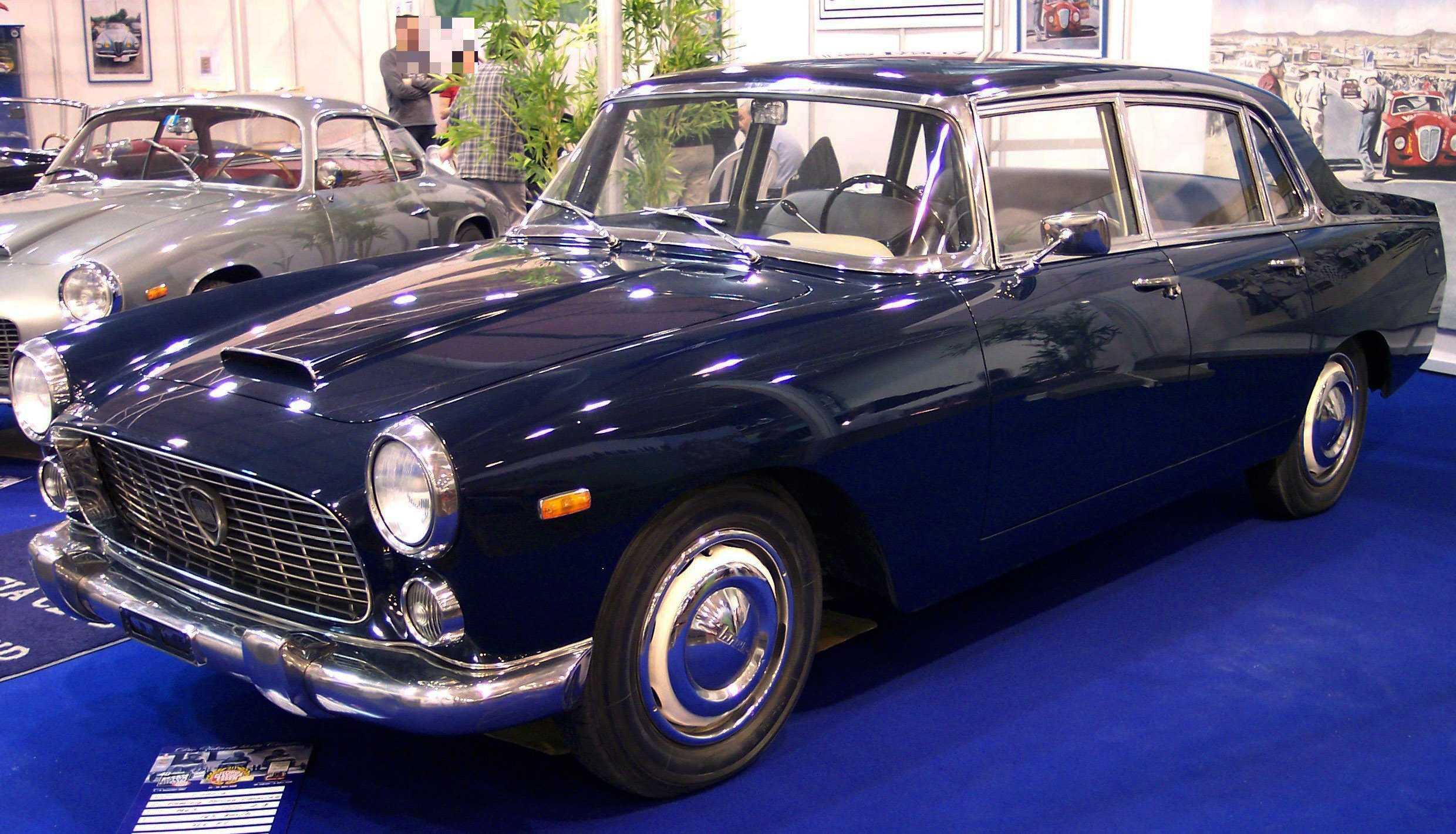
Lancia Flaminia Berlina

Italian President Giovanni Gronchi, escorted by a troop of Corazzieri, inaugurated the 38th Salone Internazionale dell'Automobile on 21 April 1956. The motor show closed on 2 May. The exhibitors were 450 from 13 countries, including 64 car manufacturers, 35 truck and bus manufacturers, and 18 coachbuilders.

===== Production cars =====
- Alfa Romeo Giulietta Sprint Veloce
- Fiat 1400 B
- Fiat 1900 B
- Fiat 600 Taxi
- Lancia Flaminia Berlina

===== Concept cars and prototypes =====
- Alfa Romeo 2000 Sportiva
- Alfa Romeo Superflow by Pinin Farina
- Lancia Appia Cammello

==== 1957 ====
1957

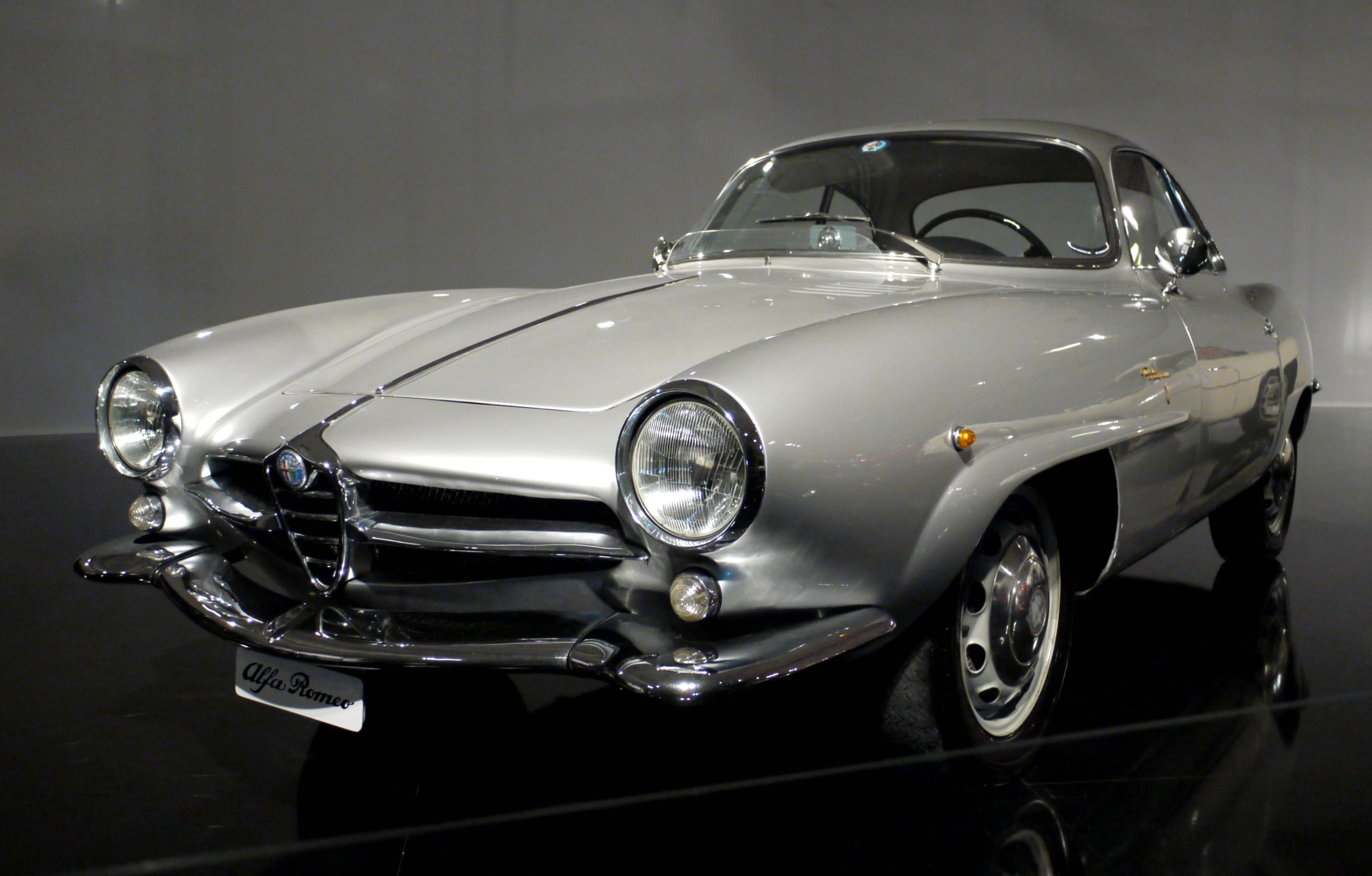
Alfa Romeo Giulietta Sprint Speciale

===== Production cars =====
- Alfa Romeo 2000 Berlina
- Alfa Romeo Giulietta Sprint Speciale by Bertone
- Alfa Romeo Mille (lorry)
- Fiat 1200 Granluce
- Abarth 750 Zagato Spyder
- Lancia Appia Convertibile

===== Concept cars and prototypes =====
- Lancia Florida II by Pinin Farina
- Ferrari 4.9 Superfast by Pinin Farina (second prototype in the Superfast series that spawned the 1964 Ferrari 500 Superfast)

==== 1958 ====
===== Production cars =====
- Abarth 750 GT Bialbero
- Lancia Appia GTE
- Lancia Appia Lusso
- Triumph Italia Prototype Design by Michelotti. Built by and shown on the Vignale Stand.

==== 1959 ====
1959

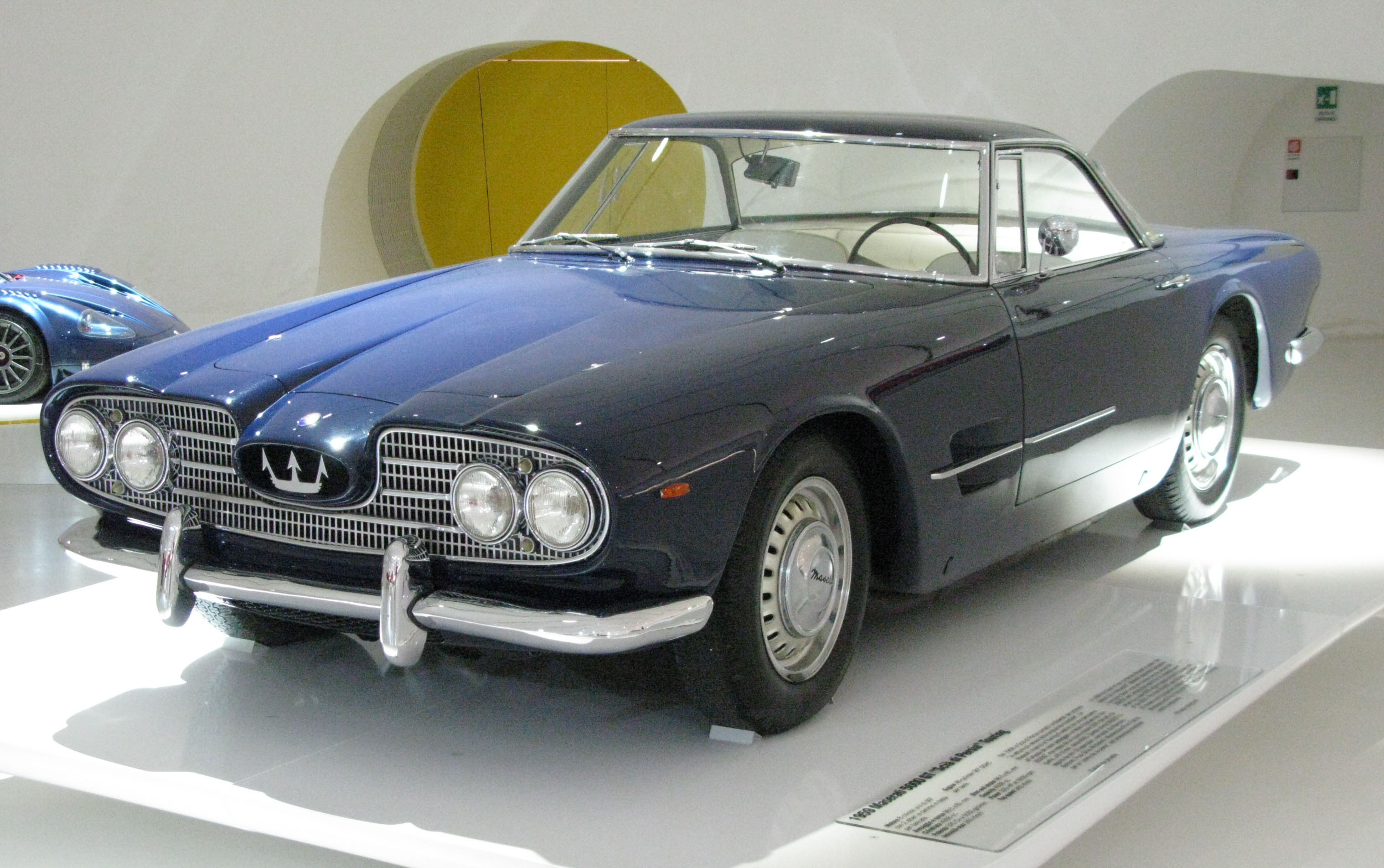
Maserati 5000 GT "Shah of Persia"

The 1959 41st Salone dell'Automobile was inaugurated by President of the Italian Republic Giovanni Gronchi on 31 October and closed on 11 November. There were 490 exhibitors from 12 countries, including 65 car manufacturers.

===== Production cars =====
- Abarth 700S
- Fiat Abarth 2200 Coupé and Spider Allemano (Fiat 2100-derived)
- Chrysler Valiant (European première)
- Lancia Appia Giardinetta Viotti (station wagon)
- Maserati 5000 GT "Shah of Persia"
- Triumph Italia show car Vignale Two cars displayed. One on the Triumph stand and one on the Vignale stand (Italia show car differs slightly from production)

===== Concept cars and prototypes =====
- BMW 3200 Michelotti Vignale
- Ghia Selene

=== 1960s ===
==== 1960 ====
The 42nd edition of the Turin Salon was held from 3 until 13 November 1960.

- Pininfarina X concept
- Lancia Flavia
- Triumph Italia (Production version)

==== 1961 ====
- Triumph Italia Shown on the Triumph stand (Production version)

==== 1962 ====
1962

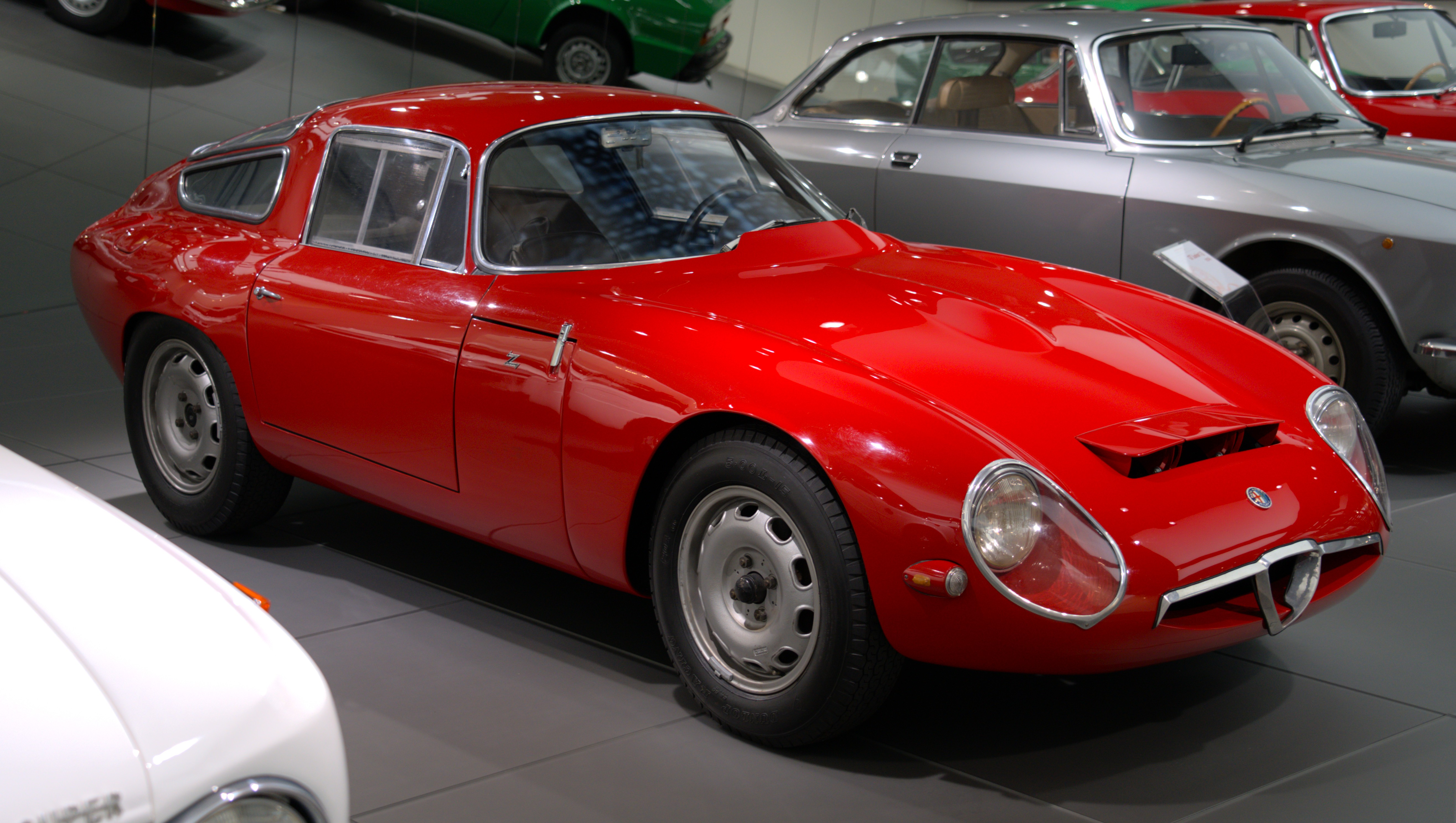
Alfa Romeo Giulia TZ 1

- Alfa Romeo Giulia TZ 1 (Tubolare Zagato)
- Iso Rivolta IR 300

==== 1963 ====
1963

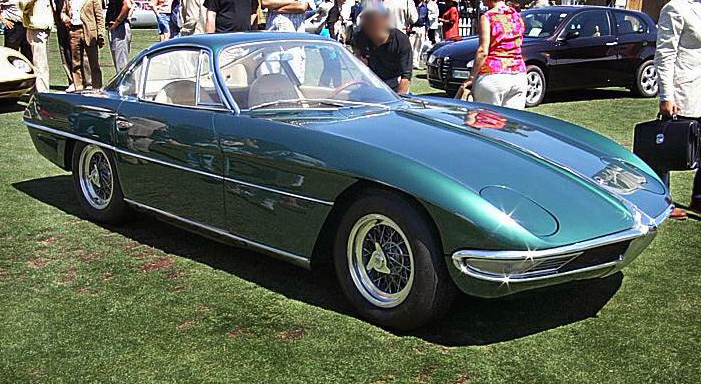
Lamborghini 350GTV

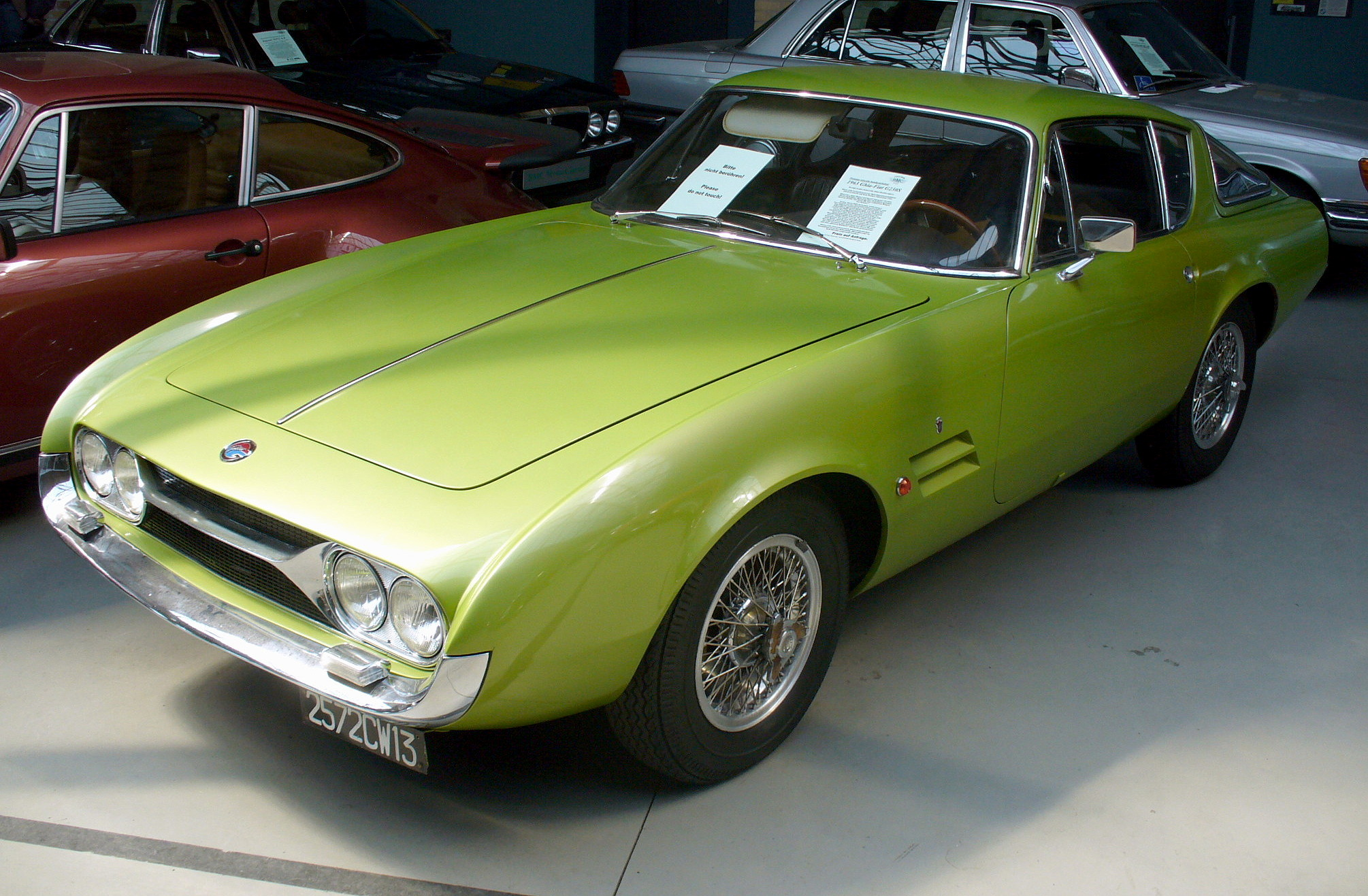
Ghia-Fiat G230S

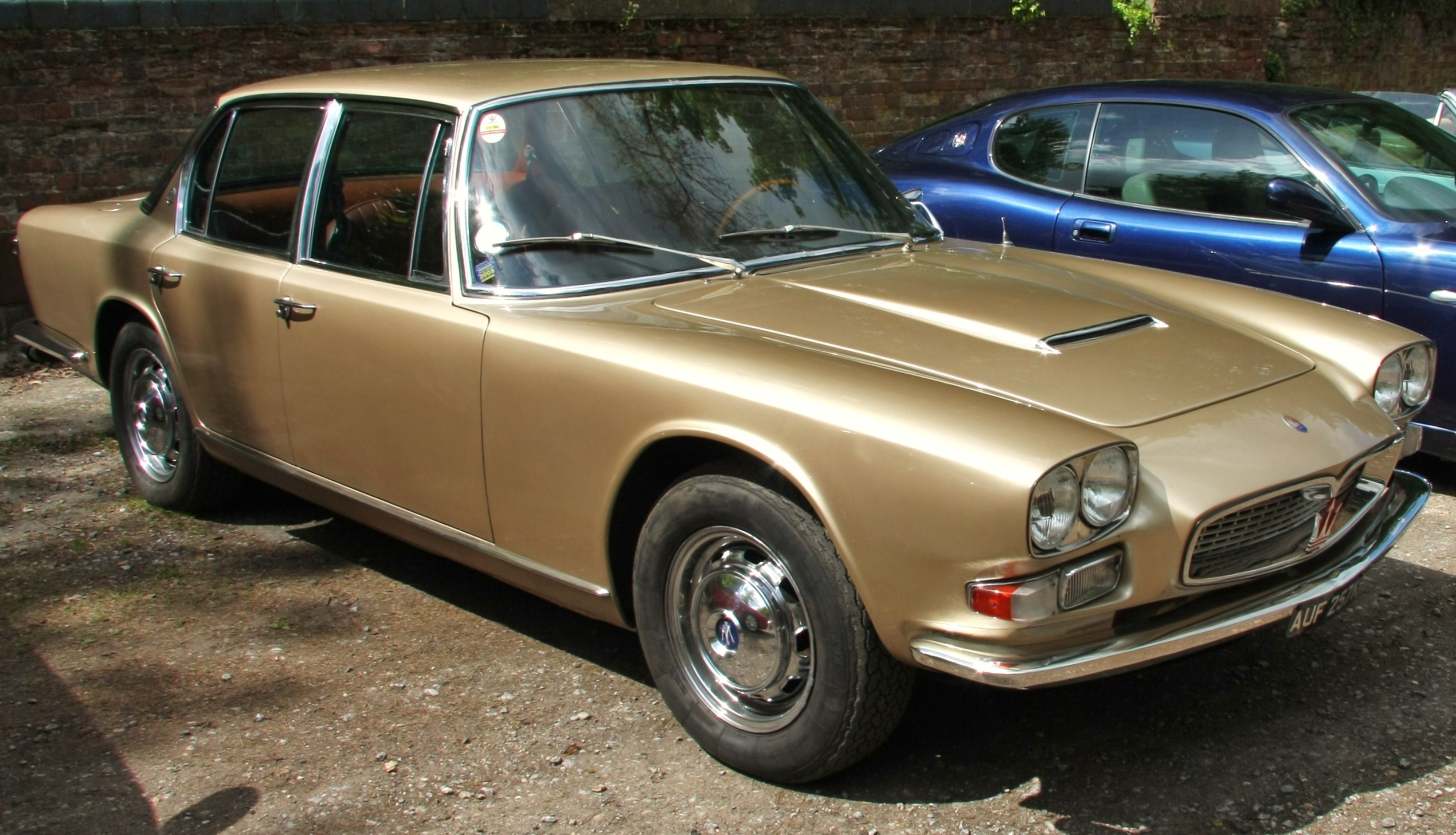
Maserati Quattroporte

The 1963 45th Salone dell'Automobile was inaugurated by Italian President Antonio Segni on 30 October and closed on 10 November. The exhibitors were 524 from 13 countries, including 72 car manufacturers and 21 coachbuilders.

===== Production cars =====
- Autobianchi Stellina (pre-production)
- Iso Grifo
- Lancia Superjolly
- Maserati Quattroporte
- Simca-Abarth 1150

===== Concept cars and prototypes =====
- Ghia-Fiat G230S Due Posti (coupé based on the Fiat 2300)
- Daihatsu Sport Vignale (based on the Daihatsu Compagno)
- De Tomaso Vallelunga
- Fiat 2300 S Lausanne (Pininfarina)
- Lamborghini 350GTV
- Lancia Flaminia Coupé Speciale (Pininfarina)
- OSI 1200 S Spider (based on the Fiat 1100 D)

==== 1964 ====
The 46th Salone dell'Automobile was opened on 31 October 1964 and closed on 11 November. The automobile market did not have a particularly good year, but the salon still garnered considerable interest.

===== Production cars =====
- Autobianchi Primula
- Ford Anglia Torino

==== 1965 ====
- Dino Berlinetta Speciale
- Fiat Moretti Sportiva

==== 1966 ====
- Fiat 124 Spider
- Fiat 500 Ferves Ranger
- Dino Berlinetta GT concept
- Lamborghini Flying Star II concept
- Maserati Ghibli (AM115) prototype

==== 1967 ====
The 49th Salone dell'Automobile was held between 1 and 12 November 1967. It saw the presence of 580 exhibitors from 15 countries, including 70 car manufacturers and 13 coachbuilders.

- Alfa Romeo 33 Stradale
- Lamborghini Marzal concept
- Fiat Dino Coupé

==== 1968 ====
1968

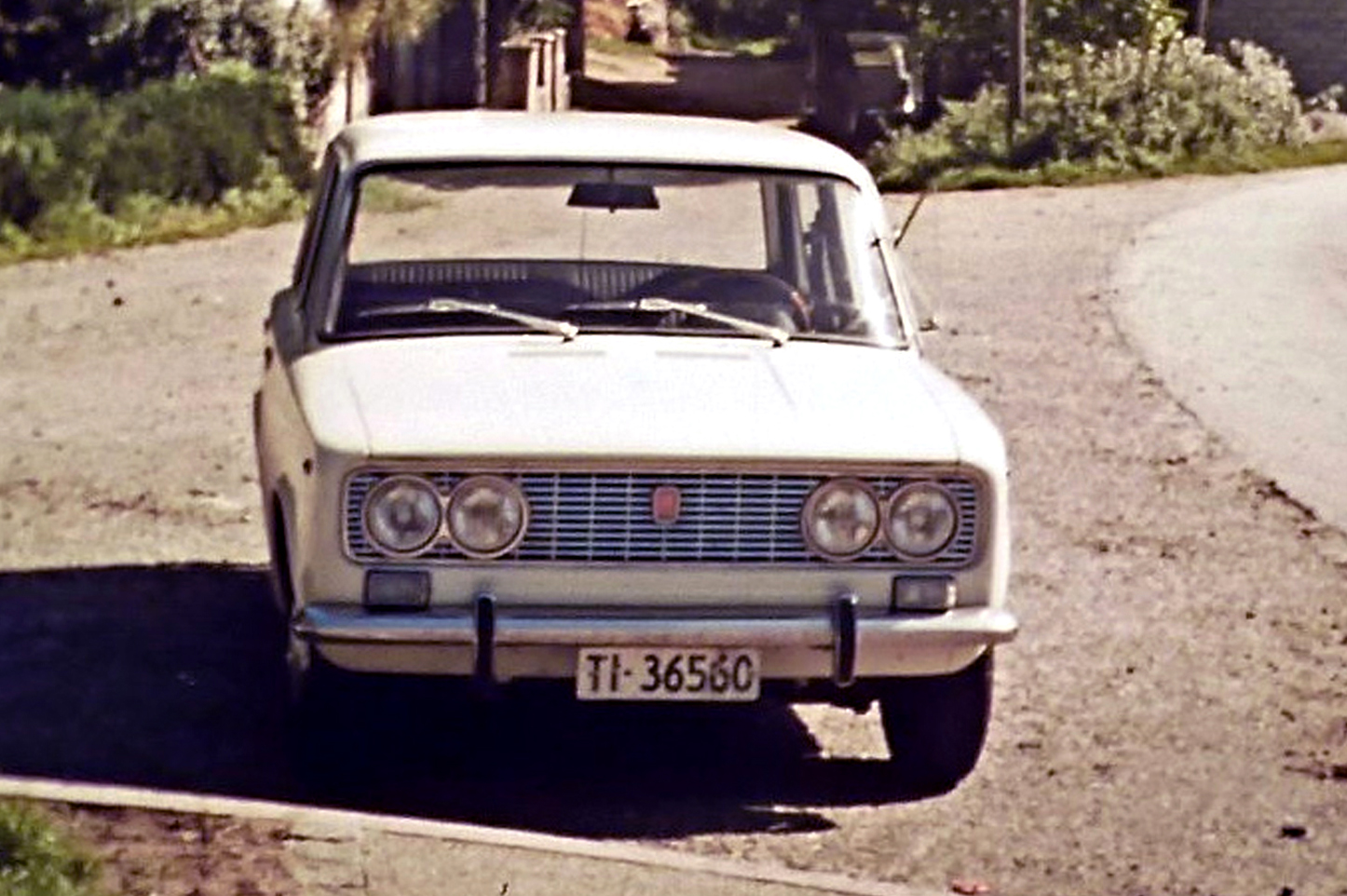
Fiat 124 Special

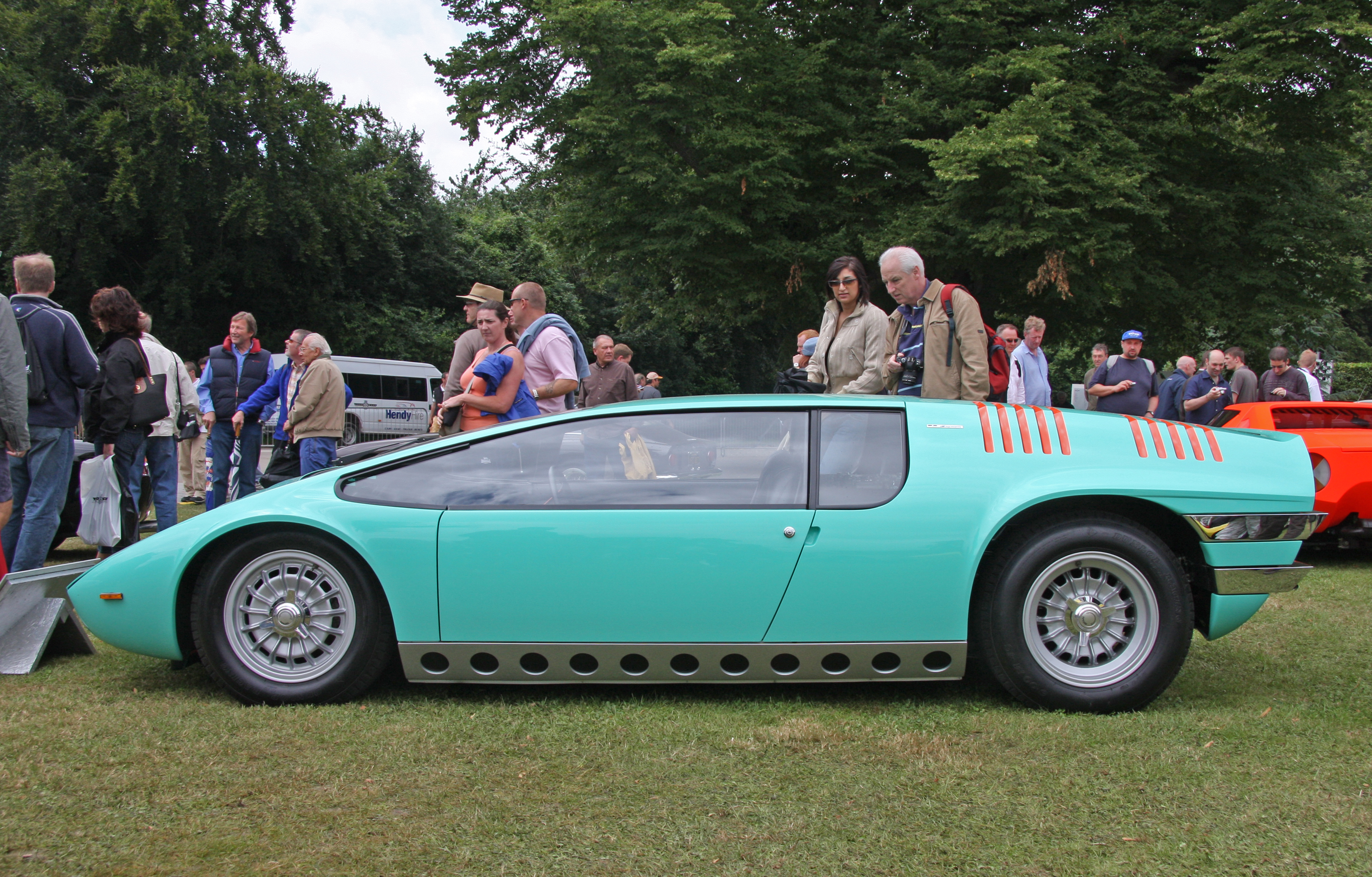
Bizzarrini Manta

The 50th Salone dell'Automobile was held between 30 October and 10 November 1968; there were 496 exhibitors from 14 countries, including 73 car manufacturers and 13 coachbuilders.

===== Production cars =====
- Lancia Fulvia Berlina GTE, Coupé 1.3 S, Sport 1.3 S and Coupé 1.6 HF
- Fiat 124 Special and 125 Special
- Lamborghini Miura S

===== Concept cars and prototypes =====
- Autobianchi coupé prototype
- Alfa Romeo P33 Roadster Pininfarina
- Bandini Saloncino
- Bizzarrini Manta (first work by Italdesign)
- Ferrari P6 Berlinetta Speciale Pininfarina
- Fiat 850 City Taxi
- LMX Sirex (unofficial show exhibit)
- Maserati Simun by Ghia
- Maserati Indy prototype by Vignale

==== 1969 ====
1969

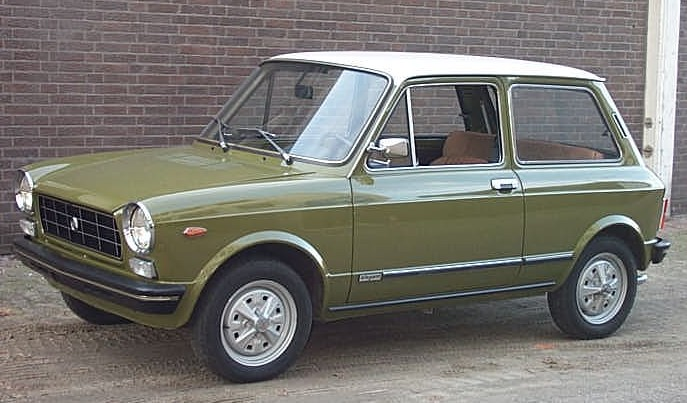
Autobianchi A112

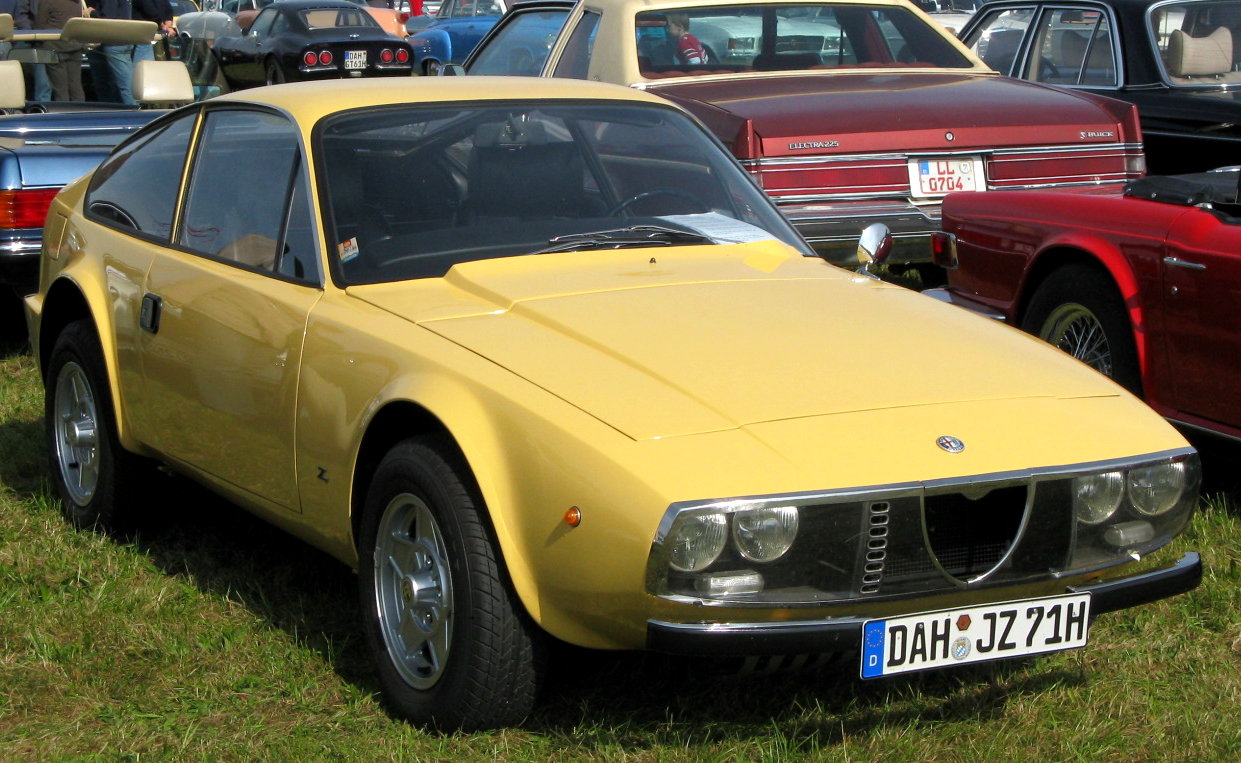
Alfa Romeo Junior Z

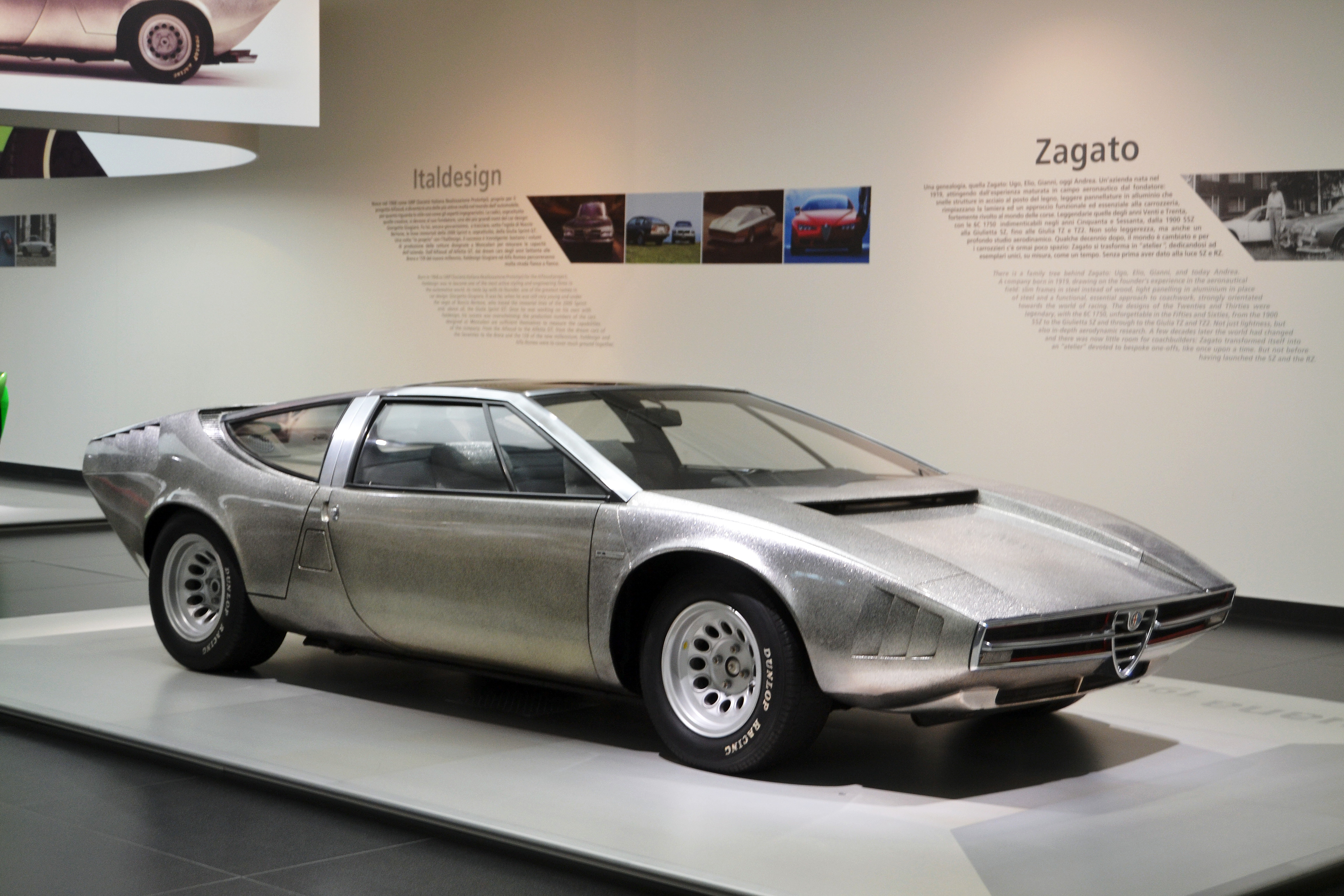
Alfa Romeo Iguana

The 51st Salone dell'Automobile was held between 29 October and 9 November 1969; the exhibitors were 550 from 14 countries, including 64 car manufacturers and 14 coachbuilders.

===== Production cars =====
- Autobianchi A112
- Alfa Romeo Spider series II
- Alfa Romeo Junior Z
- Fiat 124 Sport Coupé and Sport Spider 1600 (series II)
- Fiat 128 Familiare (3-door station wagon)
- Fiat Dino 2400 Coupé and Spider
- Lancia Fulvia Berlina series II

===== Concept cars and prototypes =====
- Alfa Romeo Iguana by Italdesign (33 Stradale-based)
- Autobianchi A112 Runabout by Bertone (roadster with A112 drivetrain)
- Caprera LEM (Fiat 500-based coupé)
- Ferrari 512 S Speciale by Pininfarina
- Fiat 128 Coupé by Bertone
- Fiat 128 coupé and roadster by Moretti
- Fiat 128 Teenager by Pininfarina (beach car)
- Fissore Mongo (Fiat 500-based coupé, design by Aldo Sessano)
- Ikenga GT (designed by David Gittens, coachwork by Charles Williams of Williams & Pritchard)
- Lancia Marica by Ghia (Flaminia-based GT)
- Volvo GTZ by Zagato

=== 1970s ===
==== 1970 ====
1970

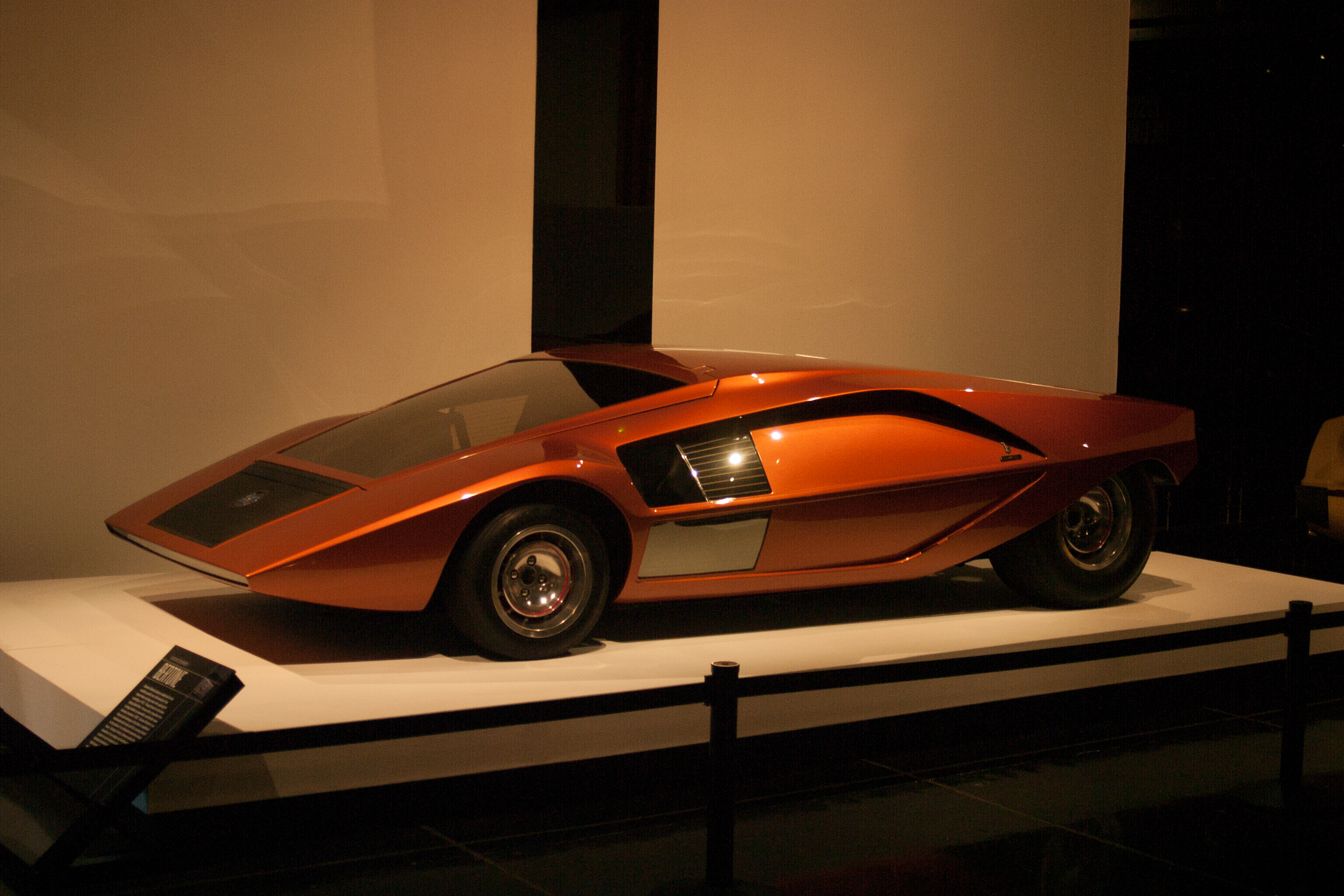
Lancia Stratos Zero

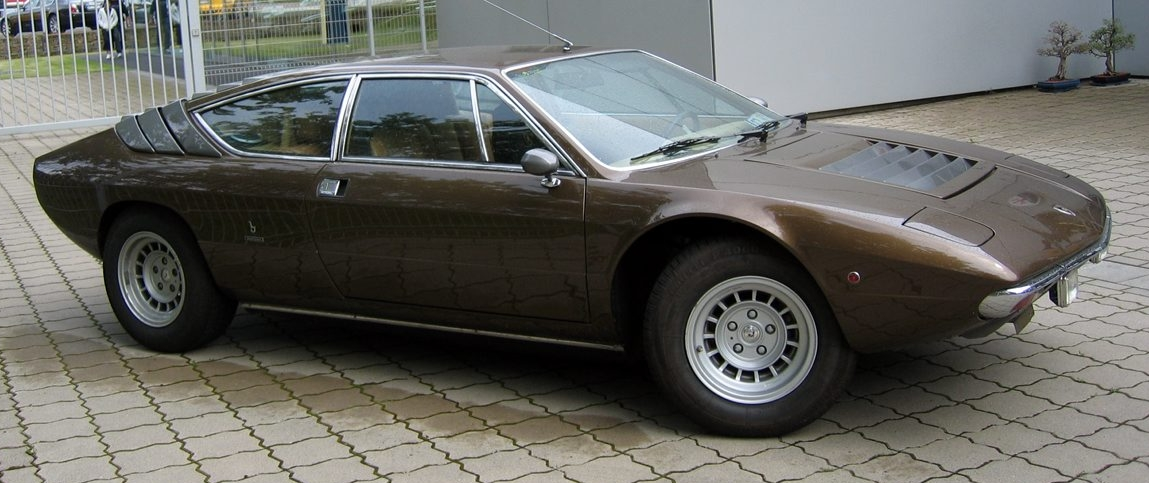
Lamborghini Urraco

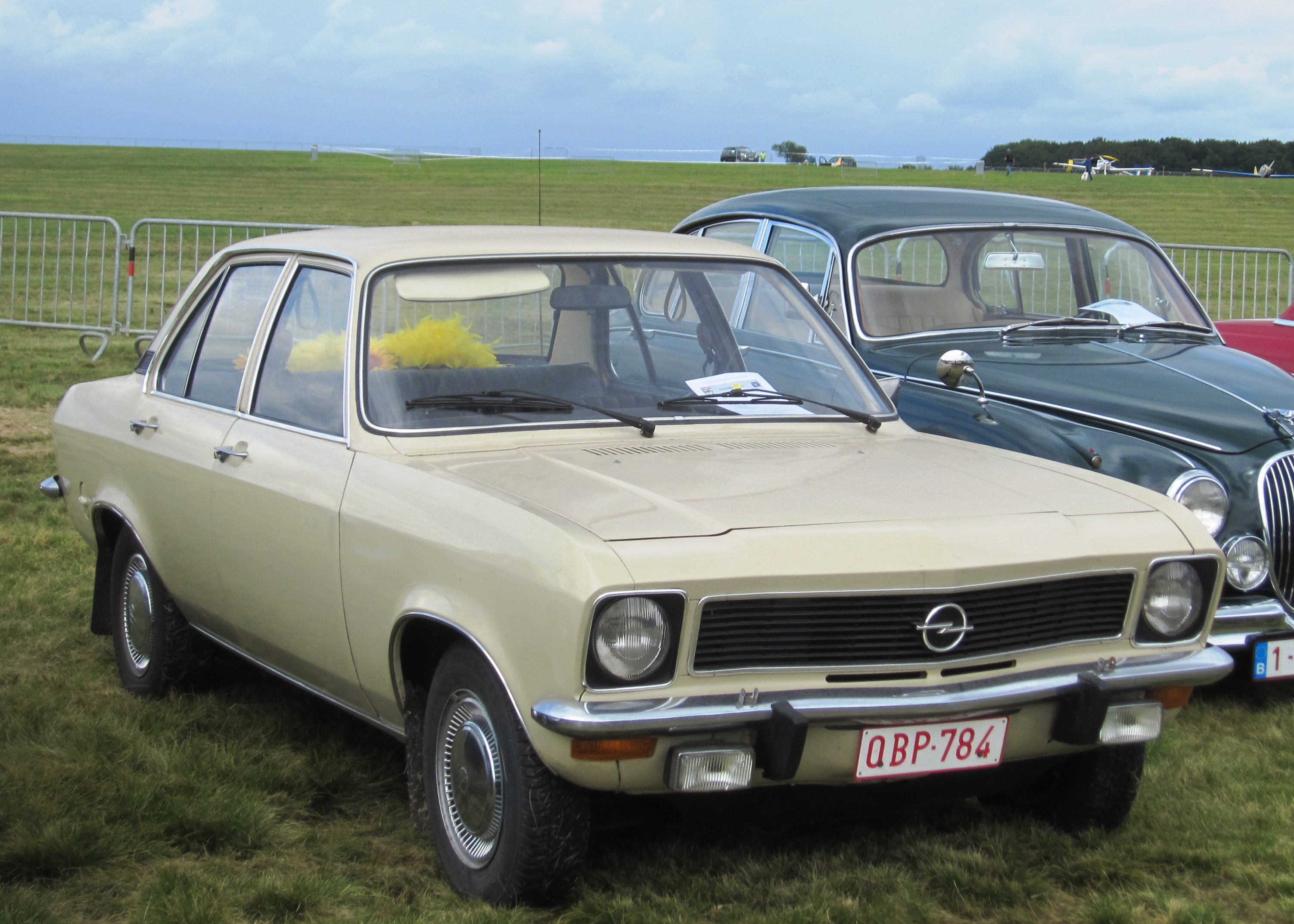
Opel Ascona A

The 52nd Salone dell'Automobile was held between 28 October and 8 November 1970; the exhibitors were 540 from 15 countries, including 71 car manufacturers and 14 coachbuilders.

===== Production cars =====
- Alfa Romeo Giulia 1300 Super
- De Tomaso Deauville
- Fiat 124 familiare, 124 S and 124 Special T
- Fiat 125 Special
- Lamborghini Urraco
- Lancia Fulvia Berlina series II
- Maserati Ghibli and Maserati Indy series II
- Opel Ascona A

===== Concept cars and prototypes =====
- Bertone Shake (dune buggy on a Simca 1200 S chassis)
- Cadillac NART (mid-engined prototype with an Eldorado drivetrain, by Zagato)
- De Tomaso City Car (by Vignale)
- Eurostyle Porsche 914
- Hondina Youngstar (Honda N360-based beach car by Zagato)
- Lancia Stratos Zero (by Bertone)
- Moretti Dragster (2+2 coupé previewing the Fiat 128 Moretti)
- OTAS A112 KL (A112-based coupé designed by Aldo Sessano, built by Fissore)
- Porsche 914/6 Tapiro (by Italdesign)
- Volkswagen 1600 SS (coupé by Francis Lombardi on a VW 1500 chassis)

==== 1971 ====
1971

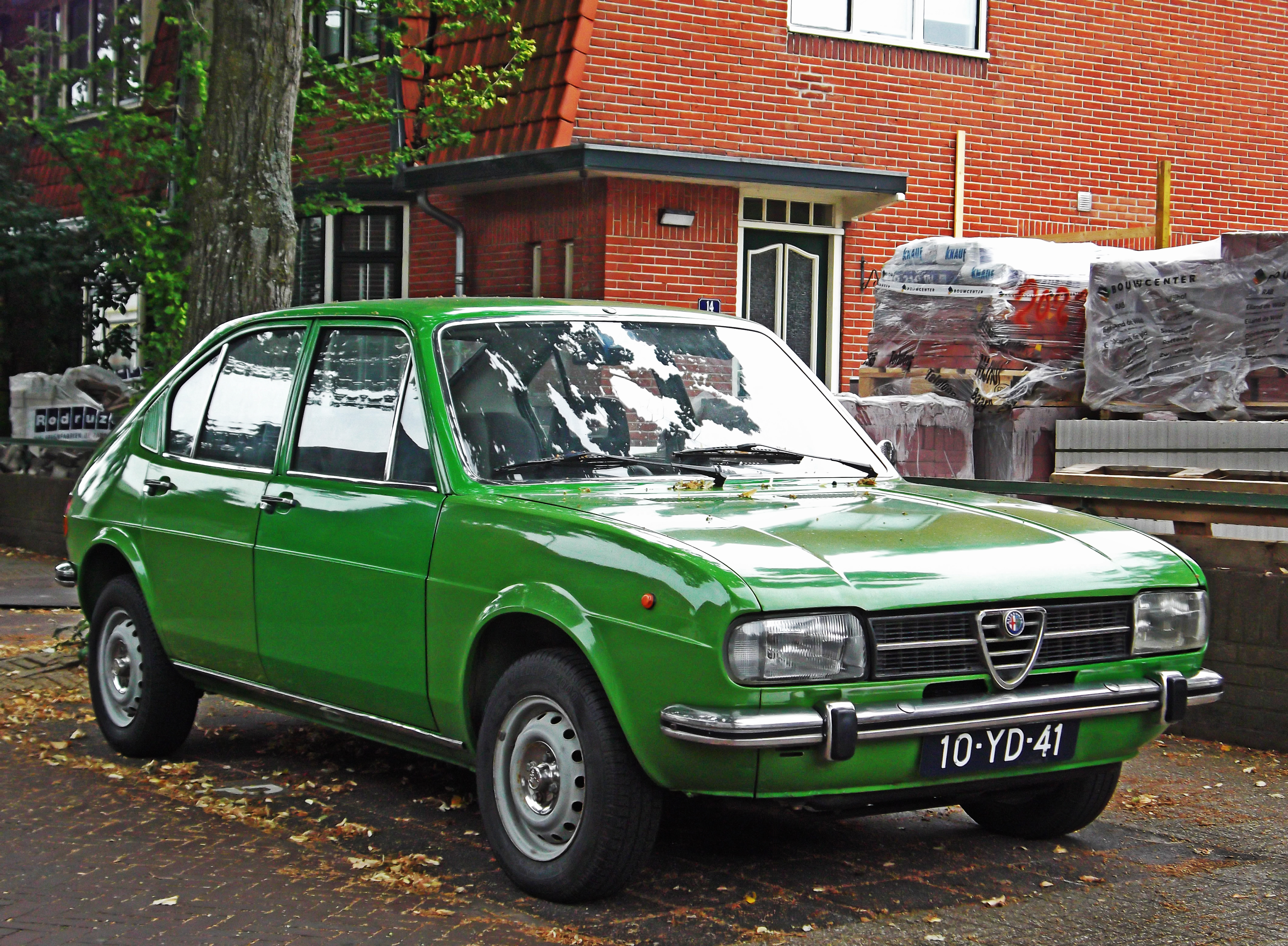
Alfa Romeo Alfasud

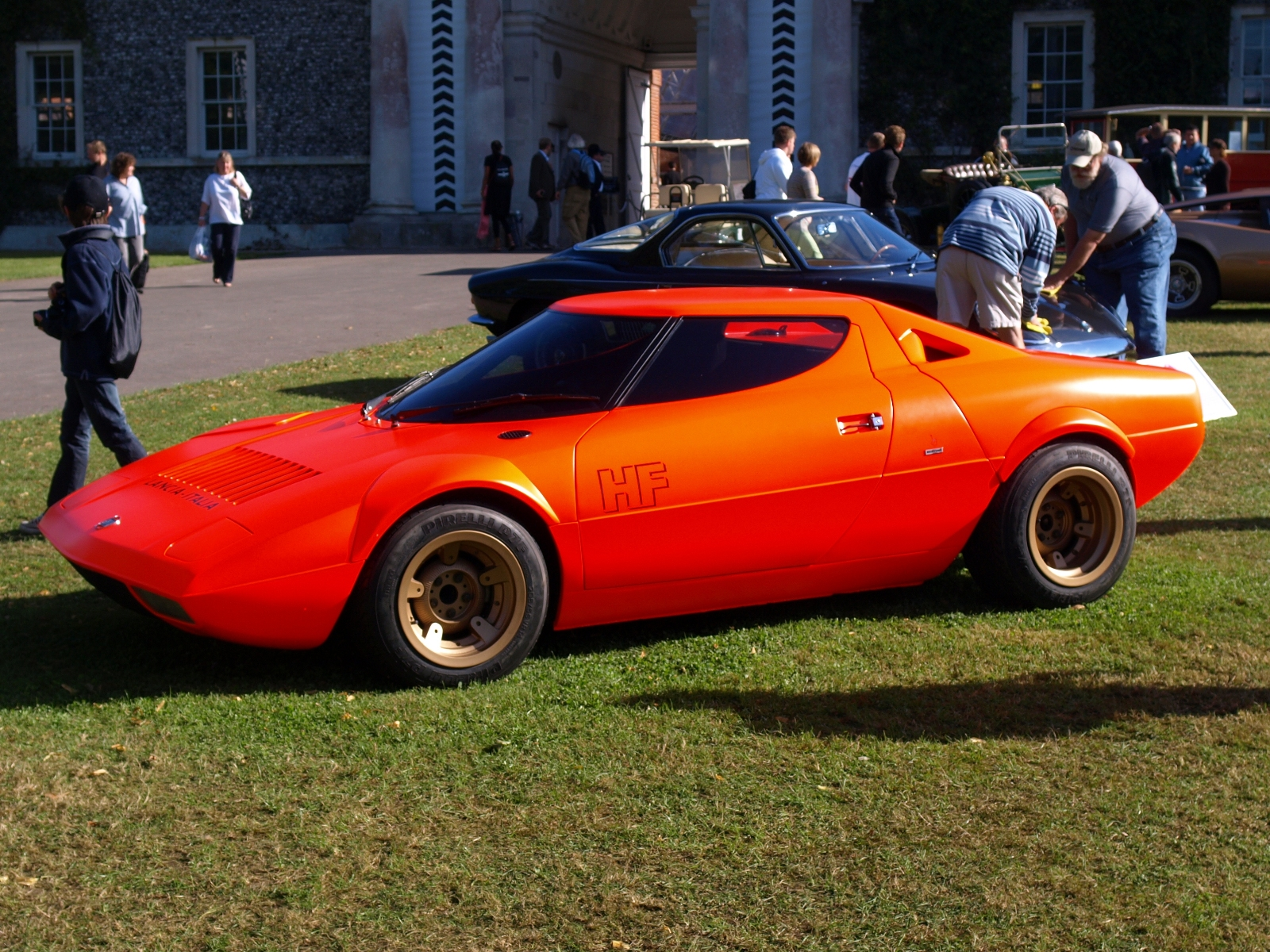
Lancia Stratos HF prototype

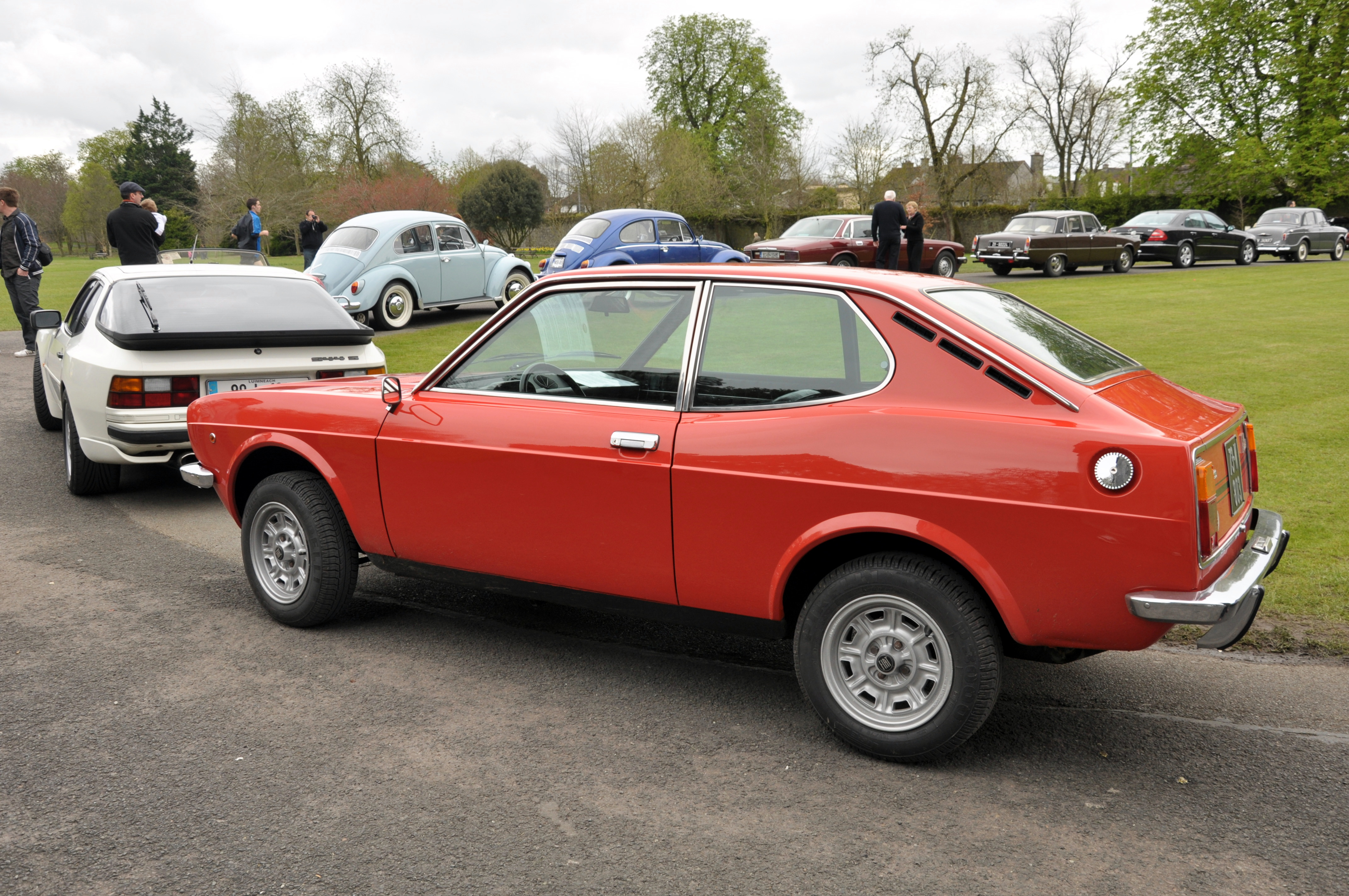
Fiat 128 Sport Coupé

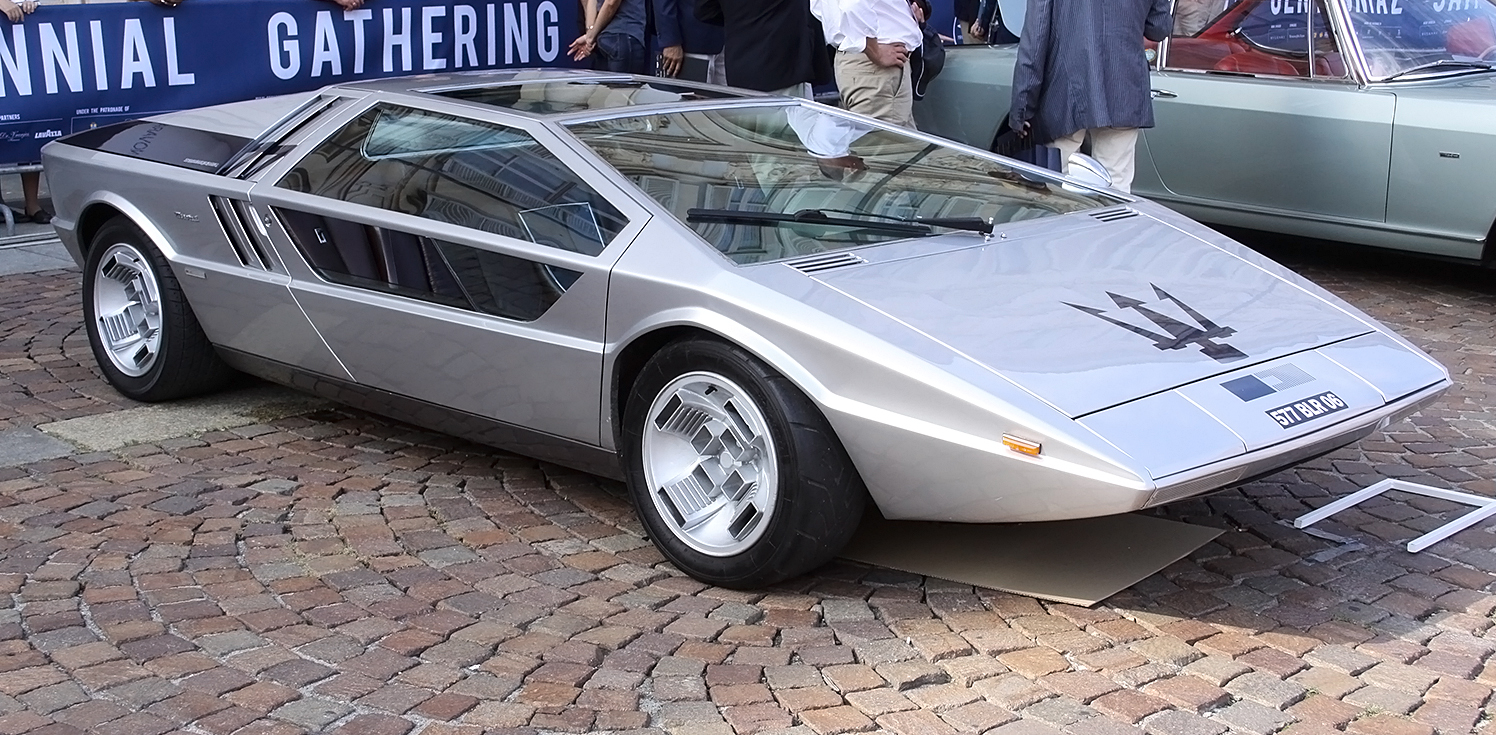
Maserati Boomerang

The 53rd Salone dell'Automobile was held between 3 and 14 November 1971; the exhibitors were 540 from 11 countries, including 64 car manufacturers and 15 coachbuilders.

===== Production cars =====
- Alfa Romeo 2000 Berlina with automatic transmission
- Alfa Romeo Alfasud
- Autobianchi A112 Abarth
- Fiat 128 Sport Coupé
- Lancia 2000 Coupé HF

===== Concept cars and prototypes =====
- Alfa Romeo Caimano by Italdesign
- De Tomaso 1600 Spider by Ghia
- Dunja 1.6 HF by Coggiola
- Ferrari 3Z Spider by Zagato (one-off, 250 California Spyder #2491GT)
- Ferrari Berlinetta Boxer prototype by Pininfarina
- Fiat 127 Coupé by Carrozzeria Coriasco
- Fiat 127 Familiare by Coriasco (3-door station wagon)
- Fiat 127 Coupé, saloon and off-roader by Moretti
- Fiat 127 beach car by Savio
- Ford GT70 by Ghia
- Francis Lombardi 127 Lucciola (four-door 127)
- Francis Lombardi Gipsy (Fiat 127-based off-roader)
- NSU Ro80 2+2-door by Pininfarina
- Lancia Stratos HF prototype by Bertone

==== 1972 ====
1972

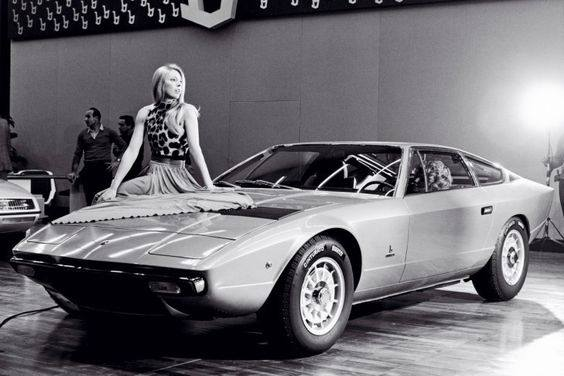
Maserati Khamsin

- Fiat X1/23 "City Car" electric concept
- Fiat 126
- Iso Varedo
- Lombardi FL1 concept
- Maserati Khamsin concept
- Maserati Boomerang concept by Italdesign
- Lotus Esprit concept
- De Tomaso Longchamp

==== 1974 ====
- Innocenti Mini
- Hyundai Pony
- Fiat 131
- Lamborghini Bravo concept
- Maserati Medici I concept

==== 1975 ====
- Alfa Romeo Eagle concept

==== 1976 ====
- Alfa Romeo Alfasud Sprint
- Fiat 126 Cavalletta concept
- Fiat 900T
- Innocenti Mini De Tomaso

==== 1977 ====
- Fiat 131
- Maserati Merak 2000 GT

==== 1978 ====
- Fiat Ritmo
- Ghia Microsport concept
- Lamborghini Faena concept
- Lancia Megagamma concept
- Lancia Sibilo concept

=== 1980s ===
==== 1980 ====
- Ferrari Pinin concept
- Lancia Beta Trevi
- Lancia Medusa concept
- De Tomaso Longchamp GTS

==== 1982 ====
- Italdesign Orca concept
- Lancia Rally 037
- Lancia Delta Turbo 4x4
- Ferrari 208 GTB Turbo
- Maserati Biturbo Emba Cabriolet

==== 1984 ====
- Alfa Romeo 90
- Lancia Thema
- Maserati Biturbo Spyder
- Honda HP-X

==== 1986 ====
- Alfa Romeo Vivace concept (previewing the design of the 164 saloon of 1987 and the 916 series GTV and Spider of 1993)
- Citroën Zabrus concept
- Italdesign Machimoto concept
- Lancia Delta HF 4WD
- Lancia Prisma (second series, including 4WD variant)
- Lancia Thema 8.32
- Lamborghini LM002
- Maserati 228
- Volkswagen Orbit concept

==== 1988 ====
===== Production cars =====
- Fiat Croma Turbo D i.d. (first production diesel direct injection engine)
- Maserati 222

===== Concept cars and prototypes =====
- Bertone Genesis
- Italdesign Asgard
- Italdesign Aspid
- Italdesign Aztec
- Lancia ECV 2 experimental racing car
- Pininfarina HIT

=== 1990–2000 ===
==== 1990 ====
This 63rd Turin Motor Show coincided with Italy hosting the 1990 FIFA World Cup (Italia 90) hence the presentation by Fiat of limited edition models related to that international event.

===== Production cars =====
- Alfa Romeo 75 upgrades - 1.8i Turbo Quadrifoglio Verde & 3.0l V6
- Fiat Panda Italia 90
- Fiat Tempra station wagon
- Fiat Tipo Italia 90
- Fiat Uno Italia 90
- Ford Fiesta XR2i Turbo
- Honda NS-X
- Hyundai S-coupe
- Lancia Thema with electronic suspension control
- Maserati 4.24v.
- Mazda 323
- Mazda RX-7
- Mercedes Benz 190 1.8l
- Nissan 300ZX
- Subaru Legacy
- Suzuki Swift GTi
- Toyota Corolla RV wagon
- Toyota Land Cruiser LJ-70
- Volvo 480 ES convertible
- Bugatti ID90

===== Concept cars and prototypes =====
- Bertone Nivola
- Ghia Zig
- Ghia Zag
- Jaguar Kensington by Italdesign Giugiaro (design later adapted for the Daewoo Leganza)
- SEAT Proto TL by Italdesign Giugiaro
- Bugatti ID 90 by Italdesign Giugiaro

==== 1992 ====
Production cars

- Maserati Ghibli (AM336)

===== Concept cars and prototypes =====
- Bertone Blitz concept
- Fiat Cinquecento 4x4 Pick-up by Pininfarina
- Fiat Cinquecento Birba by Maggiora
- Fiat Cinquecento by Boneschi
- Fiat Cinquecento Cita by Stola
- Fiat Cinquecento Fionda by Coggiola
- Fiat Cinquecento ID by Italdesign
- Fiat Cinquecento Rush by Bertone
- Fiat Panda Destriero by Stola
- Ford Ghia Focus concept
- I.DE.A Grigua
- Italdesign Biga
- Italdesign Columbus
- Lancia Magia by IAD
- Pininfarina Ethos (powered by an orbital engine)

==== 1994 ====
1994

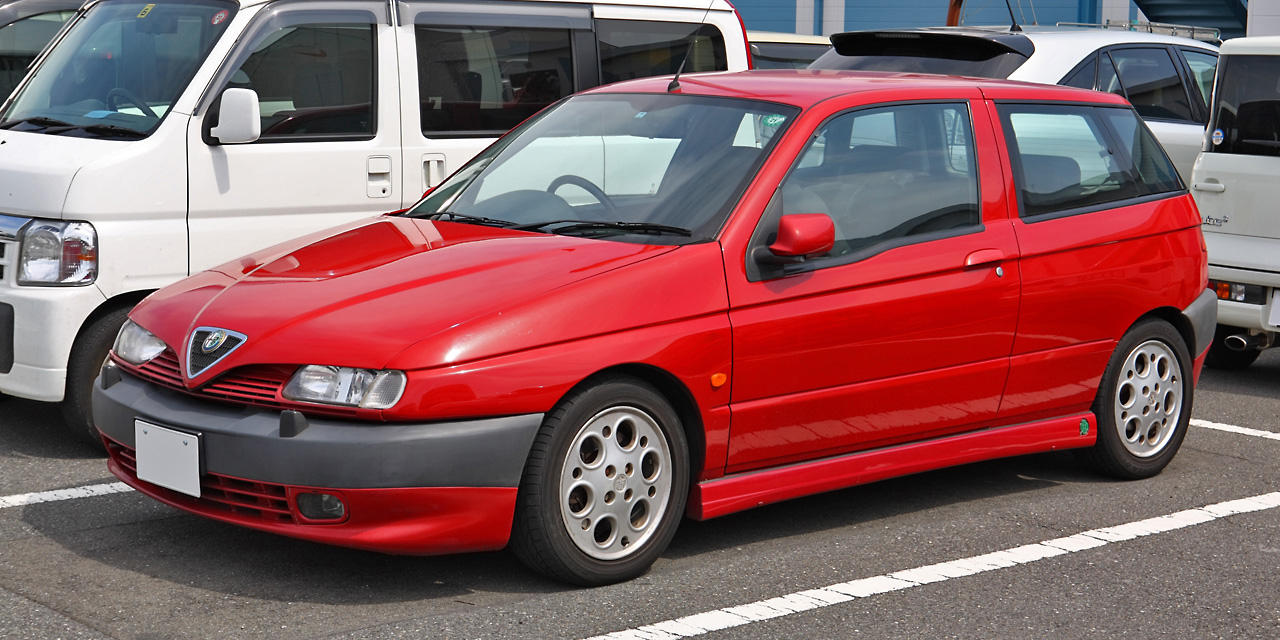
Alfa Romeo 145

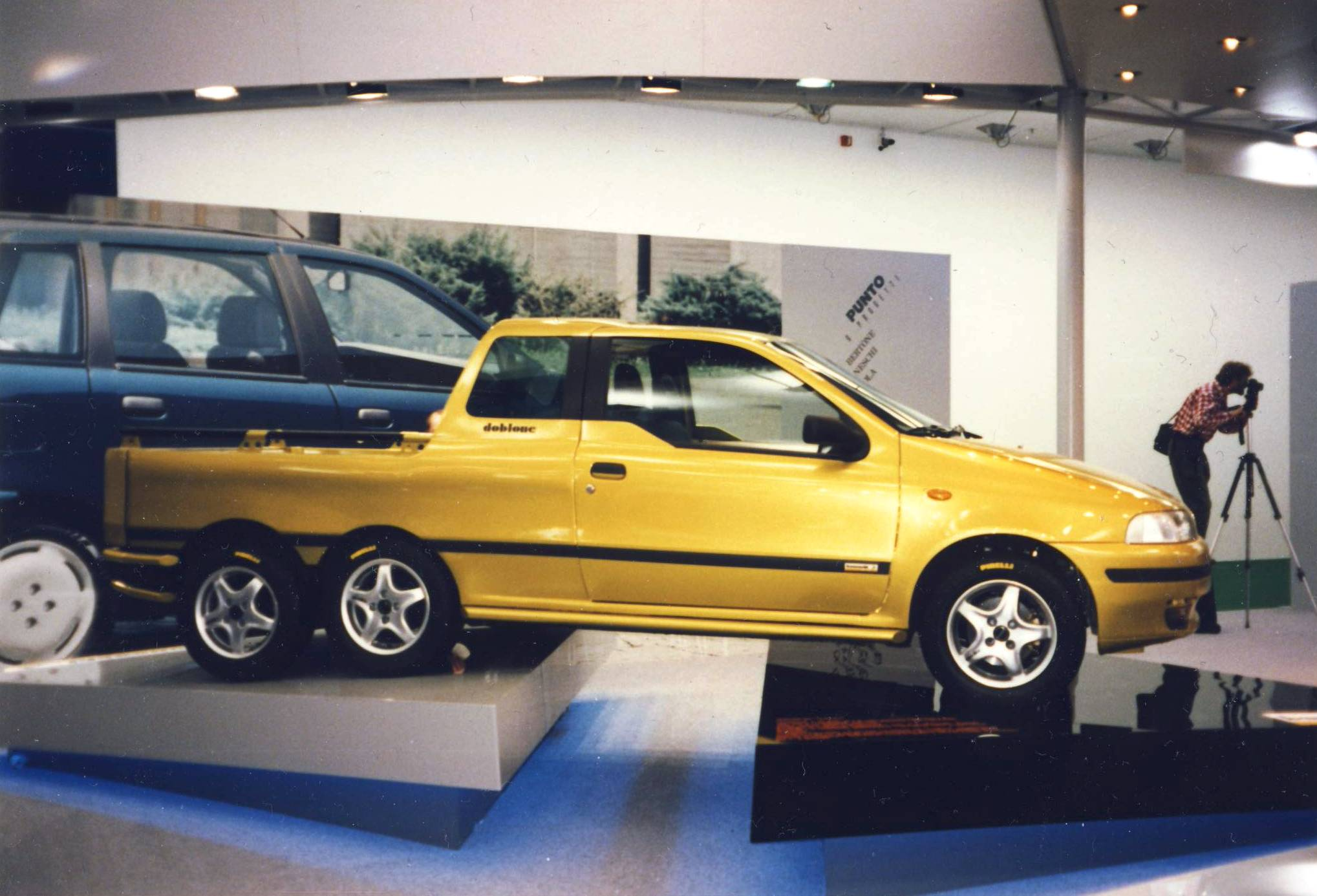
Punto Doblone by Boneschi

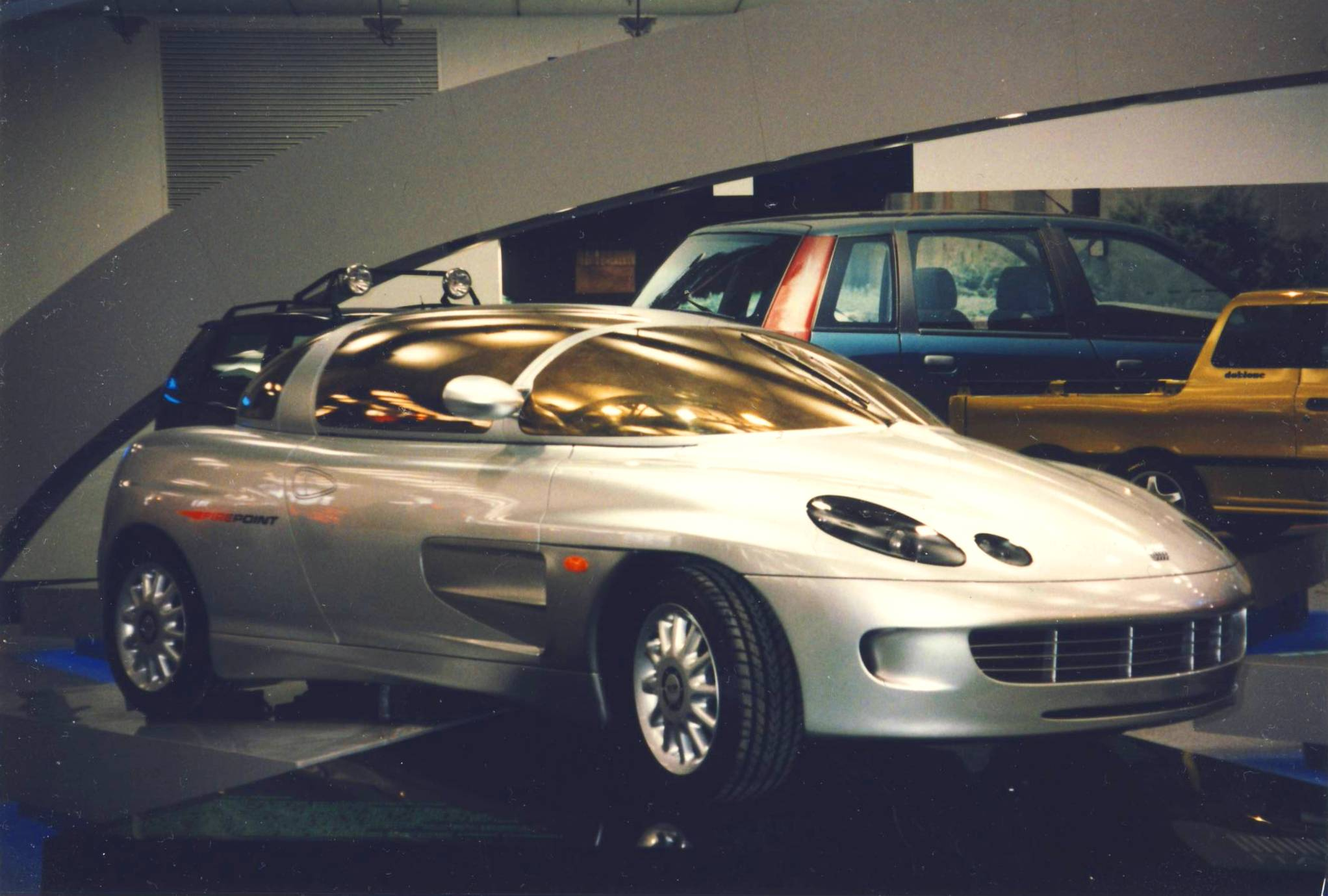
Punto Firepoint by Italdesign

===== Production cars =====
- Alfa Romeo 145
- Maserati Quattroporte (fourth generation)
- Nissan Micra Cabriolet

===== Concept cars and prototypes =====
- Fiat Firepoint (ItalDesign)
- Fiat Lampo by I.DE.A
- Fiat Punto 4x4 TL by Giannini
- Fiat Punto Doblone by Boneschi
- Fiat Punto Monomille by Zagato
- Fiat Punto Racer by Bertone
- Fiat Punto Surf by Coggiola
- Fiat Spunto by Pininfarina
- Fiat Scia by Maggiora
- Fioravanti Sensiva
- Mercedes-Benz SLK I Concept
- Pininfarina Ethos 3

==== 1996 ====
- Fiat Barchetta Coupé by Maggiora

==== 1998 ====
The 67th Turin Motor Show was held from 24 April to 3 May.

===== Production cars =====
- Fiat Multipla

===== Concept cars and prototypes =====
- Alfa Romeo Dardo by Pininfarina
- Covini C36
- Lancia Diàlogos
- Stola Abarth Monotipo

==== 2000 ====
The 68th Turin Motor Show held in June 2000 was the last edition, as in 2002, the event was cancelled and never held again. The change in date was to avoid clashing with the Geneva Motor Show. The show first requested for a June date in March 1998.

===== Production cars =====
- Alfa Romeo 147

===== Concept cars and prototypes =====
- Ferrari Rossa by Pininfarina
- Ford Streetka Concept

=== 2015–2019 ===
==== 2015 ====
From 2015, the Turin Motor Show returned, however no longer based on a large and costly static exhibition format. Instead, it became a free public festival, held at the historical Parco del Valentino, and featured demonstrations along the route used for various motorsport grands prix between 1935 and 1954.

===== Production cars =====
- Alfa Romeo 4C
- Alfa Romeo 4C Spider
- Alfa Romeo Giulietta
- Alfa Romeo Mito
- Audi R8
- BMW M3
- Ferrari 488 GTB
- Ferrari California T
- Fiat 500 vintage '57
- Lamborghini Aventador SV
- Lamborghini Huracán
- Maserati Quattroporte
- Maserati Ghibli
- Mercedes-Benz Mercedes-AMG GT
- Pagani Zonda Revolución
- Porsche 911 GT3
- Porsche Cayman GT4

===== Concept cars and prototypes =====
- Ferrari FXX-K (13)
- Italdesign Giugiaro Gea
- Pininfarina Sergio
- Pininfarina Cambiano
- Umberto Palermo Design Mole Costruzione artigianale modello 001
- Umberto Palermo Design Lucrezia
- Umberto Palermo Design Vittoria

==== 2016 ====
===== Production cars =====
- Abarth 595
- Alfa Romeo Giulia
- Ferrari GTC4Lusso
- Fiat 500 S
- Pagani Huayra BC

===== Concept cars and prototypes =====
- Mazzanti Evantra Millecavalli
- Mole Valentino
- Frangivento Asfanè
- Model 5 Genesi
- Mole Luce

==== 2017 ====
===== Production cars =====
- Abarth 695 XSR
- Abarth 124 Spider
- Alpine A110
- Fiat 500L Cross
- Fiat Fullback Cross
- Fiat 500 60th
- Jeep Compass
- Jeep Wrangler
- Alfa Romeo Giulia
- Alfa Romeo Stelvio
- Maserati Levante
- Maserati Ghibli
- Ferrari 488 Spider special green (25)
- Ferrari GTC4LussoT
- BMW 4 Series Cabrio
- BMW 4 Series Gran Coupé ICONIC 4 EDITION
- BMW M4 CS

===== Concept cars and prototypes =====
- Fittipaldi EF7 Vision Gran Turismo by Pininfarina.
- Lancia ZERO37 4WD Hybrid Politecnico di Torino
- Italdesign Zerouno

==== 2018 ====
===== Production cars =====
- Aston Martin DB11
- BMW i8 Roadster
- Ferrari Portofino
- Ferrari 488 Pista
- Ferrari GTC4Lusso

===== Concept cars and prototypes =====
Umberto Palermo Alfa Romeo 4C Mole Costruzione Artigianale 001

==== 2019 ====
===== Production cars =====
- Abarth 595 Esseesse
- Abarth 124 Spider Rally 2019
- Alfa Romeo Stelvio Ti
- Ferrari SF90 Stradale
- Jeep Renegade Hybrid Plug-in
- Peugeot 508 SW HYbrid

===== Concept cars and prototypes =====
- Alfa Romeo Tonale
- Alfa Romeo Giulia Quadrifoglio Ocra
- Fiat Centoventi
- Nissan Leaf Nismo Rc
- Mole Costruzione Artigianale Almas

==== 2020 ====
The following vehicles were to be presented at the show in 2020:

- Alfa Romeo Giulia (upgrade)
- Alfa Romeo Giulia GTA
- Alfa Romeo Giulia GTAm
- Alfa Romeo Stelvio (upgrade)
- Ferrari Roma

Cancelled and transferred to Milan.

==== 2024 ====
The Turin Motor Show has been reinstated, called Salone Auto Torino and took place alongside the Autolook Week event from 13 to 15 September 2024. The Autolook Week was integrated into the Salone Auto Torino. The following vehicles were showcased at the show in 2024:

==== 2025 ====
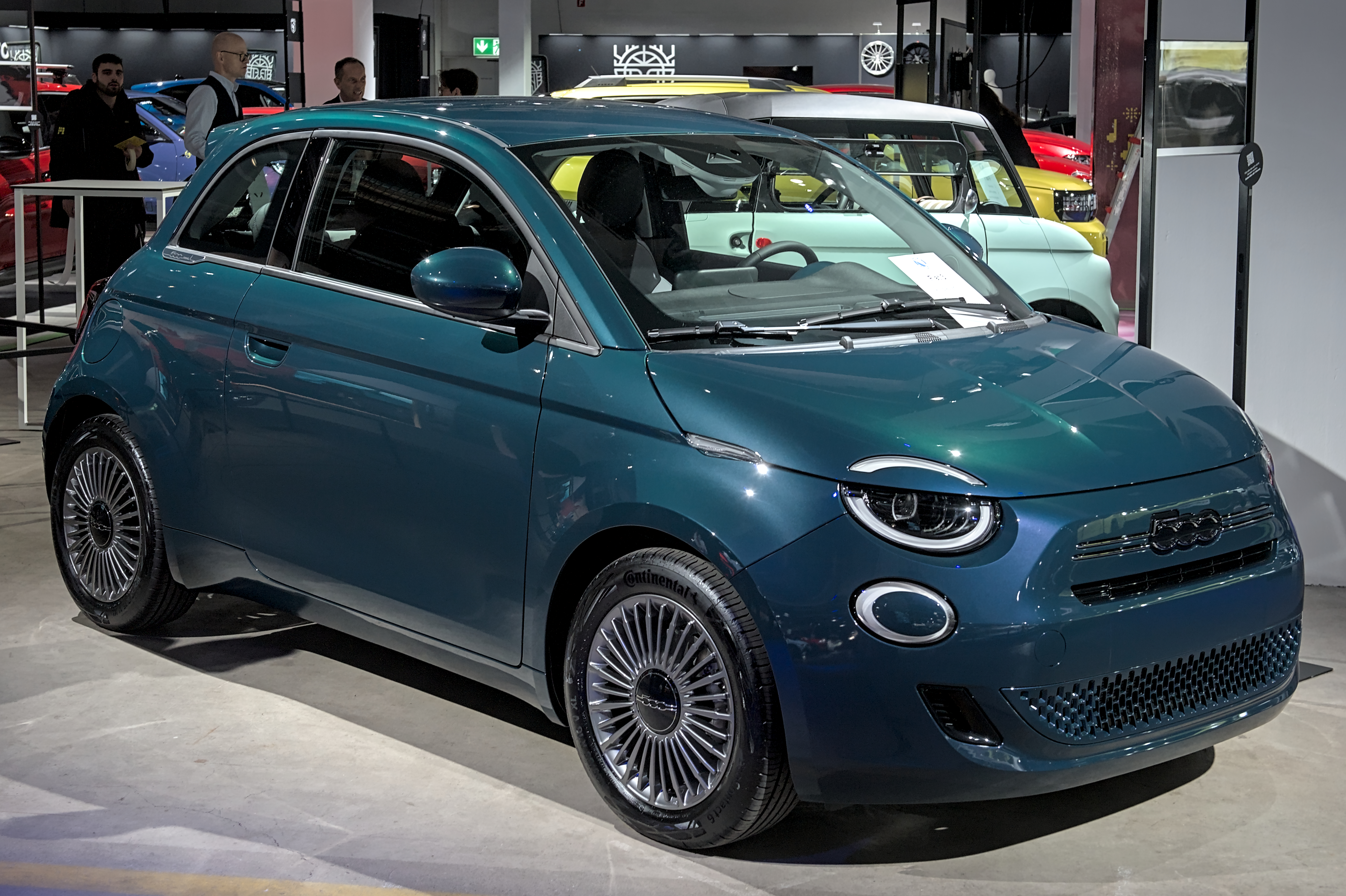
Fiat 500 Hybrid Torino built in the Mirafiori Factory

The Salone Auto Torino was held from 26 to 28 September 2025. The exhibition features production cars, sports cars, limited-edition sports cars, historic sports and racing cars, modern racing cars, Formula One cars, historic rally cars, rally cars, concept cars, and prototypes. A compendium of Italian automotive culture. The exhibition was held in Piazza Castello, Palazzo and Giardini Reali and was a great public success. The following vehicles were showcased at the show in 2025:

- Abarth 600e Scorpionissima
- Alfa Romeo Junior Ibrida
- Fiat 500 Hybrid Torino
- Ferrari SF-25 Lewis Hamilton, winner of the Sprint race of the 2025 Chinese Grand Prix.
- Ferrari 12 Cilindri
- Ferrari 499P Modificata
- Ferrari 296 Challenge
- Ferrari 365 GTB/4
- Ferrari Purosangue
- Ferrari SF90 Spider
- Ferrari 296 GTB
- Ferrari Roma Spider
- Lancia Stratos HF (1976)
- Maserati MCPura
- Maserati MCPura Cielo

==== 2026 ====
The Salone Auto Torino will be held from 11 to 13 September 2026. The Giardini dei Musei Reali will host the celebrations for Lancia's 120th anniversary. The following vehicles will be showcased at the show in 2026:

- Alfa Romeo Tonale Plug-in Hybrid Q4 Veloce
- Lamborghini Fenomeno
- Lamborghini Temerario
- Lamborghini Miura (1966)
- Lamborghini Urus SE
- Lamborghini Revuelto
- Lancia Gamma (2026)
- Maserati GranTurismo Trofeo
- Maserati Grecale Trofeo
