= Autolook Week =

Annual motorsport festival in Italy

- Status: Active
- Genre: Auto show
- Begins: 7 September 2022
- Ends: 11 September 2022
- Frequency: Annually
- Location: Turin
- Country: Italy
- Years active: 2022–
- Most recent: 13–15 September 2024
- Previous event: 2–3 September 2023
- Next event: 2025
- Attendance: 180,000
- Website: www.autolookweek.com

The Autolook Week is an annual motorsport festival held for the first time in Turin from 7 to 11 September 2022.

The motorsport festival was presented by Andrea Levy, organizer of this event, of the Turin Auto Show held from 2015 to 2019 at Parco del Valentino and of Milano Monza Open-Air Motor Show (MIMO), together with Stefano Lo Russo, Mayor of Turin, and Alberto Cirio, president of the Piedmont Region.

The event took place in the streets of the center of Turin on the occasion of the Centenary of the Autodromo Nazionale di Monza and the 2022 Italian Grand Prix.

== 2025 ==
_{Turin 26–28 September 2025}
The following vehicles were showcased at the festival in 2025:

- Ferrari F80 (2025)

== 2024 ==
_{Turin, 13–15 September 2024}
The following vehicles were showcased at the festival in 2024:

- Ferrari 499P - #50 Ferrari AF Corse winner at 2024 24 Hours of Le Mans.
- F1 Shadow DN1 (1973) Graham Hill.

== 2023 ==
_{Turin, 2–3 September 2023}
The following vehicles were showcased at the festival in 2023:

- Dallara Stradale (2017) - 777 Collection Andrea Levy

== 2022 ==
_{Turin, 7–11 September 2022}
The following vehicles were showcased at the festival in 2022:

- Ferrari 488 Challenge Evo
- Ferrari 296 GTB
- Formula One Ferrari F399 Michael Schumacher (1999)
- Lancia Beta Montecarlo (1980)
- Lancia Stratos (1975)
- Fiat Abarth 124 Rally (1973)
- Toyota Celica GT4 ST165 Carlos Sainz Sr. (1990)
- Lancia LC2
- IndyCar Reynard Honda Alex Zanardi (1996)
- Ligier F1 GS 11/15 Lafitte
- Ferrari 312 T5 Villeneuve (1980)
- Telaio Nazzaro 3 1914
- Cisitalia 202 SMM “Nuvolari” (1947)
- Lancia D24 (1953)
- Fiat 130 HP (1907)
- Monaco Nardi Chichibio (1932)
- Alfa Romeo 8C 2300 (1934)
- Alfa Romeo 155 V6 TI Larini (1996)
- Ferrari 500 F2 Ascari (1952)
- FIAT 131 Abarth Rally Gr. 4 with "Alitalia" livery
- Lancia Delta Integrale Gr. A
- VR46 MotoGP (2022)
