= Adami (car) =

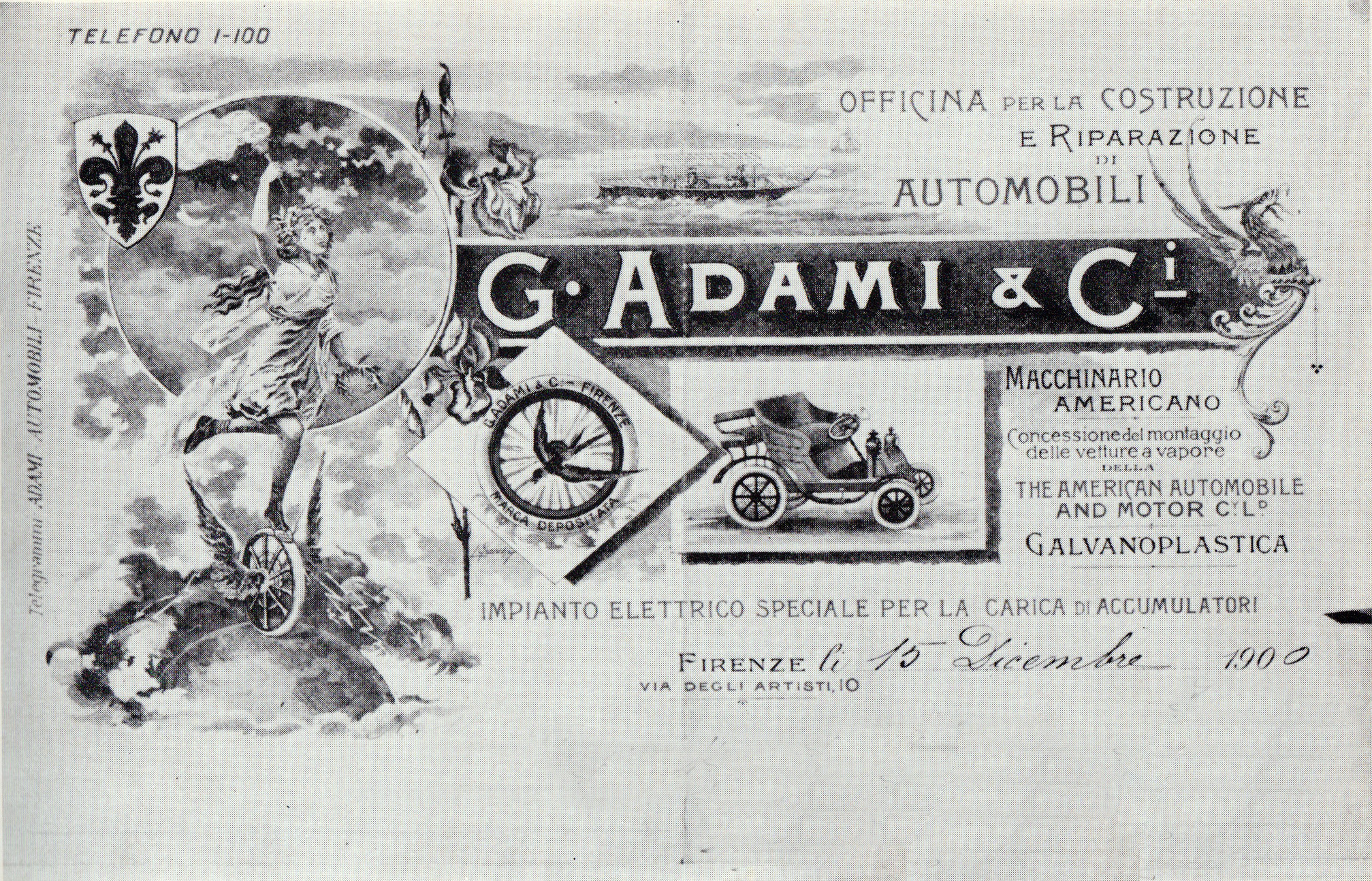
- Invitation to view the Adami

Overview
- Manufacturer: G. Adami & Ci.
- Production: Florence
- Model years: 1901–1906
- Designer: Guido Adami

Powertrain
- Engine: 16 hp

Adami was an automobile manufactured in Florence, Italy.

== History ==
Guido Adami was a race driver who started a repair shop, and moved to building cars in 1900. They produced a single model, the Rondine, with a 16 hp engine developed in house. It was first displayed at the Turin Motor Show of 1902. Production ended in 1906.
