= Lancia Florida =

Series of concept cars designed by Pinin Farina in collaboration with Lancia

Lancia Florida is the name of two studies based on the Lancia Aurelia, which were built by Lancia in collaboration with Pinin Farina. Both were made in extremely small numbers. They are both considered to be masterpieces of Italian automotive design and had much influence on automotive design. From them were later derived the sedan and the coupe versions of the Lancia Flaminia.

== Florida I ==
Lancia Florida I
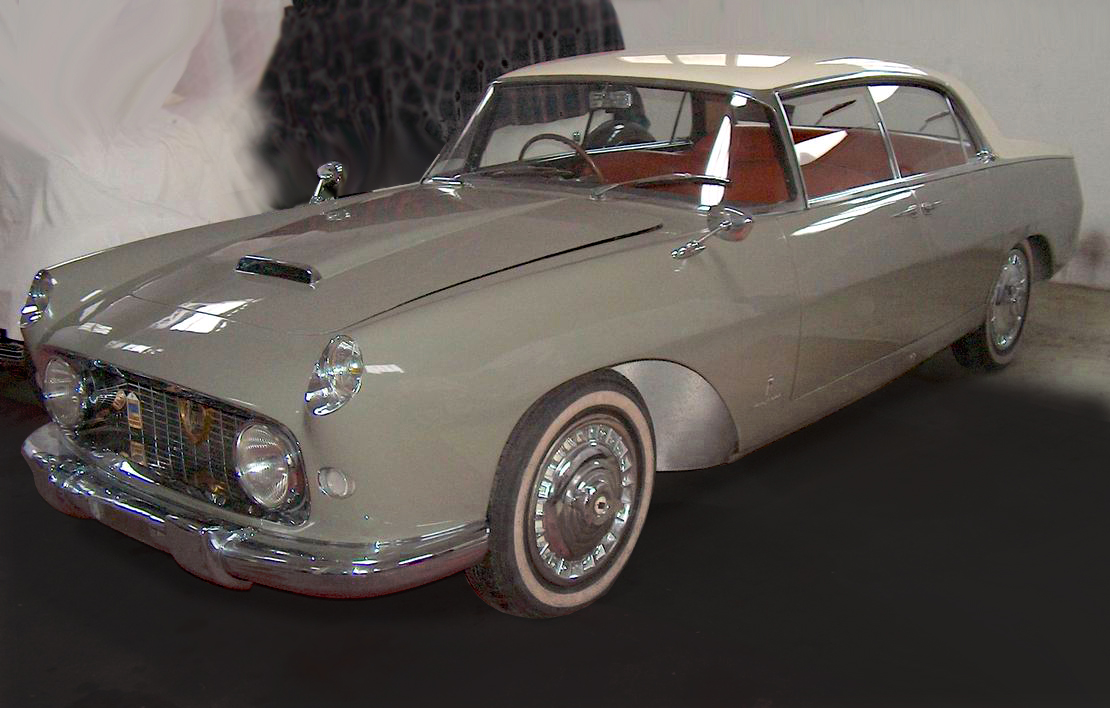
- Lancia Florida I Sedan

Overview
- Manufacturer: Lancia
- Also called: Lancia Aurelia Florida
- Production: 1955; 4 built (3 sedans, 1 coupe)
- Designer: Battista Farina of Pinin Farina

Body and chassis
- Body style: 2-door pillarless coupé 4-door pillarless sedan
- Layout: FR layout
- Related: Lancia Aurelia

Chronology
- Successor: Lancia Florida II

The Florida I was built in 1955, with the first car, a coupe, being completed in September of that year. It was first shown at that year's Turin Auto Show. The Florida I is mostly known for the 4-door Berlina model, but a coupe model was also made; It was one of the first cars to carry the Lancia logo. The sedan has rear suicide doors, according to Lancia tradition, and no B pillar, as well as many notable design elements such as flat sides with a single crease running right above the wheelwell, headlights mounted in the grille, an inset rear windshield and flying buttresses. A total of four cars were built, three of which were 4-door Berlinas and one of which was a 2-door coupe.

For the production of the first prototype at Pinin Farina, 10 of 340 employees of the company were employed (presumably under the direction of Francesco Martinengo). On April 2, 1955, Antonio Fessia became the new technical director of Lancia, initiating further changes to the car. The V6 engine was a development of Francesco de Virgilio. The Florida initially had a conventional rigid DeDion rear axle.

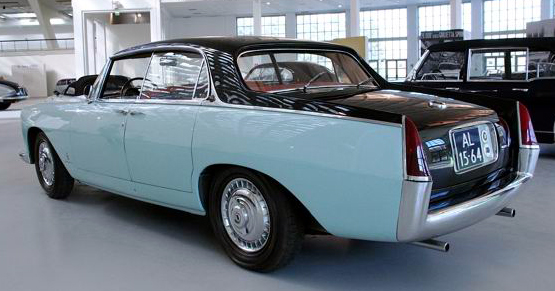
Lancia Florida I Berlina (sedan) rear view

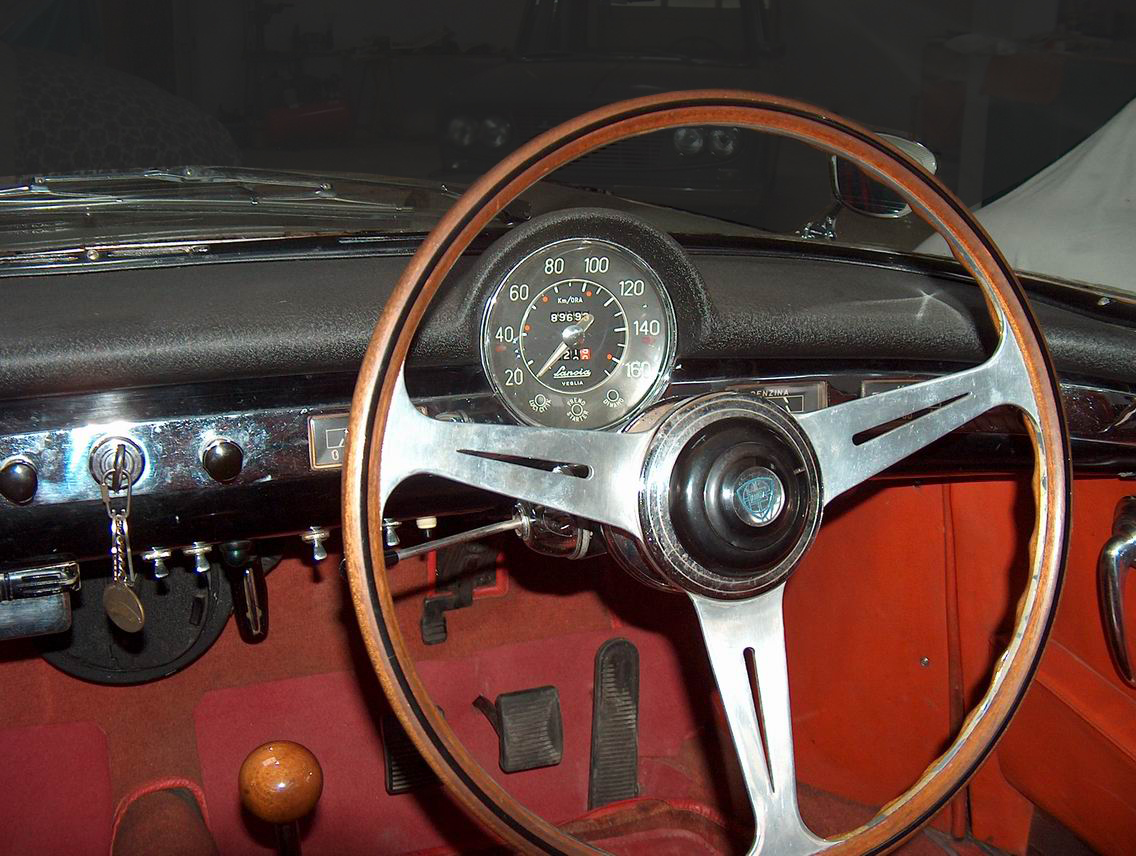
Cockpit

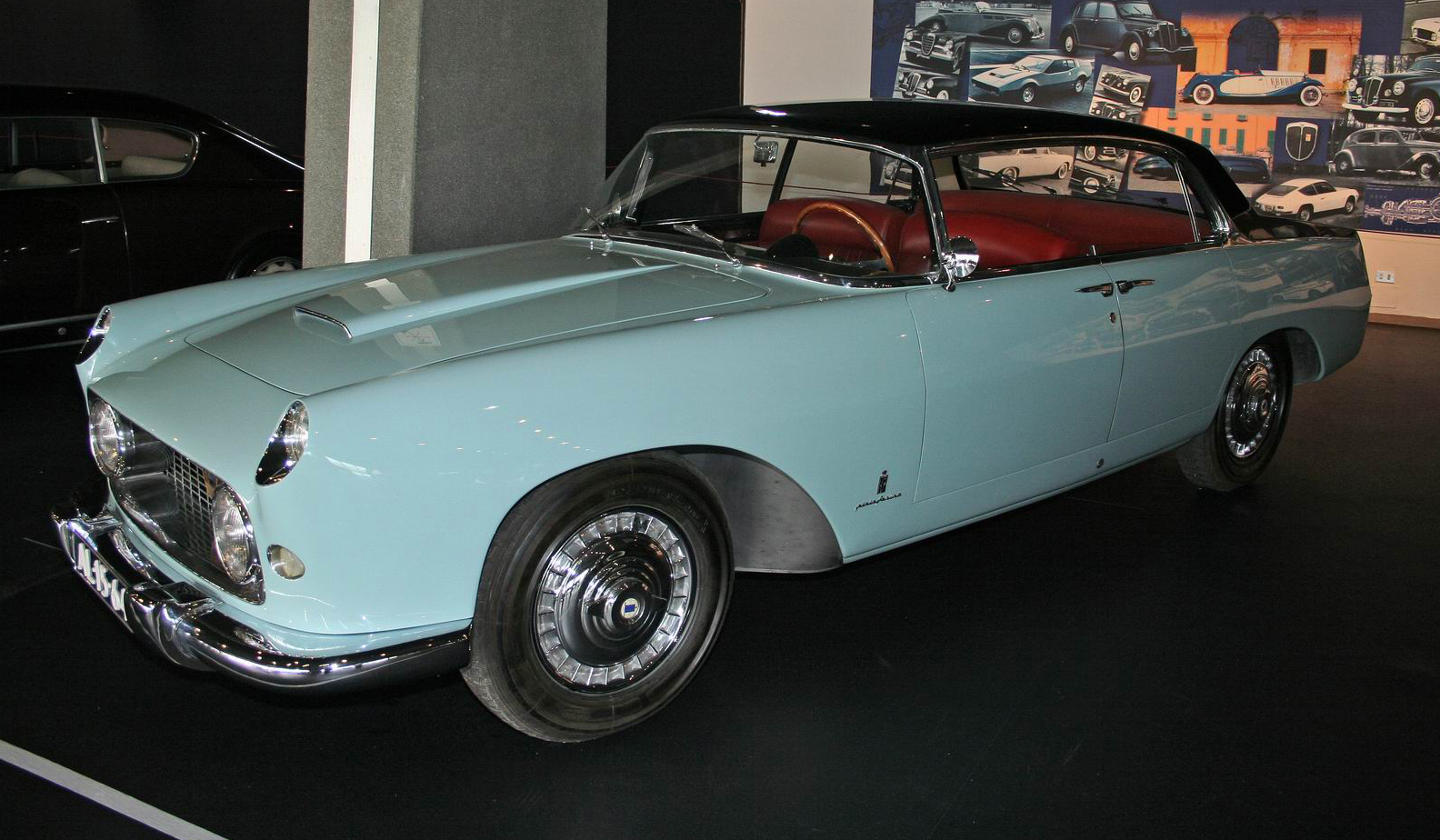
Lancia Florida I Berlina (sedan)

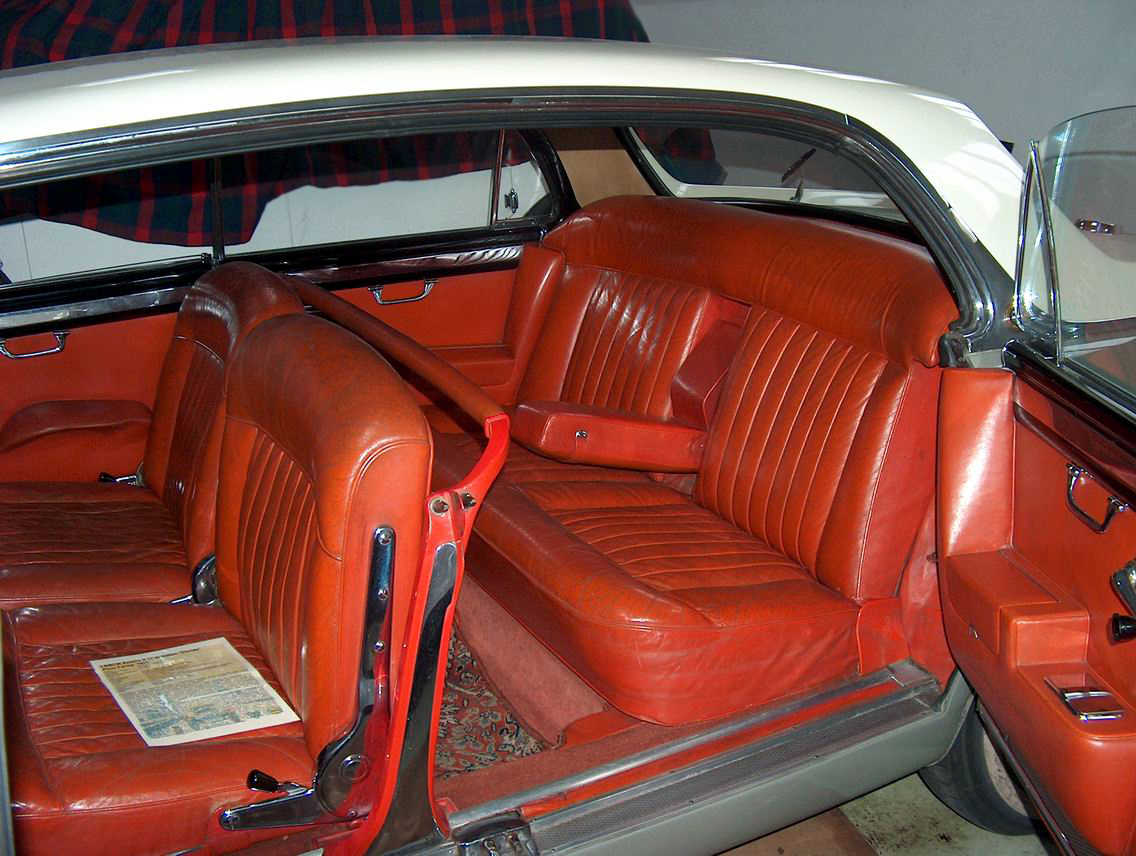
Florida I Berlina (sedan) Interior with both doors open

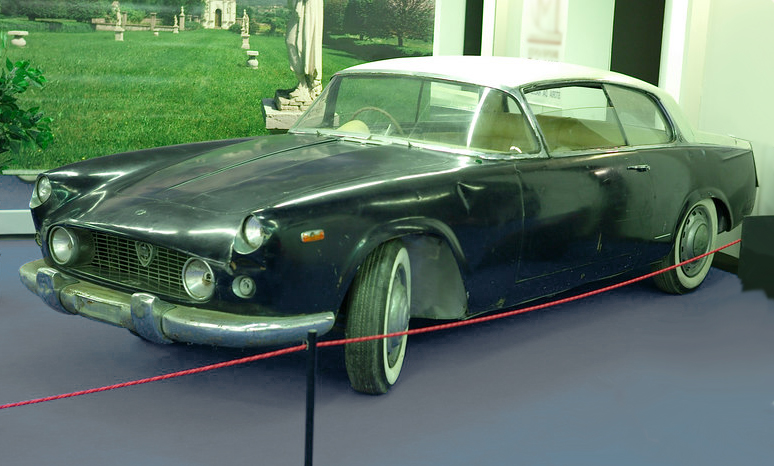
Lancia Florida I coupe

== Florida II ==
Lancia Florida II
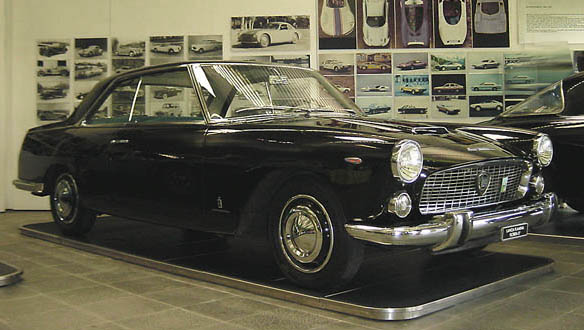
- Lancia Florida II

Overview
- Manufacturer: Lancia
- Production: 1957
- Designer: Pinin Farina

Body and chassis
- Body style: 2-door pillarless coupé 4-door pillarless hardtop
- Layout: FR layout

Powertrain
- Engine: 2.3 L V6

Chronology
- Successor: Lancia Flaminia Coupé

The Florida II was introduced in 1957. In its current, surviving form, it is a four-door hardtop that uses rear-hinged rear doors with no pillar separating them, meaning the windows are pillarless with no B pillar. Because of this design, the front door latches onto the rear door, while the rear door latches onto a striker plate on the sill of the car. This design would later be used on cars such as the Mazda RX-8 and Toyota FJ Cruiser. Its V6 engine has a displacement of 2,266 cm 3 and makes 87 hp (64 kW) at 4,800 rpm.

Sources disagree on whether one or two Florida II prototypes were built. Period photographs appear to show both a 4-door hardtop sedan and 2-door hardtop coupe version of the Florida II, with the latter distinguished by the lack of orange sidemarkers on the fenders and the placement of the Pininfarina badges by the rear wheels rather than the front. Some sources claim this is a separate car, while others say the car originally had 2-doors upon introduction and was later converted into a 4-door.

The Florida II was a personal favorite of Pinin Farina founder, Battista Farina and he regularly used it until his death in April 1966. He also said about it that it was "the only one to go to heaven".

The production version of the Lancia Flaminia Coupe was similar to the Florida II, sharing many of its key design elements, but had a B-pillar and was significantly shorter. The Flaminia coupe also adopted a steeper windshield rake, framed door glass, door vent windows, and a bigger air scoop at the request of Lancia. The Florida II is regarded as a very important design, with many saying its angular styling helped pave the way for 1960s car design as a whole. Mercedes designer Bruno Sacco once described the Florida II as one of the cars he would have liked to design. The principles of the suicide doors and the lack of a B-pillar were used again in the Lancia Dialogos study in 1997.
