= Triumph Italia =

British-Italian sportscar (1959–1962)

Triumph Italia 2000
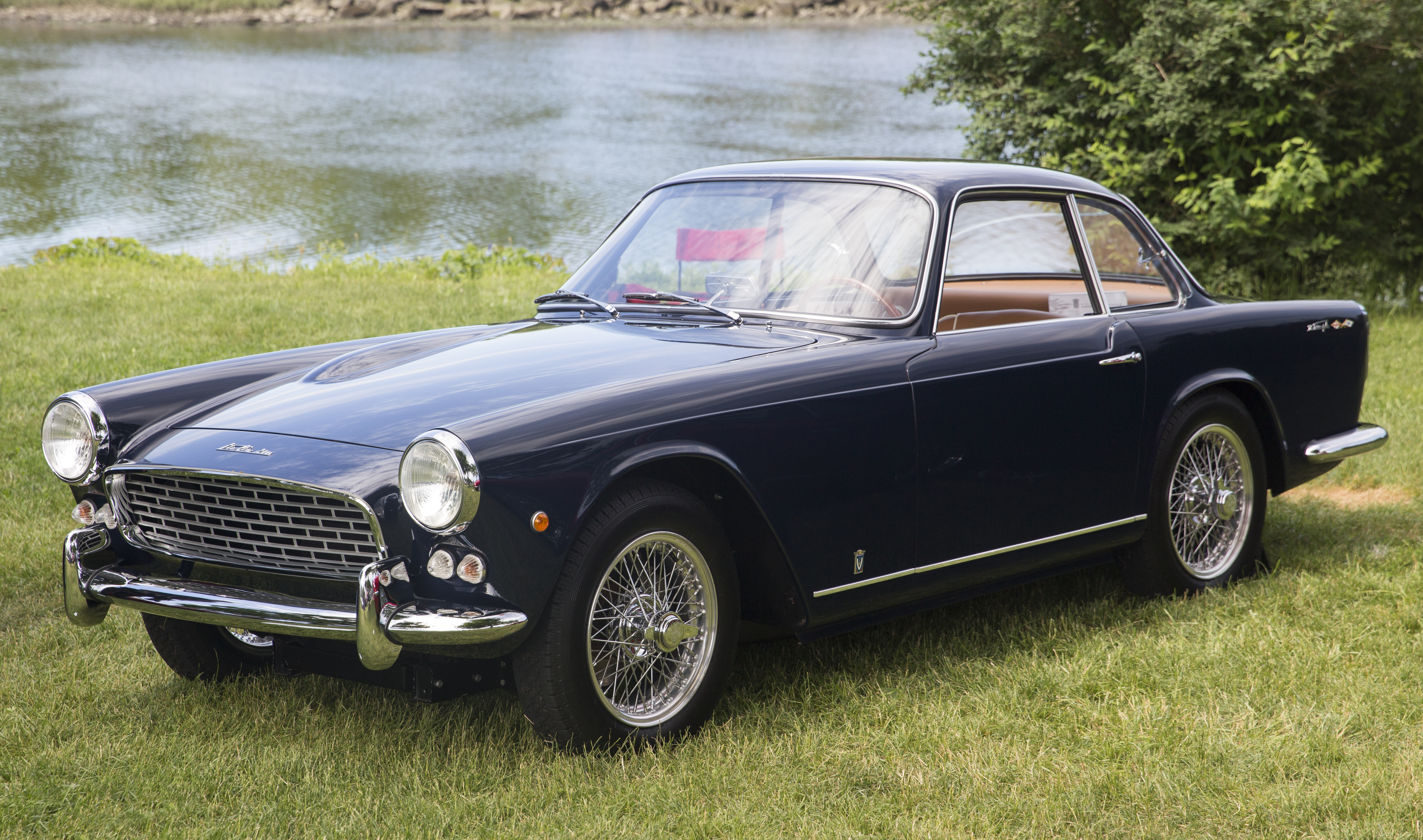

Overview
- Manufacturer: Ruffino S.p.A.
- Also called: Ruffino Italia 2000
- Production: 1959–1962; 330 made
- Assembly: Turin, Italy
- Designer: Giovanni Michelotti

Body and chassis
- Class: Sports car
- Body style: 2-door coupé
- Layout: FR
- Related: Triumph TR3

Powertrain
- Engine: 1,991 cc (121 cu in) I4
- Transmission: 4-speed manual with reverse

Chronology
- Predecessor: none
- Successor: none

The Triumph Italia 2000 Coupé was built between 1959 and 1962, during which time 330 cars were produced. Designed by Giovanni Michelotti, the TR3 chassis and mechanical components were supplied by the Triumph Motor Company in the United Kingdom, and built in Turin, Italy.

== History ==
Designed by Giovanni Michelotti and built at a facility owned by Carrozzeria Vignale in Turin, under contract to Ruffino S.p.A. Industria Costruzione Automobile of Naples, the car was expected to appeal to people wanting the dependability and readily available stock of mechanical parts of a Triumph, but who were willing to spend more for a better looking car than the current TR3. Advertising copy proclaimed it "Italian bodywork at its best, British tradition in sports car engineering at its finest."

At the time, Salvatore Ruffino was the owner of CESAC, the Italian company that distributed Standard-Triumph in Italy. He approached Standard-Triumph to supply chassis and mechanical components to build 1,000 cars. Ruffino approached a number of carrozzeria, including Zagato. He had not found a design that was to his liking and was later introduced to the young, Giovanni Michelotti. It was this introduction that was to lead to the Triumph Italia. The resulting two door coupé, now referred to as the "slope-nosed prototype," was well received at the 1958 Turin Motor Show – "Italian artistry and British craftsmanship have come together and produced this new, superlative Italia 2000 Coupé." A second prototype was built with a revised nose and rear roof line. The change was necessary after road tests with the first prototype highlighted some handling issues. This second prototype was much closer to the final "look" of the Italia. The first prototype was converted into another car, quite possibly the second prototype. This second car still survives. The 1959 Turin show featured another early car (probably Italia #3) on the Triumph stand and, by all accounts, the motoring press was impressed. The first two "show" cars were Italia #1 which was delivered to Standard-Triumph for testing and Italia #2 which was reputedly Ruffino's personal car. These early show cars had many small differences from the later "production" run. The first 13 cars were assembled completely by Vignale. These cars have a number of different badges but not all appeared on all of these "show" cars. On the nose was a large "V" (for Vignale) badge, a "by G. Michelotti" badge on the bonnet, small "Vignale" scripts and a cloisonné Vignale-badge on the front wings, "Triumph Italia" on the rear wings with a set of Vignale crossed-flags (these are very similar to the ones on the Standard-Triumph Vignale Vanguard, they are nautical flags for "V" and "S," the "S" presumably for Standard-Triumph), a large Vignale script on the boot handle and a "Triumph 2000" script on the boot. After the first 13, Ruffino took over production on an assembly line he leased from Vignale for the remainder of production.

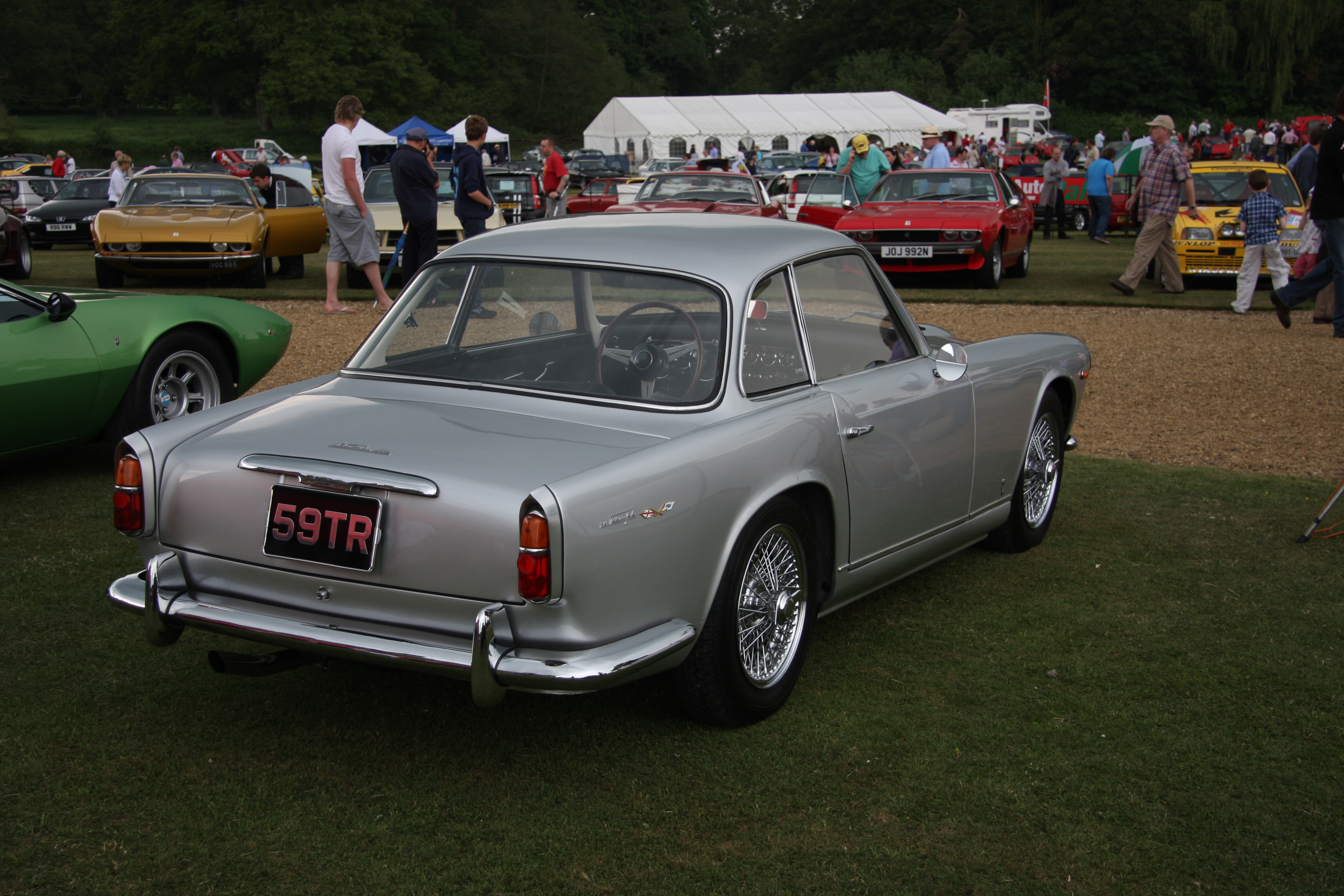
Rear view

Ruffino began full production in December 1959 with only a few changes from the Vignale-built "show" cars. The most noticeable differences include the badging. The car was no longer billed as the "Triumph Italia" and was now referred to as the "Italia 2000." Other than a cloisonné Vignale-badge on the front wings and crossed-flags on the rear wings, all other references to Vignale were removed. The only reference to Triumph were the "T.M. Triumph" badges on the rear wings. Subsequent investigation points to the "T.M." representing the Italian (Telaio e Motore) for "Chassis and Engine." Perhaps the easiest method to identify a "production" Italia is the use of side marker lights on the front wings. While aluminum was used for a few internal panels, all Italias used steel for the bodywork.

Each Italia has a small badge located near the bonnet catch, identifying its place in production. For the production series, this badge was riveted in place. If this badge is missing, the number can be found stamped on other parts of the car or written on the backs of the interior panels. In the case of a missing badge, it is important for owners to check in multiple places for numbers as occasionally parts from cars being assembled at the same time were interchanged with others. Cars in the 1XX, 2XX or 3XX series may only have the last two digits of their numbers stamped on subsequent parts. Chassis were not used consecutively and this can make it difficult to identify a car if the Standard-Triumph chassis plate is missing. If the original engine is still in place, the chassis number can be found from this. It would be almost impossible for a TR series car to have an engine and chassis number that are the same, as engines were pulled from the assembly line to supply other manufacturers including Morgan, Peerless and even Ajax Marine engines.

Ruffino envisioned building 1,000 cars, between 1960 and 1962, with worldwide distribution including the American marketplace. He had a verbal agreement to have every Triumph dealer (720) purchase an Italia. The Italia never became an official model of Standard-Triumph but is represented in the Standard-Triumph records with a specification list and part numbers for modified parts shipped to Ruffino with the chassis.

Facing ongoing financial and labor problems, Standard-Triumph was taken over by Leyland Motors in 1961. Perhaps fearing increased competition, the new management did not honour the verbal contract that Ruffino had made with Triumph, and instead concentrated their efforts on the new TR4. Also a Michelotti design, it clearly borrowed elements from the Italia, including the distinctive bonnet bulge, kick-up door with wind-up windows, and roomier, more modern body design. The TR4 was released in 1962.

When Triumph decided not to distribute the Italia, Ruffino S.p.A. re-badged the car as the Italia 2000 and continued production. Over a three-year production period (mid-1959 to mid-1962) Vignale produced 330 cars — 2 prototypes and 328 numbered production cars. Six cars were produced in right-hand drive. The first show car, Italia #1, was converted to right-hand drive after being sold by Standard-Triumph. After a six-month halt in production, the last run of 29 cars was based on the TR3B chassis. These all used the TSF chassis specification and so retained the 1991 cc engine and non-synchro first gear transmission of the TR3.

The first brochure from Ruffino listed these options: adjustable steering, overdrive (this was indicated by an extra "O" at the end of the chassis number), leather interior (rare), white wall tires, Dunlop High Speed tires (early cars were supplied with Michelin radials as standard), Competition Rear Shocks, Competition Front Springs, Aluminum Sump, and Radio. Later brochures show fewer option choices: overdrive, steel disc wheels, leather interior, white wall tires and adjustable steering. Period photos show Borrani wire wheels only on the second prototype along with a Nardi wood steering wheel. A few cars had a Nardi wheel which may have been installed from new.

Italia sales in America were handled by Stutz Plaisted Imports (Salem, Massachusetts). Even though production came to a close in 1962, the last 29 cars sat in Italy until 1964. When Ruffino relinquished his Standard-Triumph distributorship, Triumph shipped these last cars to the U.S. Some were used at Standard-Triumph's office in New York, and others were sold through various dealers, the last few being sold in 1965. Slow sales can be attributed to the expensive $5,000 price tag (a $1,000 premium over the TR3). Body parts were not stocked outside Italy and buyers were required to sign a release form of acknowledgment. Starting in late 1961, cars were also distributed by Inter National Motors of Los Angeles with a considerably lower $3995 price tag.
