= EuAuto Technology =

- Industry: Automotive
- Founded
- Defunct: 24 May 2010
- Fate: Acquired by GreenTech Automotive (GTA)
- Headquarters: Hong Kong, China
- Key people: Sinling Chung (Chief Executive)
- Products: Electric cars
- Parent: GreenTech Automotive

EuAuto Technology Limited was a company in Hong Kong that developed the MyCar electric automobile. The company specialized in "design, develop, manufacture and sales of environmentally friendly vehicles for global markets."

On 24 May 2010, GreenTech Automotive (GTA) acquired EuAuto Technology. GreenTech Automotive relocated the company's operations and manufacturing to the United States. GreenTech Automotive's first manufacturing facility was temporarily in Horn Lake, Mississippi. GreenTech Automotive declined an Associated Press request to tour the Horn Lake manufacturing facility. GreenTech produced few cars, if any. GreenTech declared bankruptcy in February 2018.

== Models ==
=== MyCar ===
The MyCar was styled by Giorgetto Giugiaro of Italdesign. The propulsion system was engineered in co-operation with Hong Kong Polytechnic University.
