= Maserati Bora =

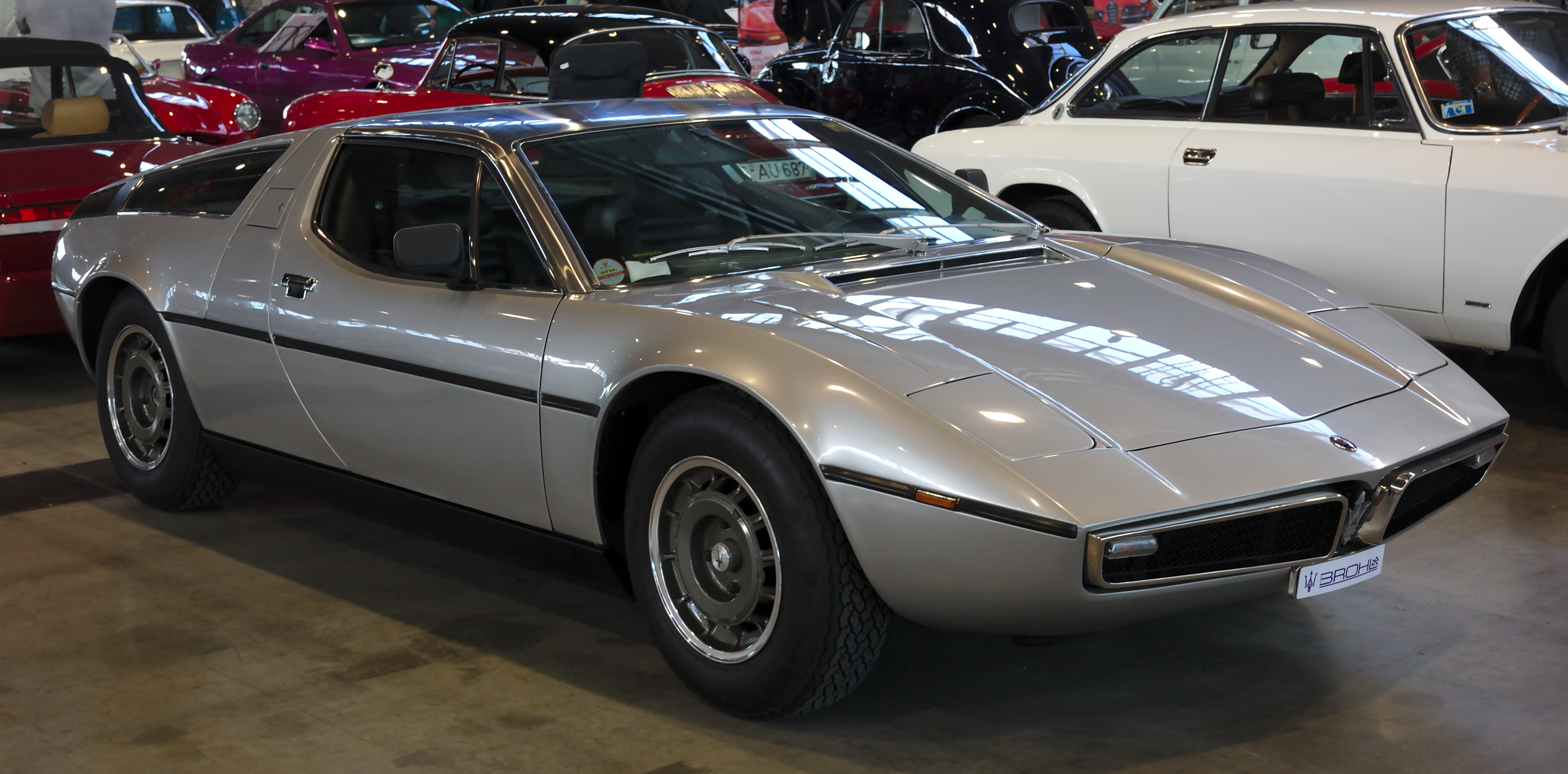

Overview
- Manufacturer: Maserati
- Production: 1971–1978 (Bora 4.7 L) (289 produced); 1973–1978 (Bora 4.9 L) (275 produced); 564 produced (total)
- Assembly: Italy: Modena
- Designer: Giorgetto Giugiaro at Italdesign

Body and chassis
- Class: Sports car
- Body style: 2-door coupé
- Layout: Longitudinal Rear mid-engine, rear-wheel drive
- Related: Maserati Merak

Powertrain
- Engine: 4719 cc Tipo AM 107.07 V8; 4930 cc Tipo AM 107.16 V8
- Transmission: 5-speed ZF manual

Dimensions
- Wheelbase: 2,600 mm (102.4 in)
- Length: 4,335 mm (170.7 in)
- Width: 1,768 mm (69.6 in)
- Height: 1,134 mm (44.6 in)
- Curb weight: 1,535 kg (3,384 lb)

The Maserati Bora (Tipo AM117) is a two-seat, rear mid-engine, rear-wheel drive sports car and grand tourer, manufactured by Maserati from 1971 to 1978. In common with other Maserati cars of the era, it is named after a wind, Bora being the wind of Trieste. The Bora was the company's first mid-engined street car and ended Maserati's reputation for producing fast but technologically out of date cars, also being the first Maserati with four wheel independent suspension. In contrast, competitor Lamborghini had first used full independent suspension in 1964.

== History ==
Shortly after Citroën took a controlling interest in Maserati in 1968, the concept of a mid-engined two-seat sports car was proposed. Lamborghini and De Tomaso already had the Miura and Mangusta, whilst Ferrari were known to be developing their own mid-engined contender. Initially known as Tipo 117 and later the Bora, the Maserati project got underway in October 1968 and a prototype was on the road by mid-1969. Shown in its final form at the Geneva Salon in March 1971, deliveries began before the end of the year. Maserati struggled after being bought by De Tomaso in 1975, and the Bora was discontinued during 1978. 564 Boras were produced in total, of which 275 were fitted with 4.9-litre engines and the other 289 were fitted with 4.7-litre engines.

The first Boras were delivered to customers in late 1971, and only minor production changes were gradually phased in thereafter. About early 1974, front lids became hinged at front instead of rear, pop-up headlights showed rounded inside corners, and a rectangular black air-exit grille was added across the hood (similar to Pantera). Production ran from 1971 to 1978, with 564 cars built, 289 of which were 4.7s and the remaining 275 being 4.9s.

The Bora provided the basis for the Merak, which used the same bodyshell front clip but in a 2+2 configuration, made possible by using a smaller, lighter and less powerful Maserati V6 engine, also used in the Citroën SM. The Merak was popular, including the later modified and improved Merak SS which made its debut in 1981. Merak models had an opened rear engine-cover instead of the glass-enclosed and heavier cover of the Bora.

Maserati developed two Group 4 racing cars at the request of Thepenier, a French Maserati dealer. They were tuned to produce 430 PS (316 kW; 424 hp) and were fully competitive, but Maserati couldn't produce enough cars to meet the 500 road car homologation rule for Group 4 racing so the project was shelved.

== Design and innovations ==
The Bora was designed by Giorgetto Giugiaro at Italdesign in the late 1960s, and came to market in 1971, sporting a drag coefficient of just 0.30, a value that would still be called very aerodynamic, a decade later. Fabrication of the all-steel panels was contracted to Officine Padane of Modena.

The Bora had a number of innovative features that distinguished the car both from previous Maseratis, as well as other leading brand supercars. Compared to those, it was civilized and practical, featuring a hydraulically powered pedal cluster that could be moved forward and backwards at the touch of a button and a steering wheel that could be tilted as well as telescoped, addressing the familiar problem of entering and exiting the vehicle typical of many supercars.

Most supercars offer little foot room and little to no provision for luggage, but the Bora has a full-size trunk in the front of the vehicle, and was otherwise known as being much more civilized in comforts from its competitors. Unlike its competitors, the Bora used dual-pane insulative glazing separating its cabin from the engine compartment, as well as a carpeted aluminium engine cap, greatly decreasing the powertrain's transmission of noise, harshness and vibration to the cabin, and increasing the comfort level for the driver. The engine and five-speed ZF transaxle were mounted on a subframe attached to the floor pan via four flexible mounts, which also helped the ride quality.

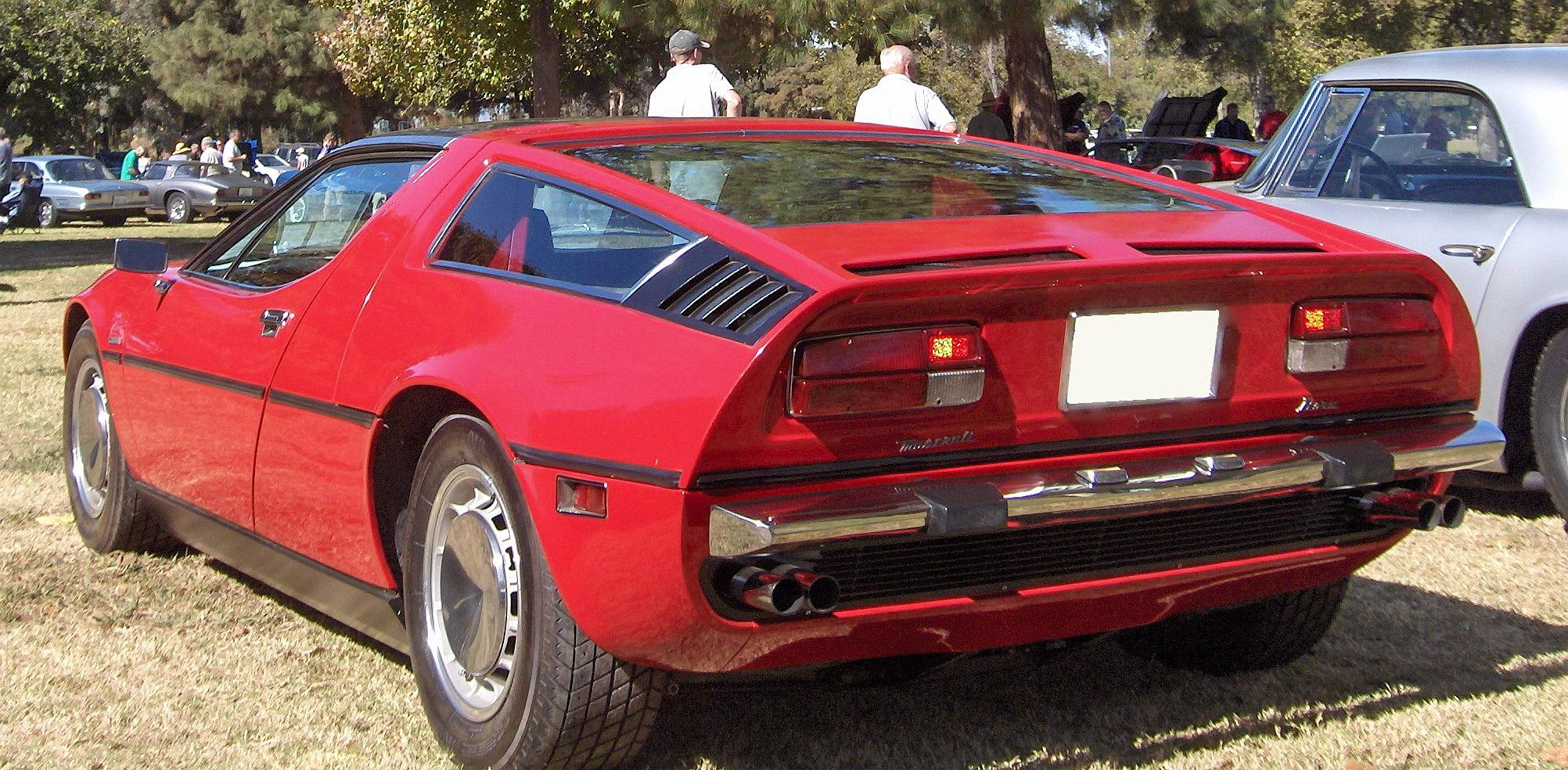
Rear view

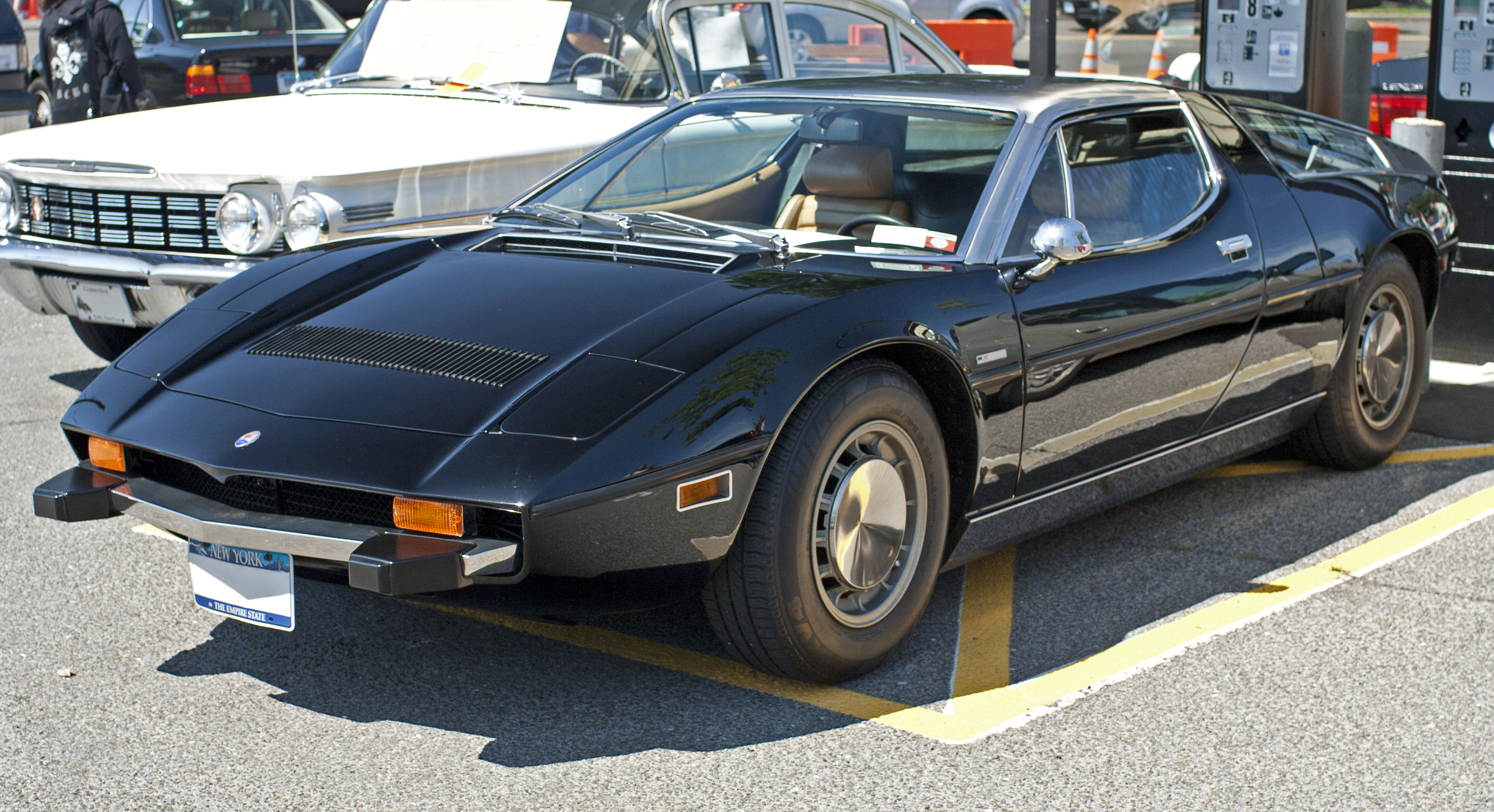
US-spec 1974 Maserati Bora

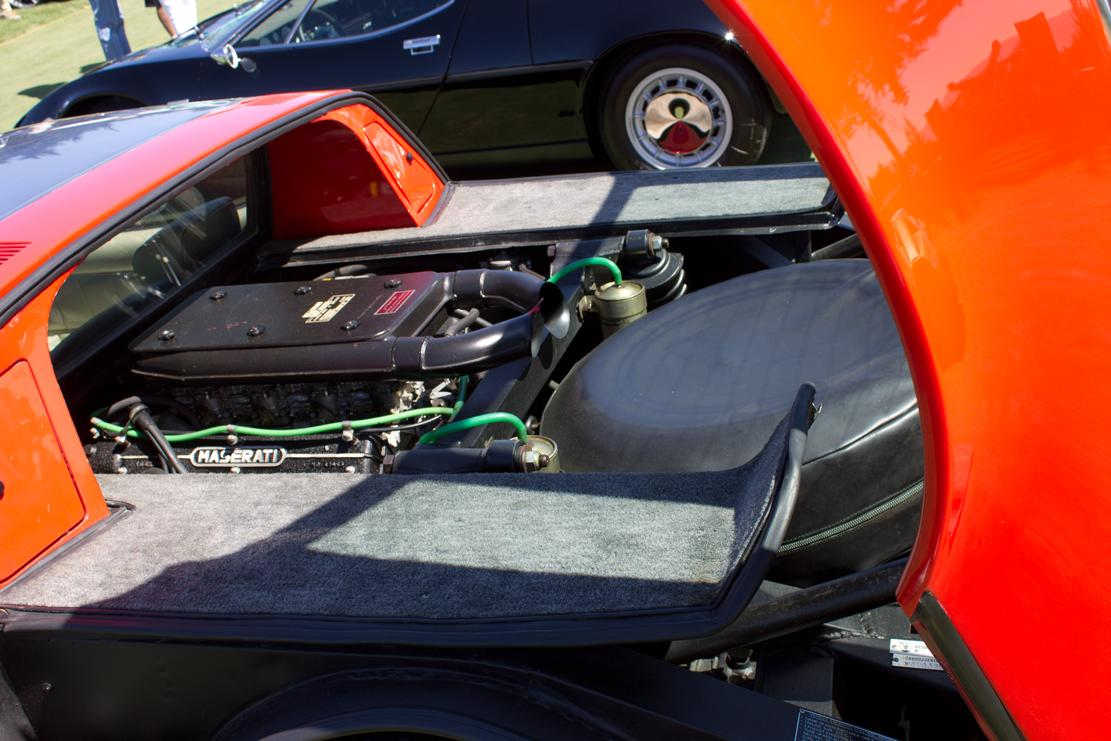
Engine

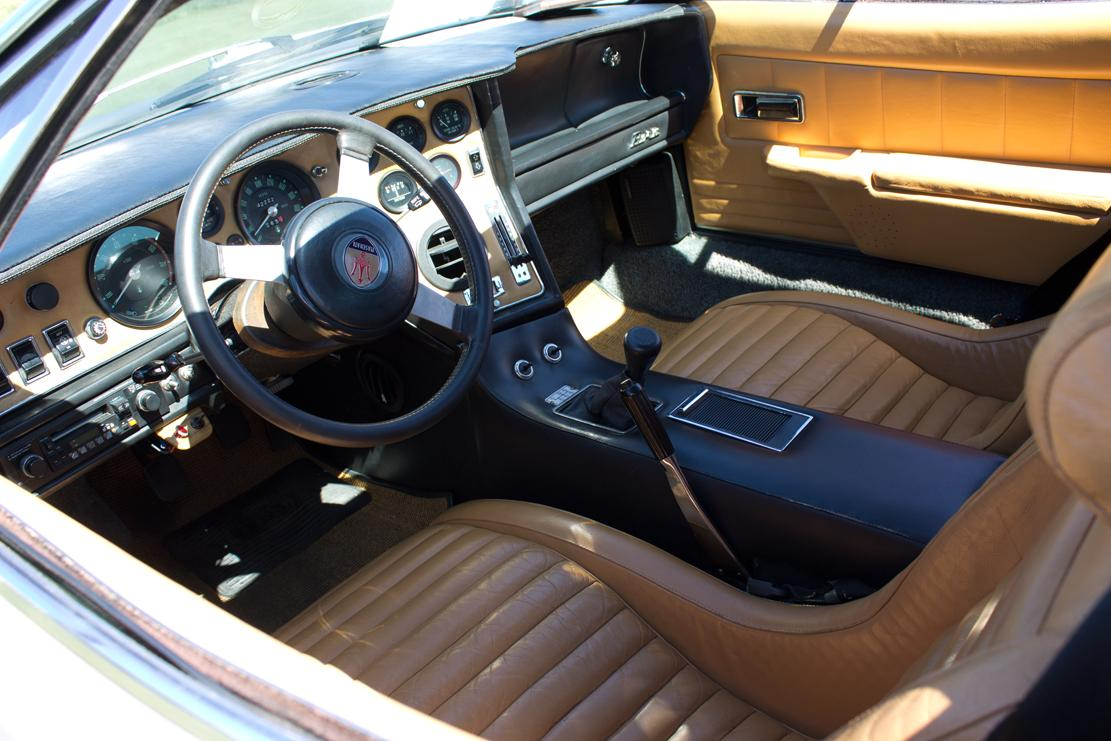
Interior

== Specifications ==
The original engine is a high-revving 4,719 cc (4.7 L; 288.0 cu in) producing 310 PS (228 kW; 306 hp) at 6,000 rpm and 461 N⋅m (340 lb⋅ft) of torque at 4,200 rpm. The US-bound Bora had larger 4.9-litre engine from the Ghibli as to compensate for the reduced power due to the exhaust emission regulations. In 1976, Maserati switched to the larger 4.9-litre engine with a 8.75 to 1 compression ratio, rated at 330 PS (243 kW; 325 hp) at 5,500 rpm and 481 N⋅m (354 lb⋅ft) at 4,000 rpm for markets outside of the United States. Both engines trace their lineage back to the famous 450S racecar, were made of aluminium alloy and had hemispherical combustion chambers with 16 valves total operated by four cams (chain-driven). Both engines were mounted longitudinally in the middle of the car and were mated to a ZF-1 five-speed transaxle sending power to the rear wheels. They were fed by four 42 DCNF/14 downdraught Weber carburetors with Bosch electronic ignition. The compression ratio is 8.5:1.

The most distinctive details of the Bora were the brushed stainless steel roof and windscreen pillars. Inside, the bucket seats, dash, door trim, centre console and rear bulkhead were trimmed in leather, with electric windows and air conditioning as standard. The steering column was manually adjustable for rake and reach. The auxiliary hydraulic circuit system controls adjusted the driver's seat vertically, the pedal box (consisting of the brake, clutch and throttle pedals) can be set horizontally forwards and backwards by around 76 mm (3.0 in) – a first such application in the world for a production car, and also to raise and lower the concealed headlights in the front fenders.

=== US models ===
The larger 4.9-litre V8 engine from the US-bound Ghibli produced 280 hp (209 kW; 284 PS) at 6,000 rpm and 339 lb⋅ft (460 N⋅m) of torque at 4,200 rpm. From 1973 on, the engine was fitted with air pump as to decrease the exhaust emissions, and its output was increased to 300 hp (224 kW; 304 PS) at 6,000 rpm.

Larger, beefier bumpers were fitted to the US-bound cars as to comply with bumper standards, though many Bora owners in the United States and Canada have subsequently replaced them with the smaller, thinner bumpers for European and international markets.

The colour of turn signal indicators on the taillamps was changed from amber to red for the US and Canadian market.

=== Chassis ===
The original estimated weight was 1,400 kg (3,100 lb), however, noise and safety concerns increased the weight to 1,535 kg (3,384 lb). It is popularly believed that the Bora is heavier than the Ghibli; however, the Ghibli weighs 1,650 kg (3,640 lb), some 115 kg (254 lb) more than the Bora. The reason for this misconception probably stems from the state of tune of their respective engines as well as the difference in the gearing of the two cars.

A combined steel monocoque chassis and body featured a tubular steel subframe at the back for the engine and transmission. Bora also featured four-wheel independent suspension (a first for a Maserati passenger car) with coil springs, telescopic suspension dampers, and anti-roll bars. The development prototype and the similar show car first seen at the 1971 Geneva Motor Show featured the front suspension using MacPherson struts, but this was abandoned for the production version due to the severe drivability issue. Using MacPherson struts in combination with very wide front tyres and rack-and-pinion steering system produced stronger and undesirable kickback. For the production cars, Maserati reverted to a conventional wishbone arrangement for the front suspension.

Citroën's advanced high-pressure LHM hydraulic technology was adapted into two circuit systems: main and auxiliary. The main controls the ventilated disc brakes while the auxiliary operates the horizontal and vertical movements of the pedal box (clutch, brake, and throttle), the vertical adjustments of the driver's seat, and the raising and lowering of the retractable headlights. Wheels were 7.5 in × 15 in (190.5 mm × 381.0 mm) Campagnolo light alloy type with distinctive removable polished stainless steel hubcaps in the earlier models. Tyres were Michelin XWX 205x70 front and rear, however these early cars exhibited problems with "tramlining" at speed. To solve this problem Maserati fitted later cars with 215/70VR15 tyres on the rear, with the choice of Michelin XWX or Pirelli Cinturato CN12 tyres.

The official Maserati website quotes a top speed of 270 km/h (168 mph) for the Bora 4.7 and 285 km/h (177 mph) for the Bora 4.9, although many sources give differing top speeds.

== See also ==
- List of Maserati vehicles
- Maserati brothers
