= Plastech Engineered Products =

Automotive parts supplier

- Type: Private
- Industry: Automotive Supply
- Founded: 1988
- Headquarters: Dearborn, Michigan; manufacturing facilities in 9 U.S. states
- Key people: Julie Brown CEO
- Products: Automobile Components and systems
- Number of employees: 7600
- Website: http://plastecheng.com/

Plastech Engineered Products was a tier-1 automobile supplier headquartered in Dearborn, Michigan. It was long the largest woman-owned company in the state of Michigan. Plastech started in 1988 with the purchase of a single injection molding facility in Caro, Michigan. The company subsequently grew rapidly through a mixture of organic growth and acquisitions, the most notable of the latter being the purchase of United Screw and Bolt in 1997 and LDM Technologies in 2004. In 2007 Plastech took over four plants and sales of US$700 million from Johnson Controls, bringing annual sales to US$1.7 billion. Plastech's customers included General Motors, Ford Motor Company, Chrysler, and Johnson Controls.

Following a disagreement with Chrysler, Plastech Engineered Products filed for Chapter 11 bankruptcy protection on February 1, 2008. Douglas Doran, Chrysler's director of interior procurement, said Plastech's quality issues were far worse than the typical supplier. He stated that those quality issues, coupled with Plastech's continued financial needs, led Chrysler to cancel its contracts. The firm was having trouble paying suppliers and had violated agreements with its lenders. General Motors, Ford, and Johnson Controls all publicly supported Chrysler's position against Plastech. The firm was later liquidated, with major assets being sold to Johnson Controls. Both Chrysler and General Motors would themselves file for bankruptcy in 2009, thereafter receiving large government-backed loans that were later completely paid back in full.

In 2014, Plastech Holding Corp. was involved in litigation in the Eastern District of Michigan with GreenTech Automotive. Plastech said that GreenTech intentionally interfered with Plastech's relationship with Chinese carmaker JAC Motors, and that GreenTech CEO Charlie Wang had met with Plastech about serving as the middleman in Plastech's deal, and "knew perfectly well that we had an agreement and interfered with it."

In 2014 JCI spun off its automotive interiors business, and several former Plastech locations are now operated by Yanfeng Automotive Interiors.

Plastech Engineered Products is the namesake of Brown University's Plastech Professor of Computer Science, an endowed professorship currently held by Roberto Tamassia.

Private investment company Oak Point Partners acquired the remnant assets, consisting of any known and unknown assets that weren't previously administered, from the Liquidating Trust for the Plastech Engineered Products, Inc., et al., Bankruptcy Estates on October 19, 2017.

== Locations ==
Plastech employed 7,600 people in 31 manufacturing facilities, 2 corporate locations and a Technical Center North America:

Alabama

- McCalla, AL

Illinois

- Chicago

Indiana

- Elwood, IN
- Kendallville, IN

Kentucky

- Louisville, KY x2
- Owensboro, Kentucky

Louisiana

- Shreveport, LA closed due to bankruptcy

Michigan

- Auburn Hills, MI (Corp.)
- Auburn Hills, MI (Tech. Center)
- Caro, MI
- Clarkston, MI
- Croswell, MI
- Dearborn, MI (Corp.)
- Fowlerville, MI
- Grandville, MI
- Hartland, MI
- Kentwood, MI x2
- Lansing, MI
- Monroe, MI x2
- Port Huron, MI
- Romulus, MI x2

Ohio

- Andover, OH
- Brooklyn, OH
- Bryan, OH
- Byesville, OHClosed/ More than 450 jobs lost
- Cleveland, OH
- Moraine, OH
- Strongsville, OH
- Wauseon, OH

Tennessee

- Franklin, TN closed August 2008
- Kenton, TN closed due to bankruptcy
Workmen dismantling plastic injection molding machines to be sold as scrap metal at the closed Plastech plant in Franklin, TN; June 2009

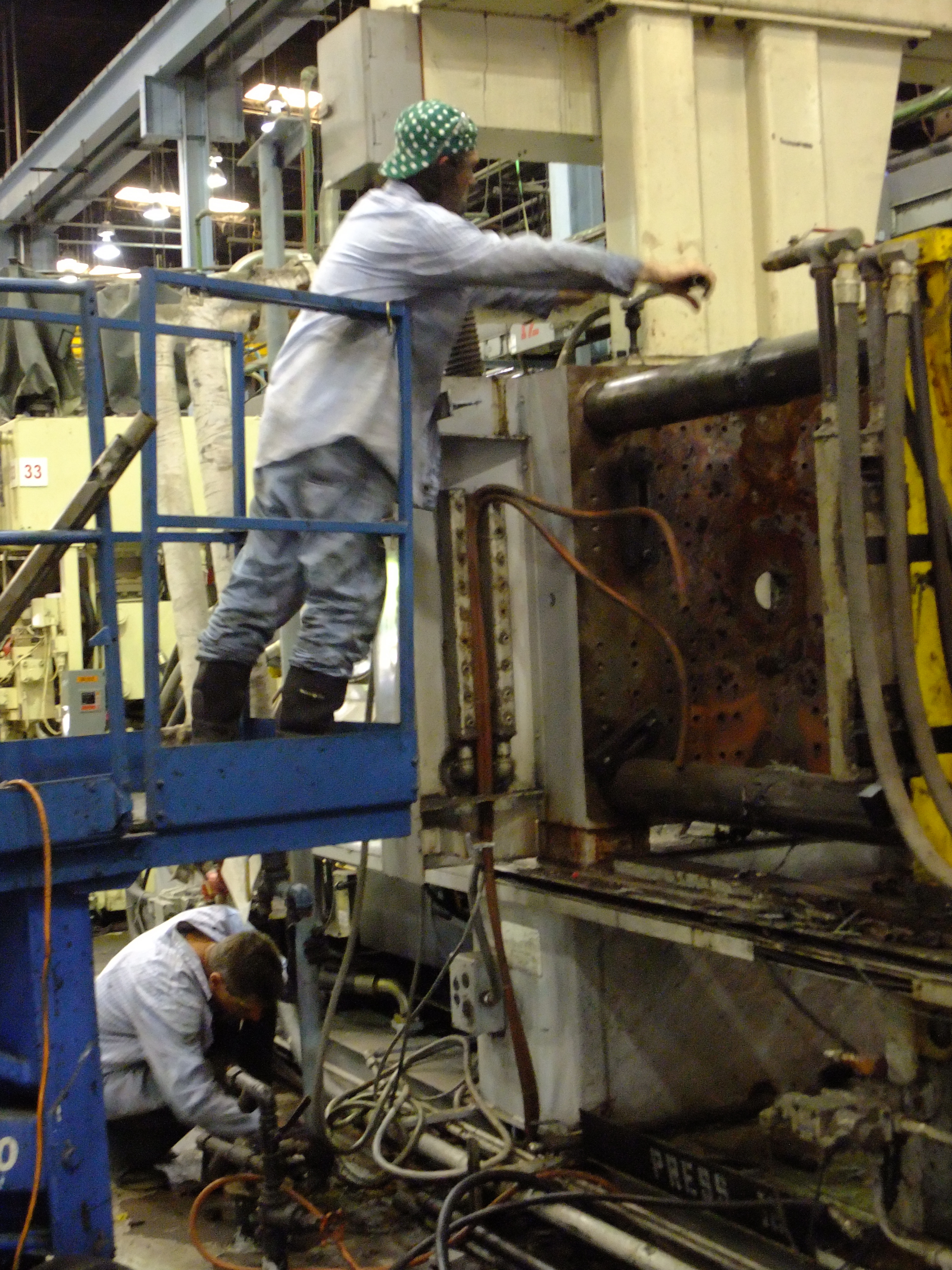

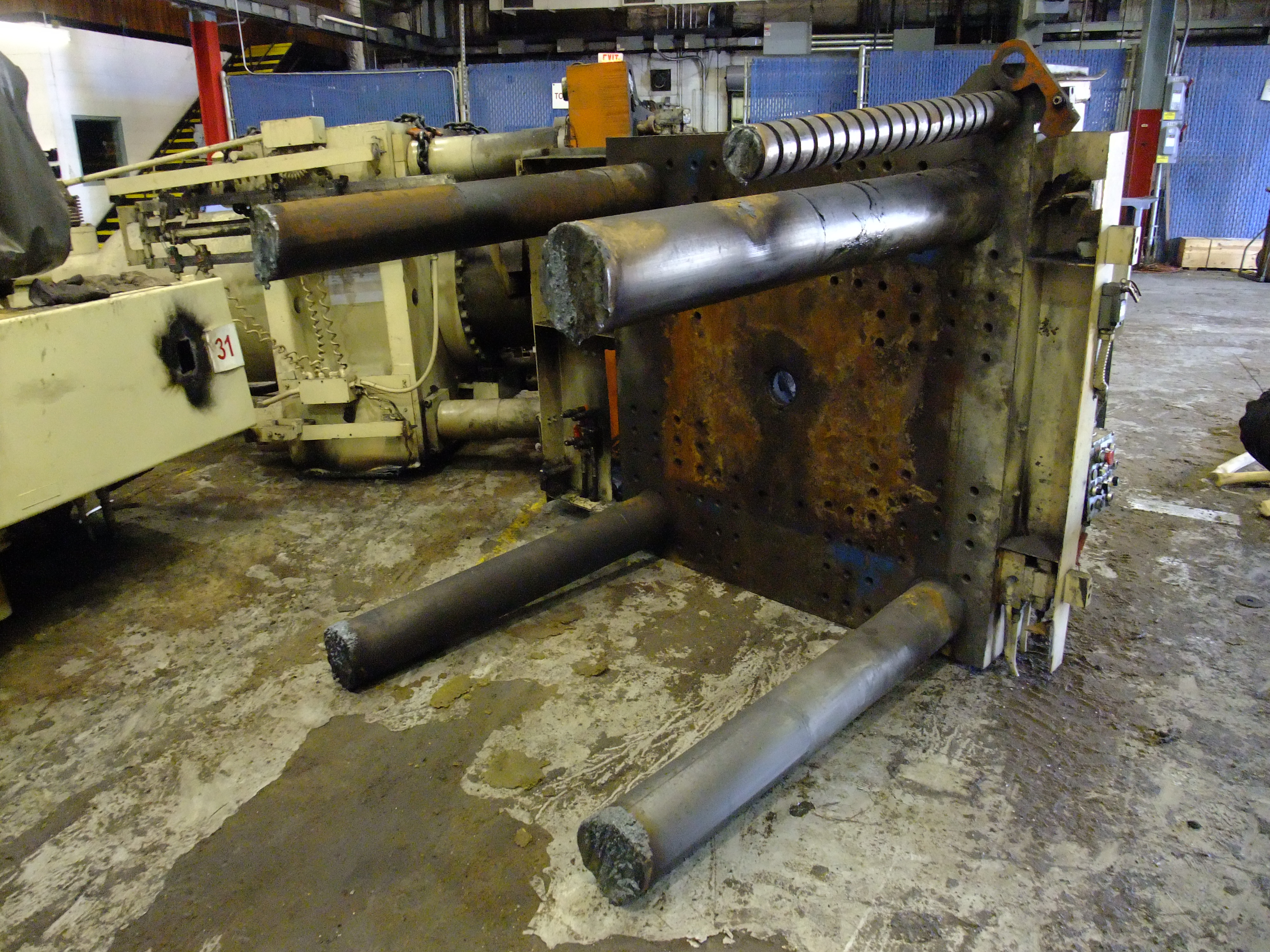

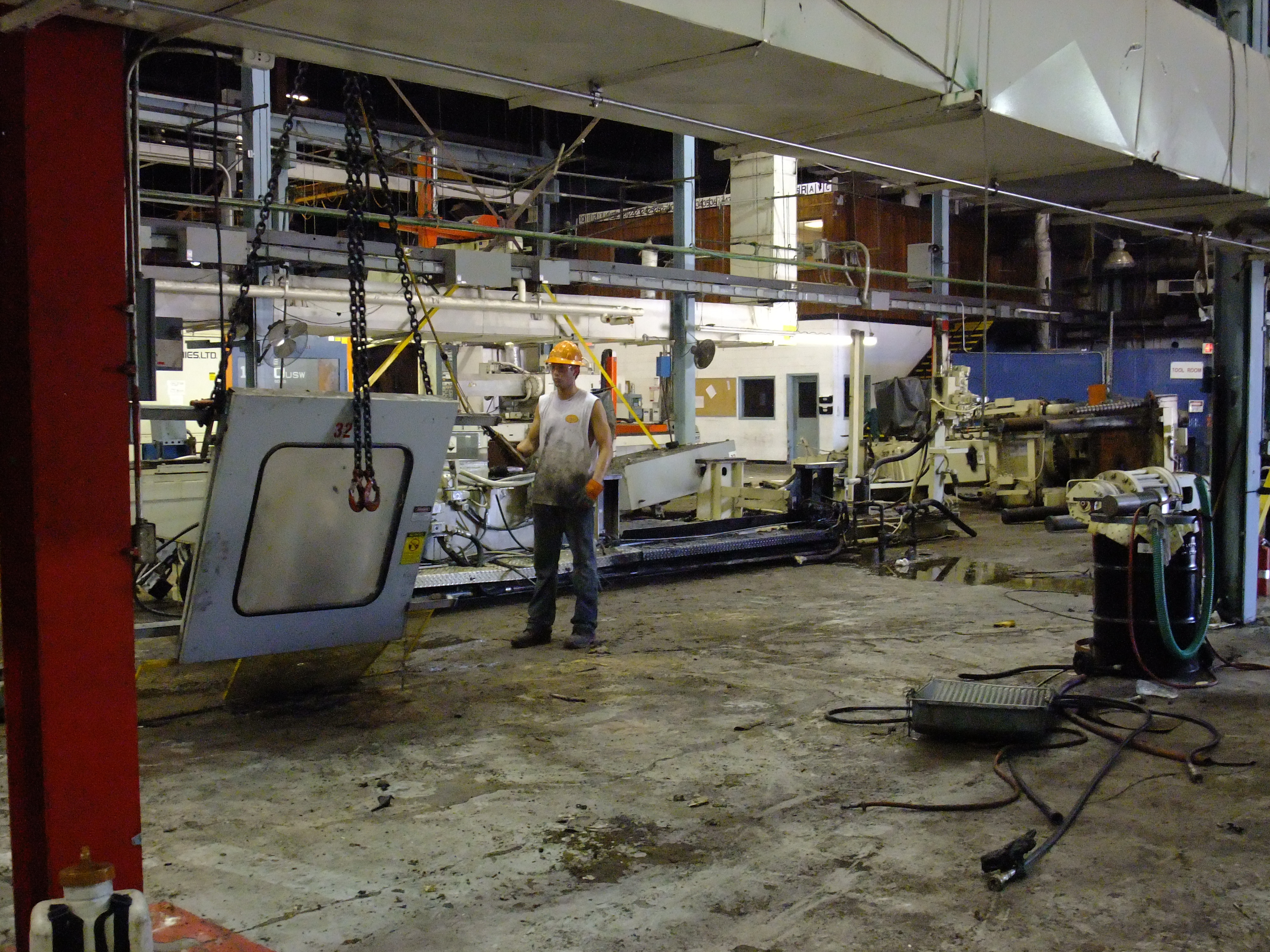

== Website ==
- Plastech's Official Website
