= GreenTech Automotive =

U.S. electric automotive manufacturer

- Industry: Automotive
- Founded: 2009; 17 years ago in Virginia, U.S.
- Founder: Charlie Wang
- Defunct: 2018
- Fate: Chapter 11 bankruptcy
- Headquarters: Tunica County, Mississippi, U.S.
- Area served: Mississippi
- Key people: Charlie Wang (CEO)
- Products: electric cars
- Owner: Charlie Wang
- Website: www.wmgta.com

GreenTech Automotive (also known as WM GreenTech Automotive Corp.) was a United States automotive manufacturer founded in 2009 that planned to develop and produce ultralow-power electric cars resembling very small cars or large golf carts. It was a Virginia corporation, with its operations based in Mississippi.

Its founder and CEO was Charlie Wang. Between 2009 and 2013, GreenTech raised $141.5 million from Chinese investors, and $6 million from Mississippi and the state's Tunica County, with the company promising to invest $60 million and create 350 jobs in the county. Wang promised to build a $2 billion plant in Mississippi, and said that the company planned to produce 250,000 cars a year and provide 4,500 local jobs at full production.

However, it produced few cars, if any. GreenTech declared bankruptcy in 2018, paying its investors and creditors only $7 million.

== History ==
=== 2009–13 ===
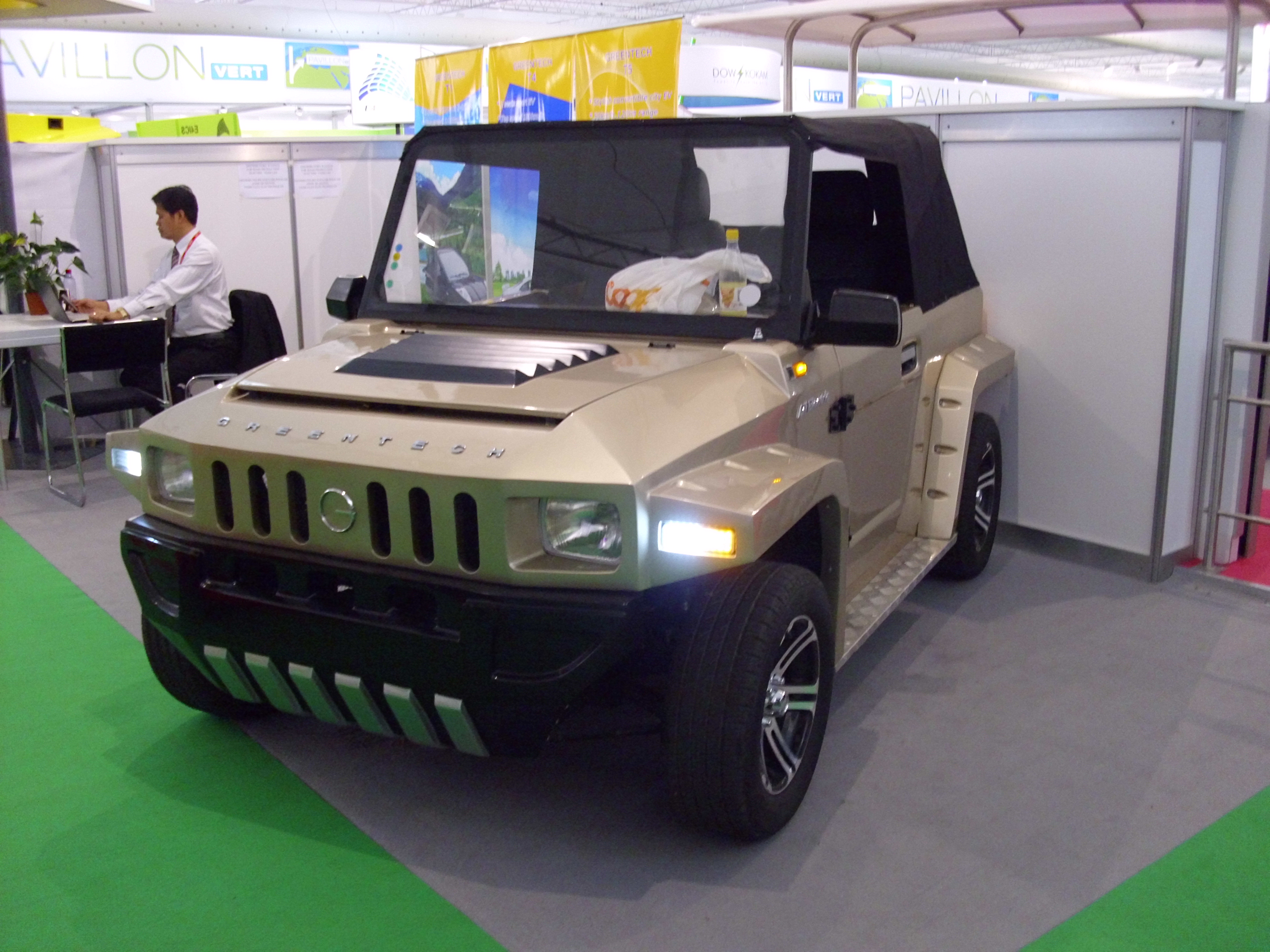
2011 Greentech T3

GreenTech Automotive was a Virginia corporation that was founded in 2009 by lawyer Charlie Wang (Xiaolin Wang), who was also its CEO. Its purpose was to manufacture, in rural Mississippi, ultralow-power electric cars that resembled very small cars or large golf carts.

The legal backstory to the GreenTech Automotive's creation took place months earlier, in connection with an electric car company similar to Greentech, Hybrid Kinetic Automotive Corp. At that time, Charlie Wang was sued by a business partner of his with regard to control of Hybrid Kinetic Automotive. U.S. federal chief judge Michael P. Mills wrote in an opinion on the dispute that Wang had taken actions of "dubious legality" in issuing Hybrid Kinetic Automotive Corp. stock. GreenTech was born out of the dispute. Judge Mills noted that the company website described Wang as "a graduate of Duke Law School" who had formerly served as a "partner and the head of Asia practice for a prominent New York law firm [Cadwalader, Wickersham & Taft]" and who had, prior to that, held a similar position with a "prestigious Washington law firm"; however, the judge went on to comment that "While prominence and prestige are laudable attributes in today's society, the older virtues of common honesty and integrity sometimes still carry the day." Prior to the Hybrid Kinetic controversy, Wang had recently left Cadwalader, Wickersham & Taft after allegedly forcing businessman David Ji to sign over control of Ji's electronics company to Wang's client, while Ji was held in custody in China. The Hybrid Kinetic lawsuit was settled out of court with $1.5 million being paid to Wang's business partner, who also retained the name "Hybrid Kinetic," as Wang began aftesh using the "GreenTech" name.

In October 2009, Wang promised to build a $2 billion plant in the Mississippi Delta. He announced that GreenTech planned to produce 250,000 cars a year at full production. Wang said "It will mean 4,500 jobs at full production," and that the company aspired to command at least one-third of the U.S. automotive market down the line.

David Cole, the chairman of the Center for Automotive Research, said Wang's claims were "very inflated from reality," and likely designed to attract investors. Michelle Krebs, senior analyst at edmunds, which provides car research and reviews, said that demand for cars of that type was "extremely limited," given that many states did not permit such cars on their highways, and concluded: "What's the point?"

A March 2010 Virginia State Corporation Commission document reported that GreenTech was owned 75% by Charlie Wang through a holding company that he owned, and 25% by businessman and politician Terry McAuliffe (who later became the Governor of Virginia); by 2012, McAuliffe had divested his interest.

Between 2009 and 2013, GreenTech raised $141.5 million from Chinese investors under the U.S. immigrant investor EB-5 program. That program gave foreigners a U.S. permanent residency green card if the foreigner invested $500,000 in a company that helped create jobs in a rural or high-unemployment area in the United States, if the $500,000 investment created “10 or more direct or indirect jobs.” As of August 2013, however, out of 91 foreign investors in GreenTech, only one had received permanent residency status. Incentive financing in GreenTech from the state of Mississippi and Tunica County, Mississippi, added up to another $6 million.

In May 2010, GreenTech acquired Hong Kong-based EuAuto Technology and its Mycar vehicle, a neighborhood electric vehicle with a top speed of 25 mph (40 km/h), and relocated the company's operations to the United States. GreenTech's first manufacturing facility was temporarily in Horn Lake, Mississippi. The company declined an Associated Press request to tour the Horn Lake manufacturing facility.

Watchdog.org articles about GreenTech led, according to GreenTech, to federal investigations and negative attention. In 2013 GreenTech sued the Franklin Center for Government and Public Integrity, a nonprofit investigative-journalism organization, and its website Watchdog.org (as well as a journalist for the company), in federal court for $85 million for libel (noting among other things the website's characterization of GreenTech's company headquarters as "a broom closet"). However, GreenTech's lawsuit was dismissed.

=== 2014–2020 ===
GreenTech merged with fledgling VL Automotive in 2014, intending to develop a traditionally powered version of the Fisker Karma, called the WM Destino. Also in 2014, Greentech was enmeshed in litigation in the Eastern District of Michigan against Plastech Holding Corp., which said that GreenTech intentionally interfered with Plastech's relationship with Chinese carmaker JAC Motors, and that Wang had met with Plastech about serving as the middleman in its deal, and "knew perfectly well that we had an agreement and interfered with it."

In 2016, Barbara Tuchel, who had been a candidate for the Tunica County Board of Supervisors, looking over the vacant site of what had been promised to be a new GreenTech production facility in Tunica County, Mississippi, and said: "Welcome to GreenTech. Isn't this ridiculous?" That same year, Wang said that construction of the Tunica building had been delayed by unstable soil in the region, but that "By the end of this year, the whole state-of-the-art facility will be done." The facility was shut down in January 2017.

GreenTech had committed to invest $60 million in a Mississippi manufacturing plant, but it produced few cars–if any. Mississippi State Auditor Stacey Pickering began a review in 2016 that found documentation reflecting only $3 million spent by GreenTech on automotive assembly equipment and parts. While the company had also promised to create 350 full-time jobs, it was found to never have created more than 94 active, full-time jobs in Mississippi at any time. Three employees at the Horn Lake facility said that GreenTech management sometimes asked workers to make believe that they were assembling cars when potential investors visited the facility, usually from China, and that employees would remove parts from earlier assembled cars and reattach them. As one described it: "We would just be standing there acting like we were doing something. But it was pre-planned ... It was like a show."

In July 2017, Mississippi State Auditor Pickering demanded that GreenTech and Charlie Wang pay Mississippi $6 million, because Greentech had not lived up to its promises to invest $60 million and create 350 jobs in Tunica County. The auditor said: "I would venture that there isn't really much of an operation in Tunica at all. This appears to have been a game of smoke and mirrors, and a corporate entity that never had any intention to deliver on the promises it made." In November 2017, Mississippi Attorney General Jim Hood sued the company. The company made only one, single $150,000 payment to the state of Mississippi.

Also in November 2017, a total of 32 Chinese investors in the company brought a $17 million fraud lawsuit against Greentech, McAuliffe, Charlie Wang, Anthony Rodham (a brother of Hillary Clinton), and other company executives in a Fairfax County, Virginia court. The lawsuit accused McAuliffe, Wang, and Rodham of lies, manipulation, fraudulent misrepresentations, and running a "scam." The investors said that they were each swindled out of $560,000. They also said that as a result they risked being deported from the U.S. because the Department of Homeland Security had determined that Greentech had not generated the number of jobs necessary for the number of visas that were issued through the EB-5 program. In June 2017 the United States Court of Appeals for the Fourth Circuit upheld a ruling from a lower court federal judge, who said that the lawsuit was not specific enough about how the allegedly misleading and false statements induced the Chinese nationals to invest in Greentech; at the same time, the court of appeals noted that it strongly disapproved of the claims the defendants had made in promoting Greentech.

GreenTech declared Chapter 11 bankruptcy in February 2018. It maintained that it had only minimal assets when it filed for bankruptcy. The bankruptcy filing noted that $7.5 million had been won by 12 investors who had sued the company, and that the company faced further pending lawsuits. In a 2020 final settlement, GreenTech paid investors and creditors only $7 million. Mississippi and Tunica County recovered only $575,000.

== Products ==
- GTA Mycar, a 2-door, 2-seater Neighborhood Electric Vehicle designed in 2003 by Giorgetto Giugiaro, and developed by EuAuto Technology
