= GTA MyCar =

GreenTech Automotive MyCar
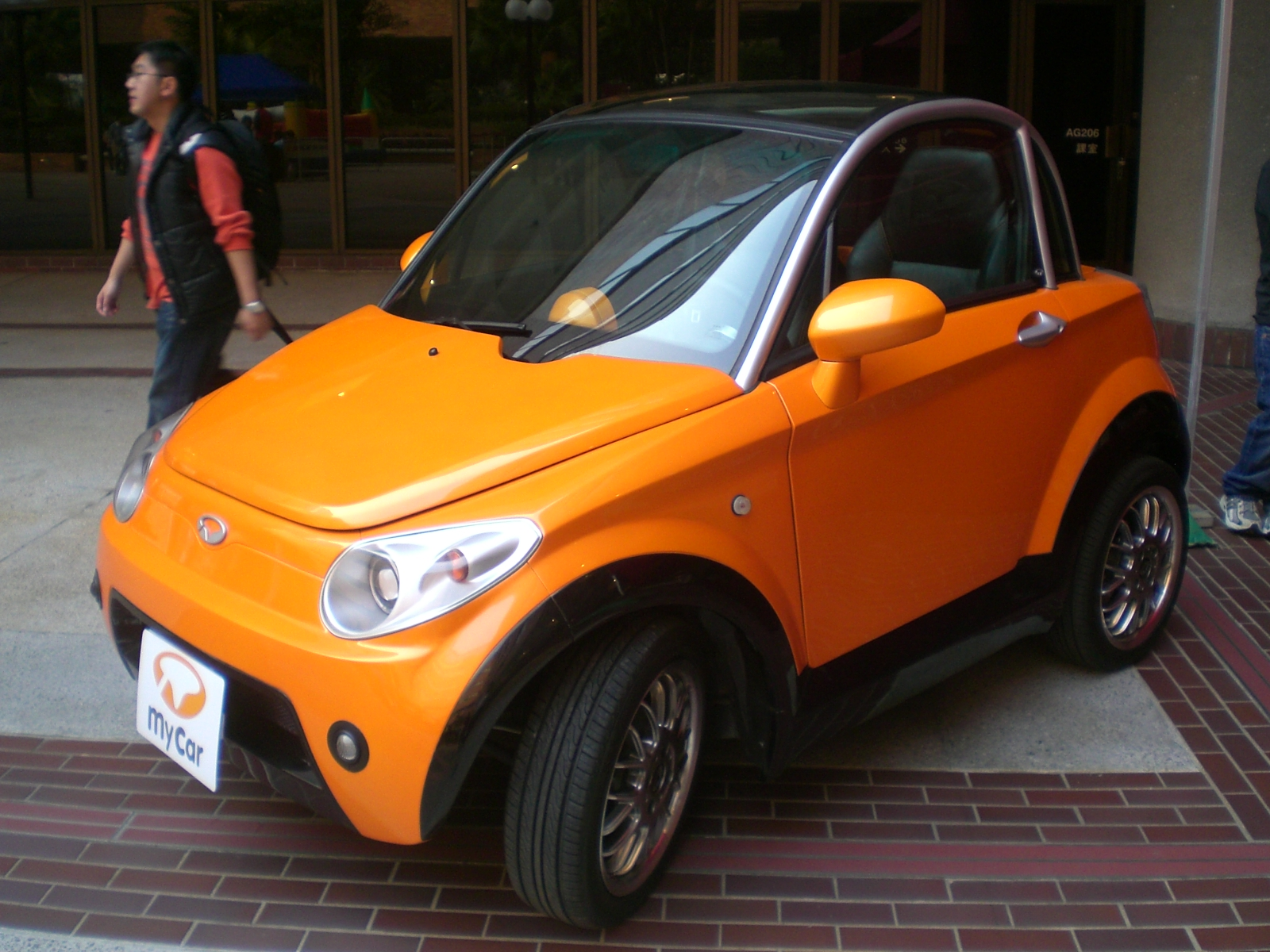

Overview
- Manufacturer: EuAuto Technology (to 2010); GreenTech Automotive
- Also called: EuAuto MyCar; Nice MyCar; Saleen Maimai
- Assembly: Dongguan, China; Tunica County, Mississippi

Body and chassis
- Class: City car
- Layout: Rear-wheel drive electric vehicle

Powertrain
- Electric motor: 6.7 hp (5 kW)
- Transmission: Electronic Controlled Single Speed Automatic with differential (forward, reverse, neutral)
- Battery: 9.6 kWh Lead AGM, maintenance free

Dimensions
- Wheelbase: 1,691 mm
- Length: 2,653 mm
- Width: 1,396 mm
- Height: 1,446 mm
- Curb weight: 1,570 lb (710 kg) (without a driver, with batteries)

The GTA MyCar (styled MyCar) is an electric vehicle originally produced by EuAuto Technology based in Hong Kong, The company's manufacturing facility was originally in Dongguan, China. The MyCar was classified as a neighborhood electric vehicle (NEV) in the United States due to its low top speed. In 2010 GreenTech Automotive in the United States acquired EuAuto. Manufacturing ended in 2017, and GreenTech Automotive declared bankruptcy in 2018.

== History ==
The car was first conceived by Giorgetto Giugiaro of Italdesign in 2003. The propulsion system was engineered in co-operation with Hong Kong Polytechnic University.

In 2010, GreenTech Automotive bought EuAuto Technology, Ltd., and announced plans to manufacture and market vehicles in the United States. GreenTech relocated the company's operations and manufacturing to the United States. Its first manufacturing facility was temporarily in Horn Lake, Mississippi. GreenTech declined an Associated Press request to tour the Horn Lake manufacturing facility.

The first U.S. manufactured MyCar vehicles, which were supposed be exported to Denmark, were supposed to come off the assembly line in Horn Lake, Mississippi, on 4 July 2011. As of August 2013, GreenTech had not disclosed any sales figures, but was promising production of 30,000 vehicles annually in 2014. Subsequently, the company broke ground on a new plant in Tunica, Mississippi, at the start of 2014.

GreenTech produced few cars, if any. It declared bankruptcy in February 2018.

== Specification ==
Performance:

- Maximum Gradient: More than 20% at GVW
- Consumption Approx.: 196 Wh/mile

Weights and Dimensions:

- Body and Finish: Painted Fiberglass Reinforced Plastic (FRP) Body Panels
- Steering: Rack-and-Pinion, Adjustable Steering Wheel
- Turning Radius: 3.75 m
- Rear Luggage Compartment: 86 litres
- Unladen Weight: 710 kg (without a driver, with batteries)
- Maximum Safe Load: 200 kg
- Total Authorized Laden Weight: 910 kg
- Track: Front: 1,173 mm – Rear: 1,227

Technical Specifications:

Batteries:

- Type: Lead AGM, maintenance free
- Number of Batteries in pack: 4
- Pack Tension: 48V
- Pack Capacity: 200 Ah
- Power On board: 9.6kWh

Onboard Battery Charger:

- Domestic Electric Supply: 190 – 255V AC, 16A
- Charging Power: 2100 W
- Recharge Time: 8 – 10 hours (quick charge: 3 hours)
- Charger: 48V DC
- Battery Self Discharge: 0.83% per week at 20oC

Motorization:

- Motor Type: 48V DC Electric Motor with Separate Excitation
- Maximum Power: 5 kW
- Transmission: Electronic Controlled Single Speed Automatic with differential (forward, reverse, neutral)
- Motor and Batteries Location: Middle of Vehicle
- Tyres and Wheels: 14" Aluminum Alloy Wheels (165 / 60 R14)
- Auxiliary Equipment: Powered by a 12V 18Ah Lead AGM battery re-charged by a DC/DC Converter

Speed Control: Electronic Controller with Regenerative Brake to increase drive range

Chassis: Steel Tubular Space Frame with Roof Frame

Suspension:

- Type: Independent on All Wheels
- Front: McPherson Type with Coil Springs and Dampers
- Rear: Trailing Arm Type with Coil Springs and Dampers

Braking System:

- Type of braking: Dual Circuit Hydraulic Braking System
- Front: 209 mm diameter brake discs
- Rear: 209 mm diameter brake discs
- Parking Brakes: Mechanical on Rear Axle

== Design ==
The Giorgetto Giugiaro designed MyCar, a 2-door, 2-seater coupe measuring 2.6 m long, 1.4 m wide, and 1.4 m high. The car can accommodate occupants up to 6"5, with a boot front and rear, giving a combined space of 140 liters. The maximum payload is 200 kg. The car came in two versions: Standard and Select. Identical in the drivetrain, the Select adds leather seats, a panoramic glass roof, parking sensors, an upgraded radio, larger alloy wheels, and body-colored steering mirrors.

== Sales ==
The UK was the first market to sell the MyCar, through EV Stores in 2009. France followed soon after, with Monaco-based Newteon handling distribution. Late in 2009 Meco World was announced as the distributor for Austria. EU Auto announced in October that the car had been approved for use in Hong Kong and that sales were to begin in the home market of the car.

Production of the MyCar in the United States was scheduled to begin in the first part of 2011. The base price for the first 100,000 units was announced as $10,000 US. By 2014, the MyCar was still not on sale in the US market, and a list price of US$15,500 was being discussed.
