= Ferrari GG50 =

Concept car by Ferrari

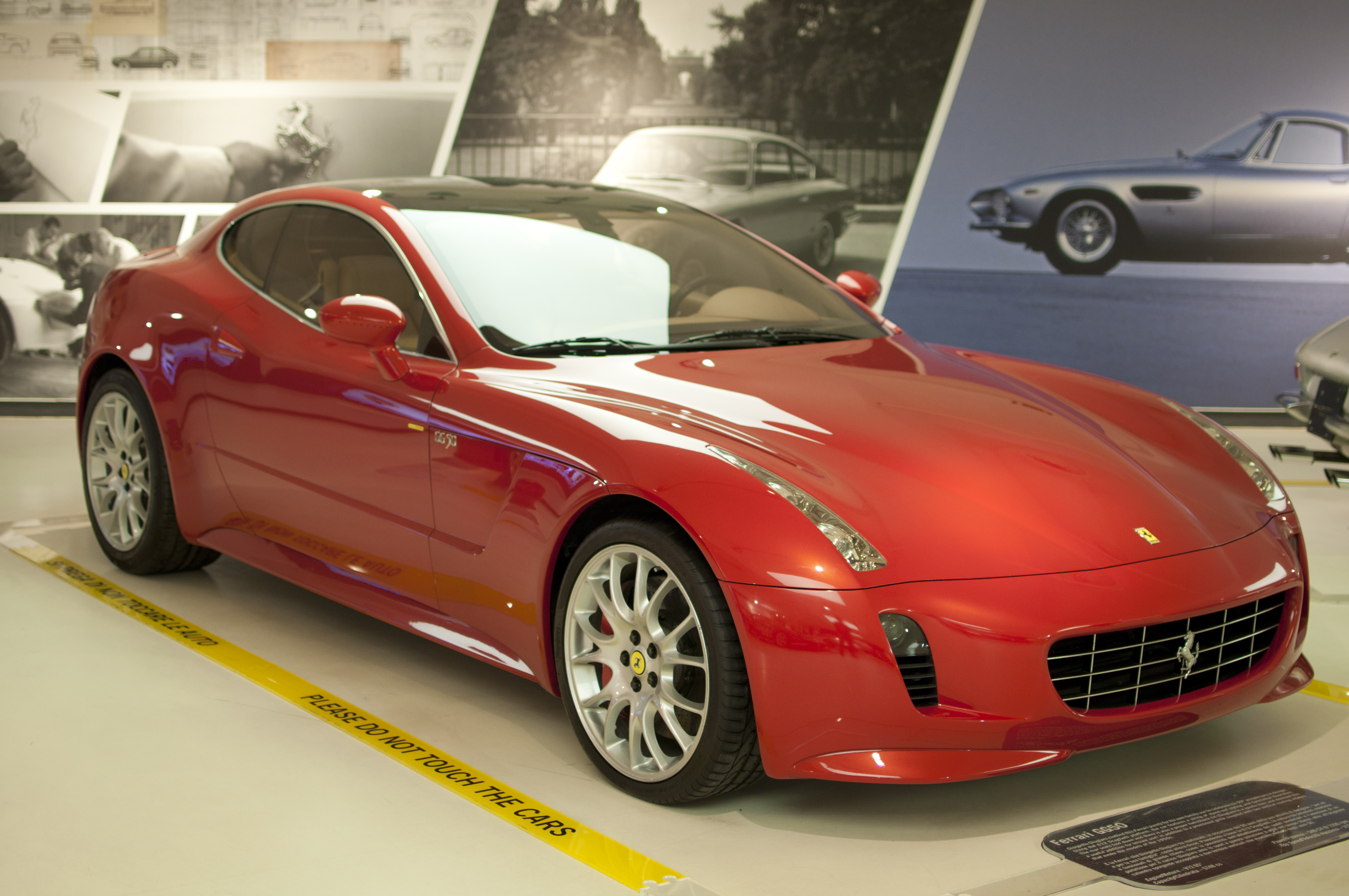
The Ferrari GG50

The Ferrari GG50 is a concept car created by Ferrari to mark the fifty years during which Giorgetto Giugiaro had been designing cars. It was introduced at the 2005 Tokyo Motor Show.

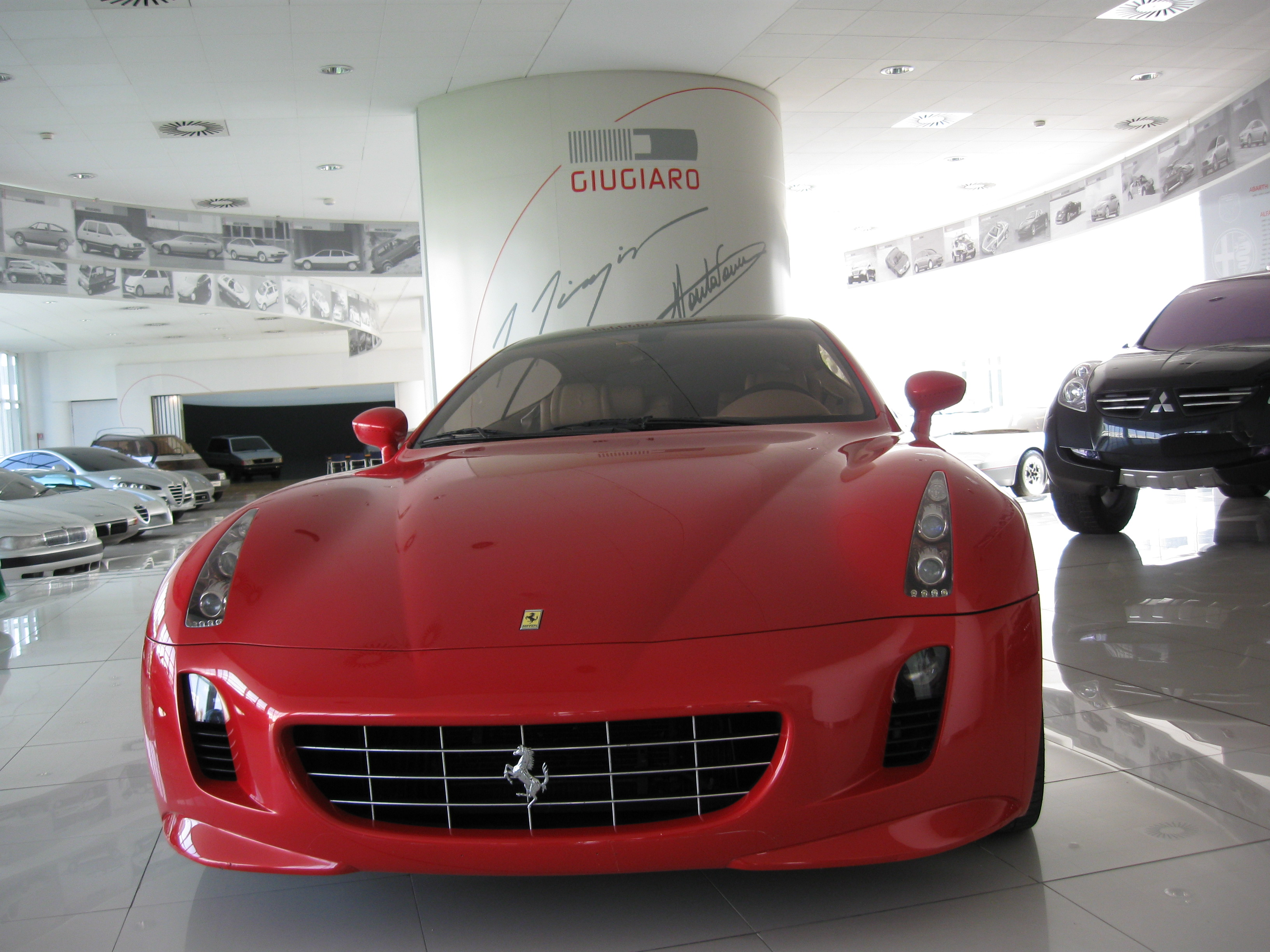
2005 Ferrari GG50 "Giorgetto Giugiaro 50" On display in the Italdesign showroom in Moncalieri, Italy

== Engine and performance ==
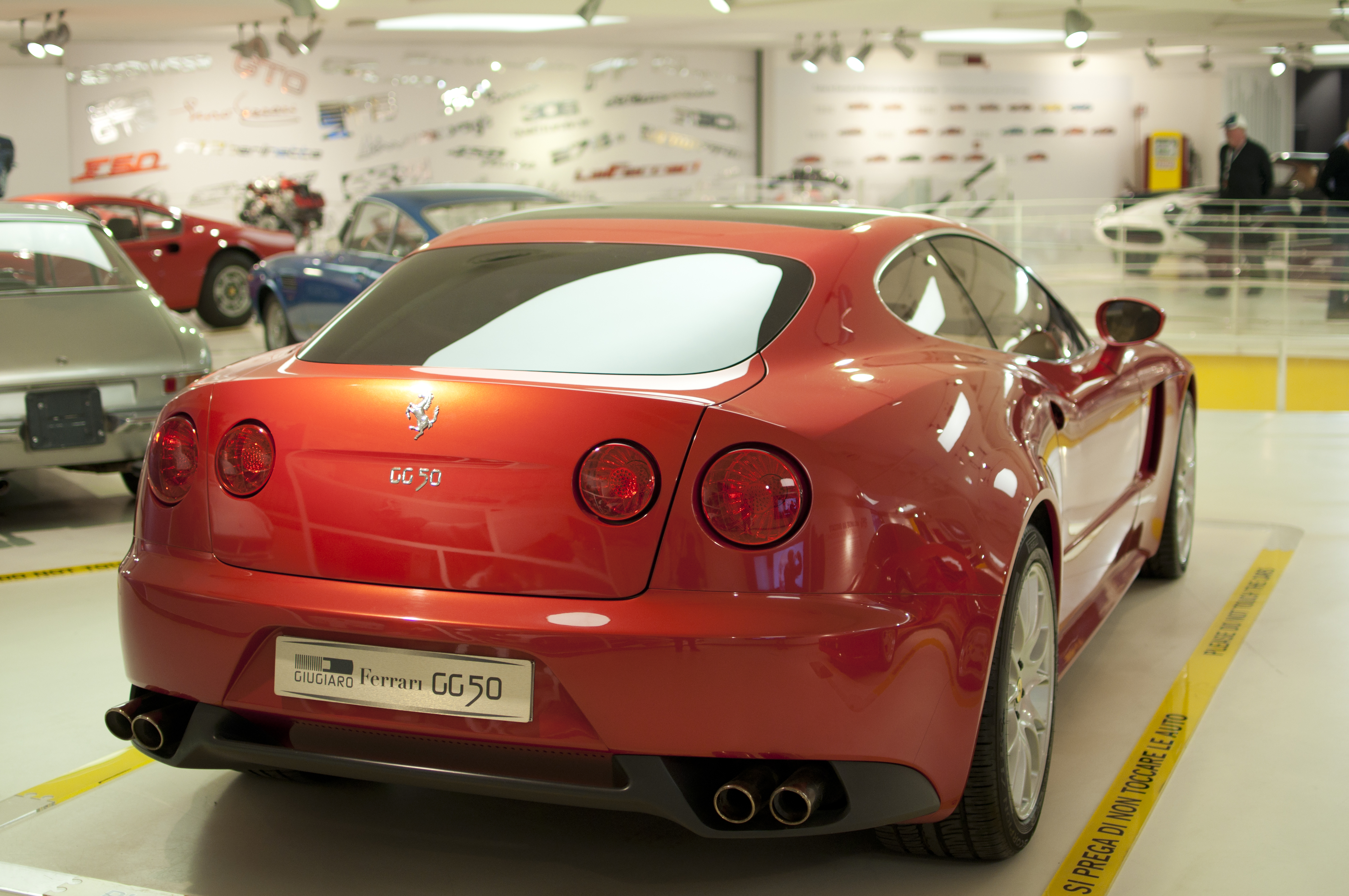
Rear view

The Ferrari GG50 has special modifications inspired by Formula 1, to improve performance. It uses a 65 degree V12 naturally aspirated petrol engine. The engine develops peak power of 540 horsepower (403 kW), which is 94 horsepower (70 kW) per litre. The compression ratio is 11.2:1. The GG50 uses a sequential mode automatic transmission.

== Design ==
The GG50 is a 2+2 coupé "supercar". The interior is mostly carried from the Ferrari 612 Scaglietti on which it is based, as well as part of the exterior design. The exterior body is around four inches shorter and has a differently shaped nose. Some cues, such as the steering wheel, derive from Ferrari's F1 vehicles of the past. Unique parts of the GG50 are its dashboard and the fact that the GG50 uses the Pioneer AVIC–X1R satellite navigation system.
