= Giorgetto Giugiaro =

Italian automobile designer (born 1938)

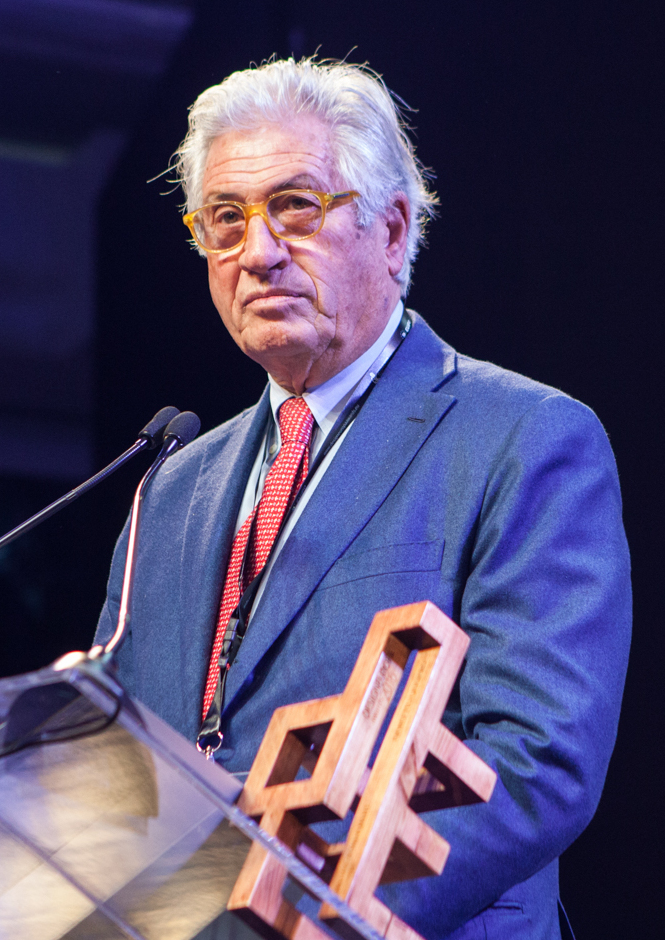
- Giugiaro in 2016
- Born: 7 August 1938 (age 88); Garessio, Piedmont, Kingdom of Italy
- Occupation: Designer
- Known for: Car designing
- Spouse: Maria Teresa Serra
- Children: 2

Giorgetto Giugiaro (Italian pronunciation: [dʒorˈdʒetto dʒuˈdʒaːro]; born 7 August 1938) is an Italian automotive designer. He has worked on supercars and popular everyday vehicles. He was named Car Designer of the Century in 1999 and inducted into the Automotive Hall of Fame in 2002. He was awarded the Compasso d'Oro industrial design award six times, including a lifetime achievement recognition in 1984.

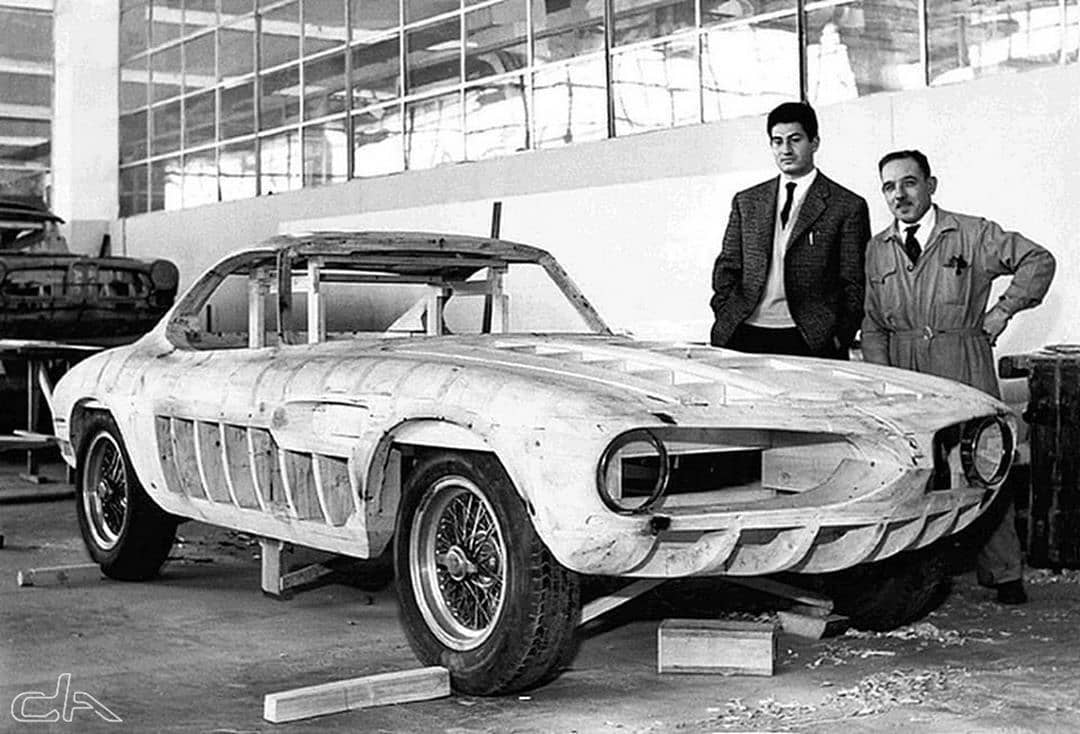
Giugiaro (left) and a Bertone employee with a wooden model of the 1962 Ferrari 250 GT

In addition to cars, Giugiaro designed camera bodies for Nikon, the Navigation promenade of Porto Santo Stefano, in 1983, the organ of the Cathedral of Lausanne (composed of about 7000 pipes) in 2003, and developed a new pasta shape, "Marille". He also designed several watch models for Seiko, mainly racing chronographs, as well as office furniture for Okamura Corporation.

== Influence on design ==
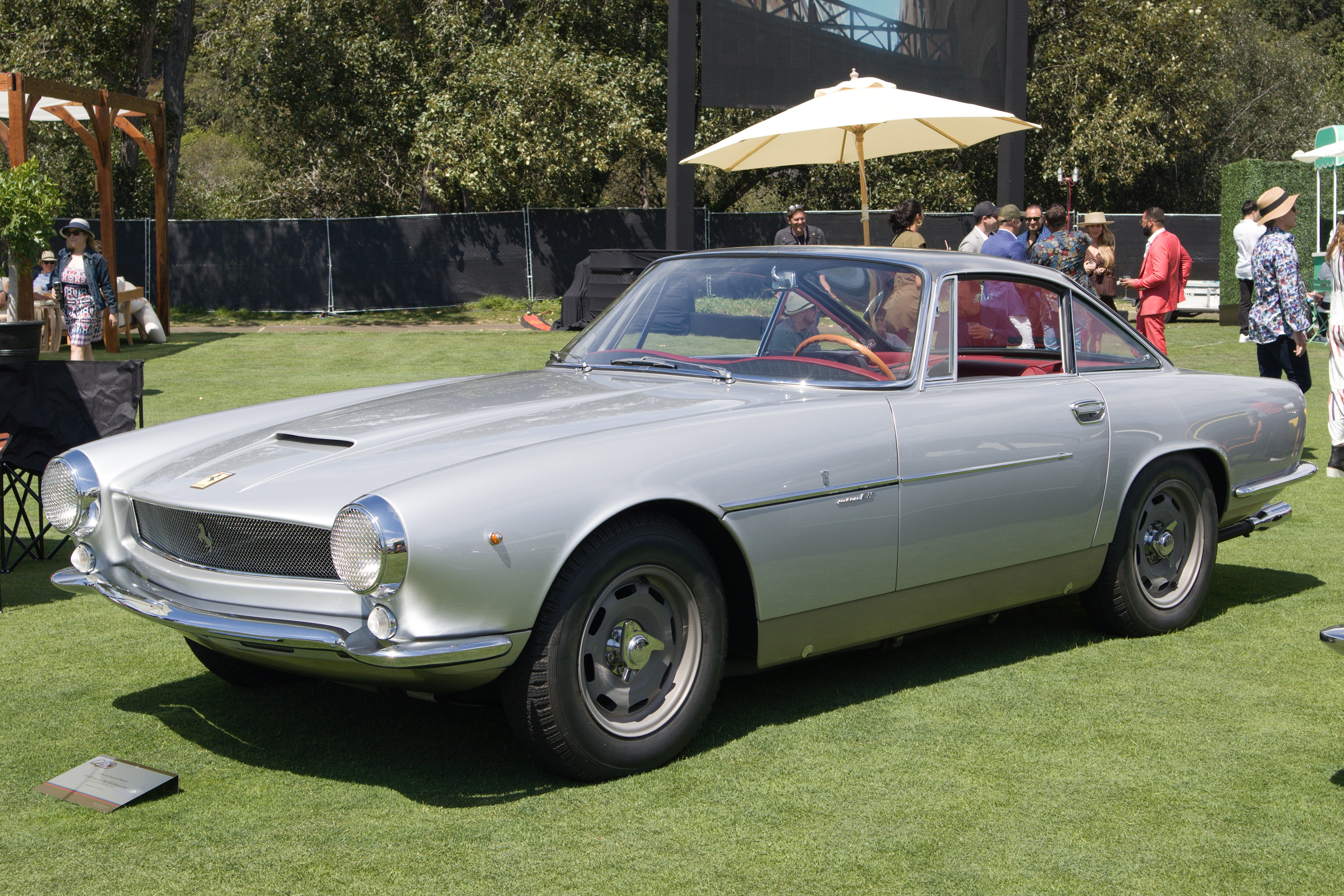
1960 Ferrari 250 GT Berlinetta SWB Speciale designed at Bertone at age 21

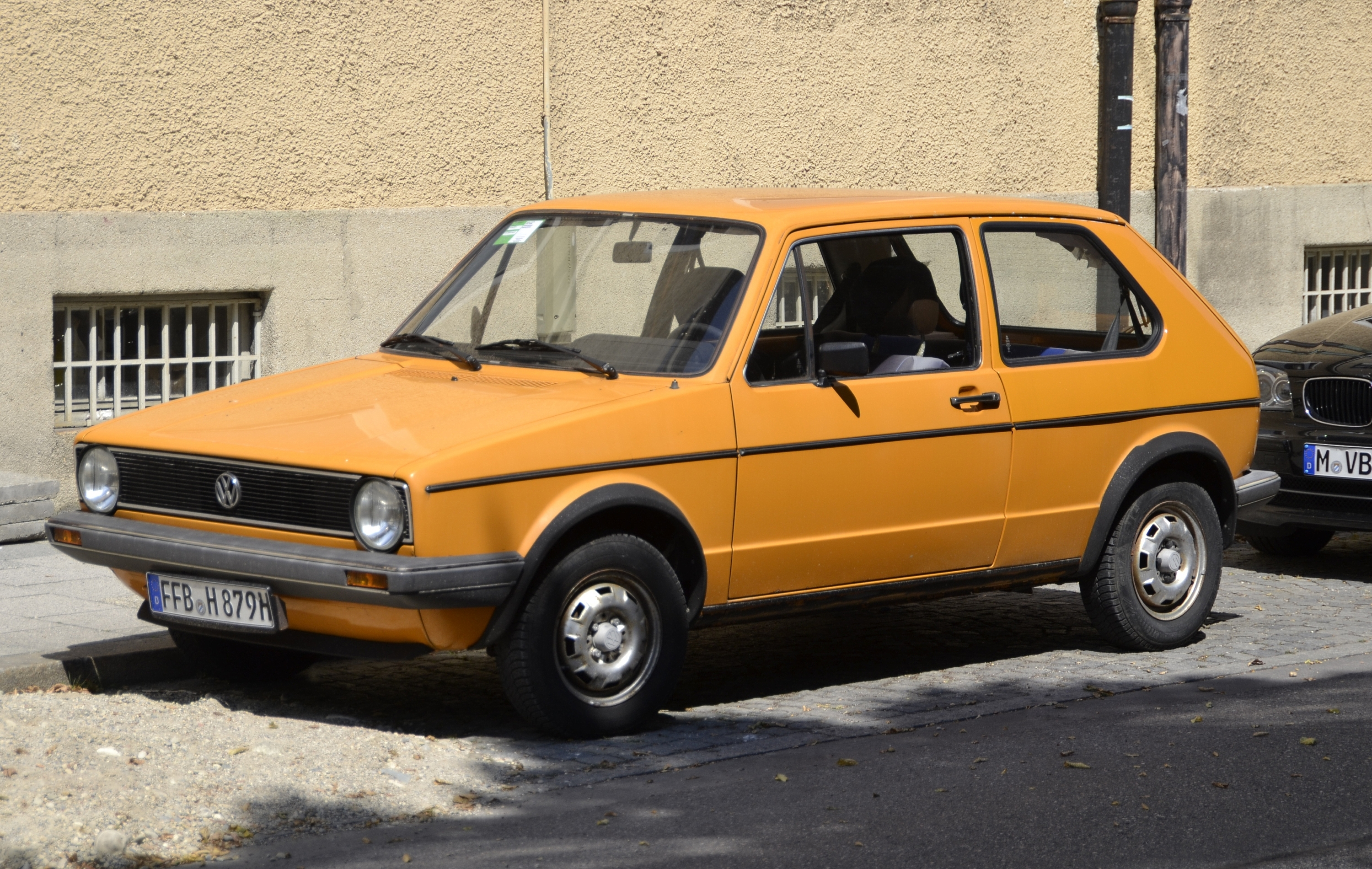
Volkswagen Golf Mk1

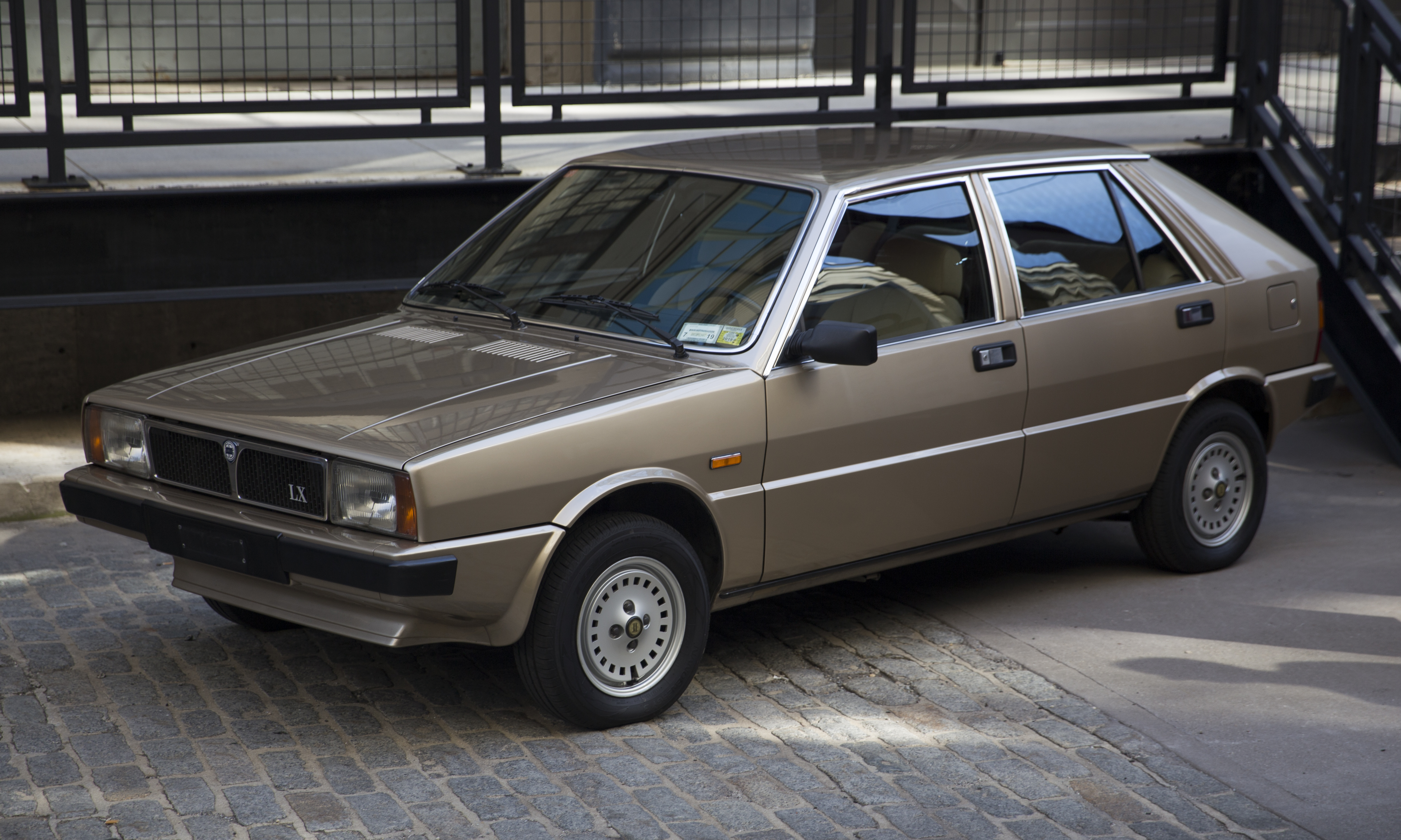
Lancia Delta Mk 1, in "folded paper" style

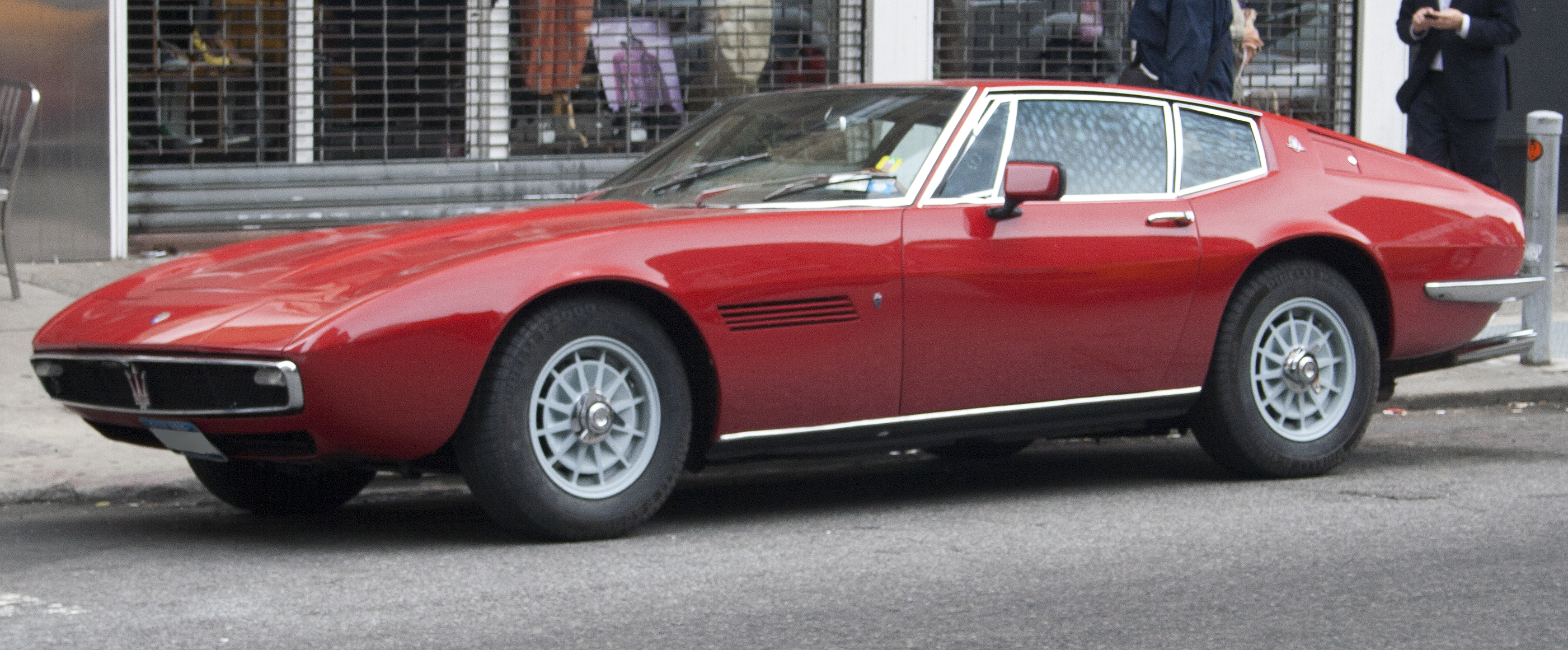
Maserati Ghibli

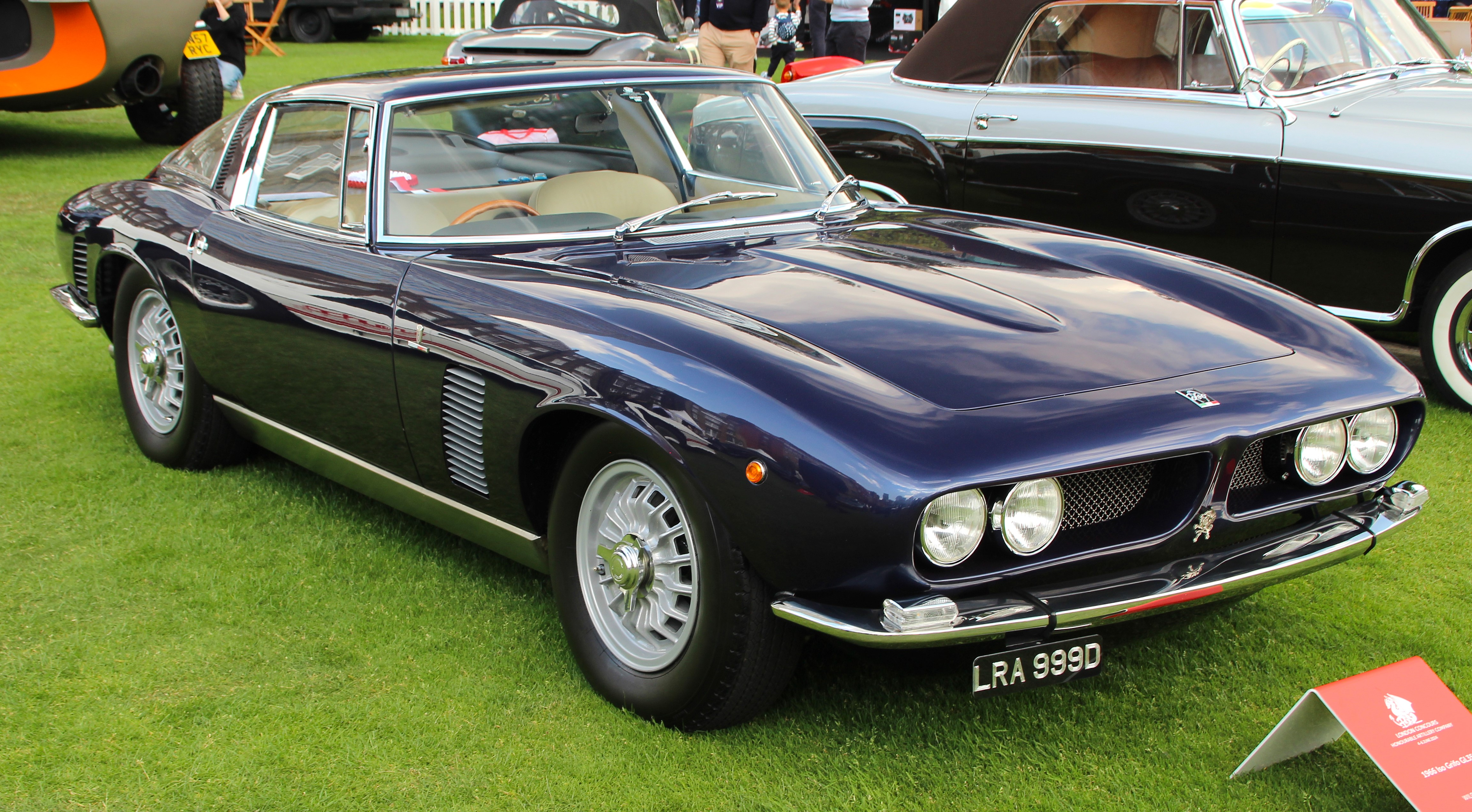
Iso Grifo

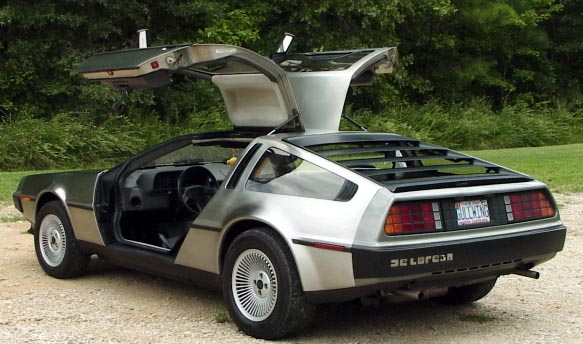
DMC DeLorean

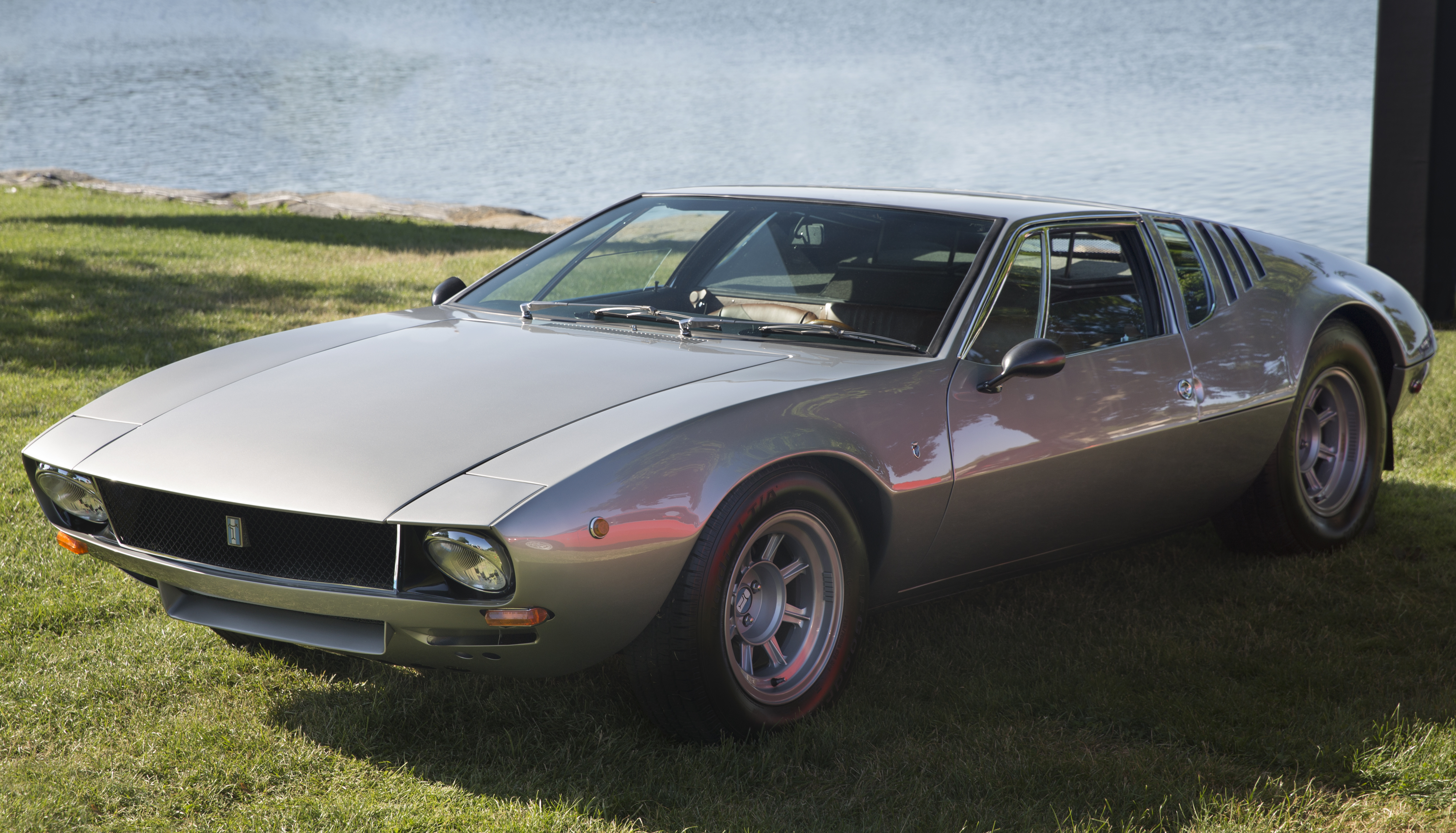
De Tomaso Mangusta

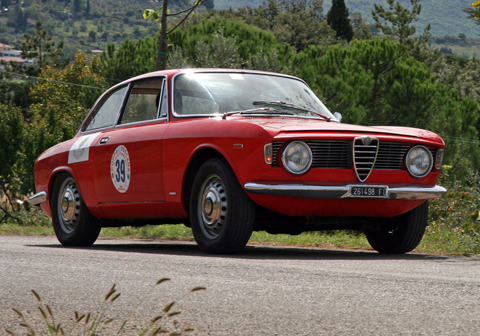
Alfa Romeo Giulia Sprint GT

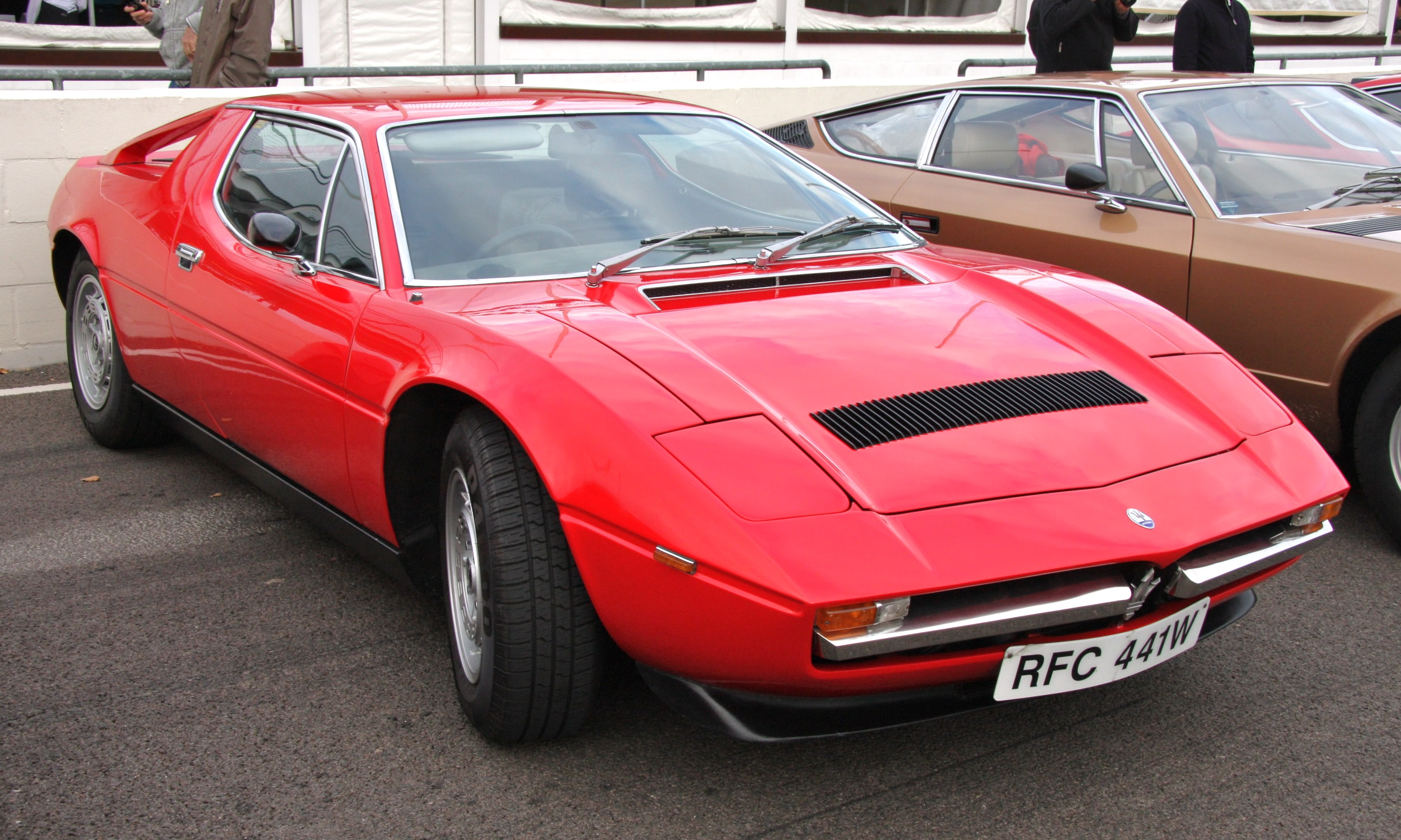
Maserati Merak

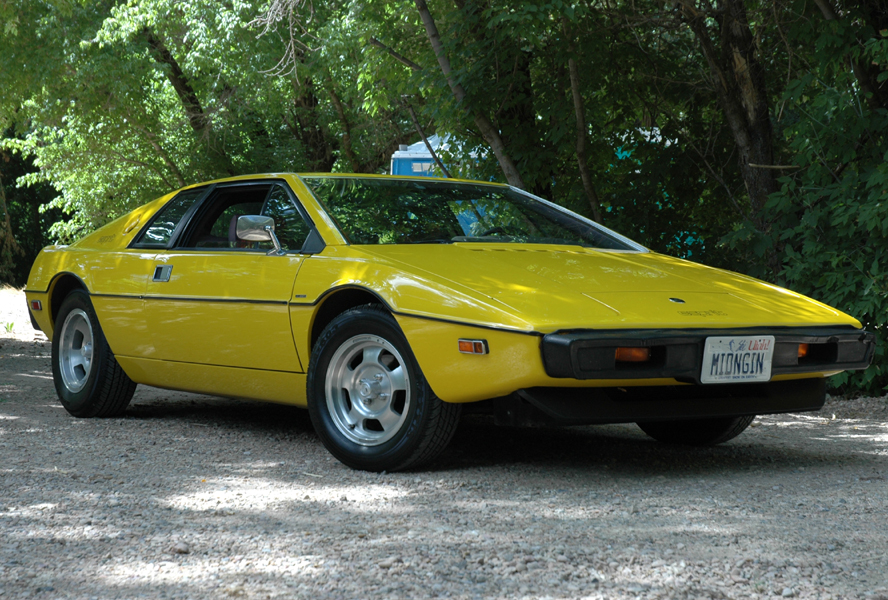
Lotus Esprit S1

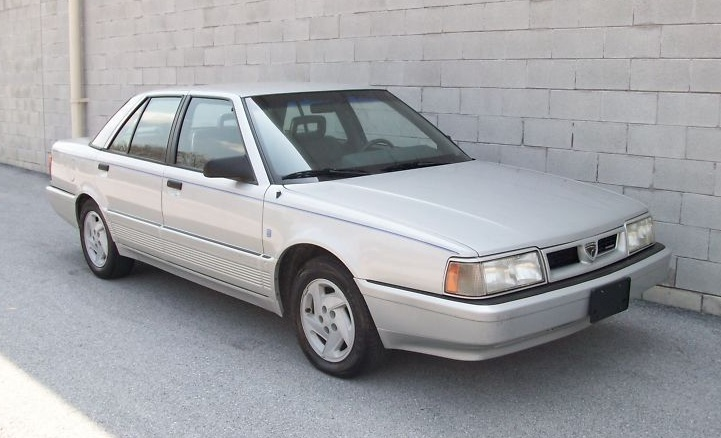
Eagle Premier featured "design giugiaro" badges on the front bumper sides

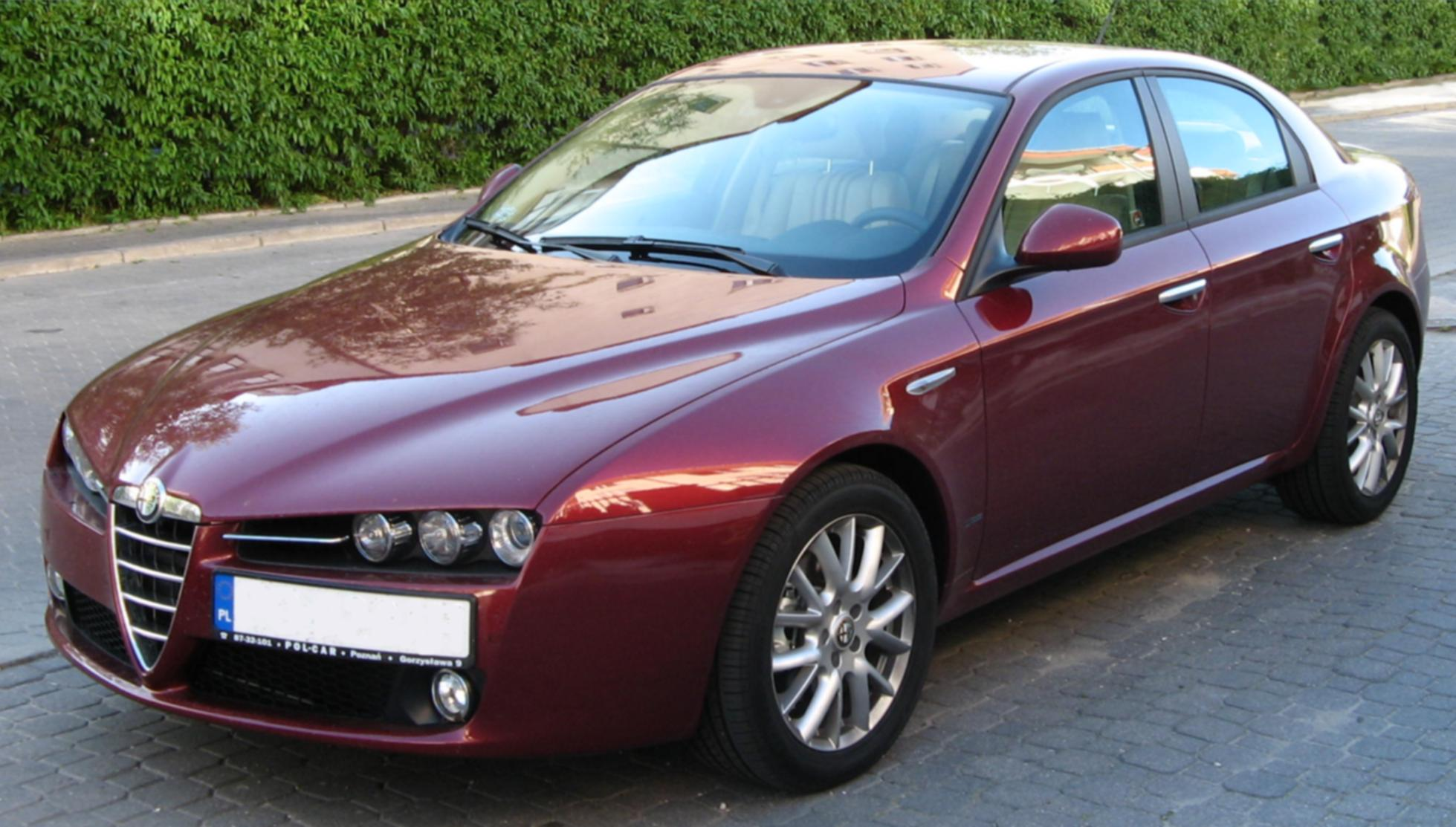
Alfa Romeo 159

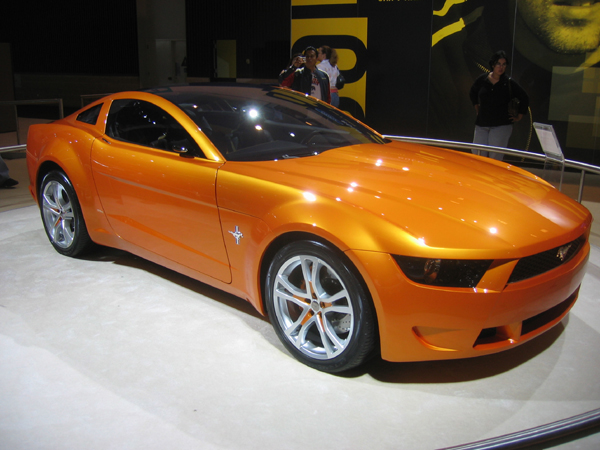
Giugiaro Ford Mustang 2006 Concept Car

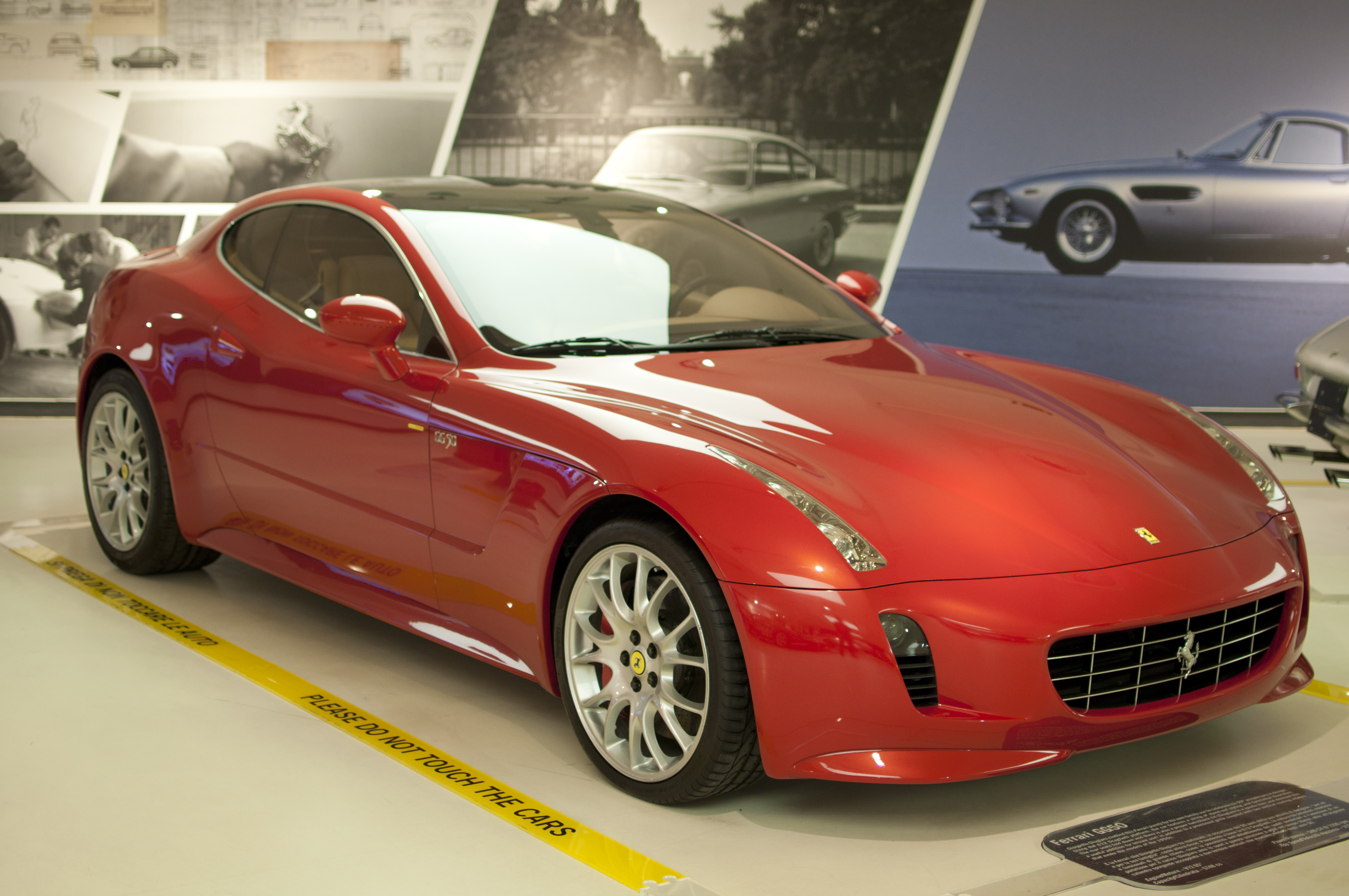
2005 Ferrari GG50 ("Giorgetto Giugiaro 50") in the Museo Ferrari

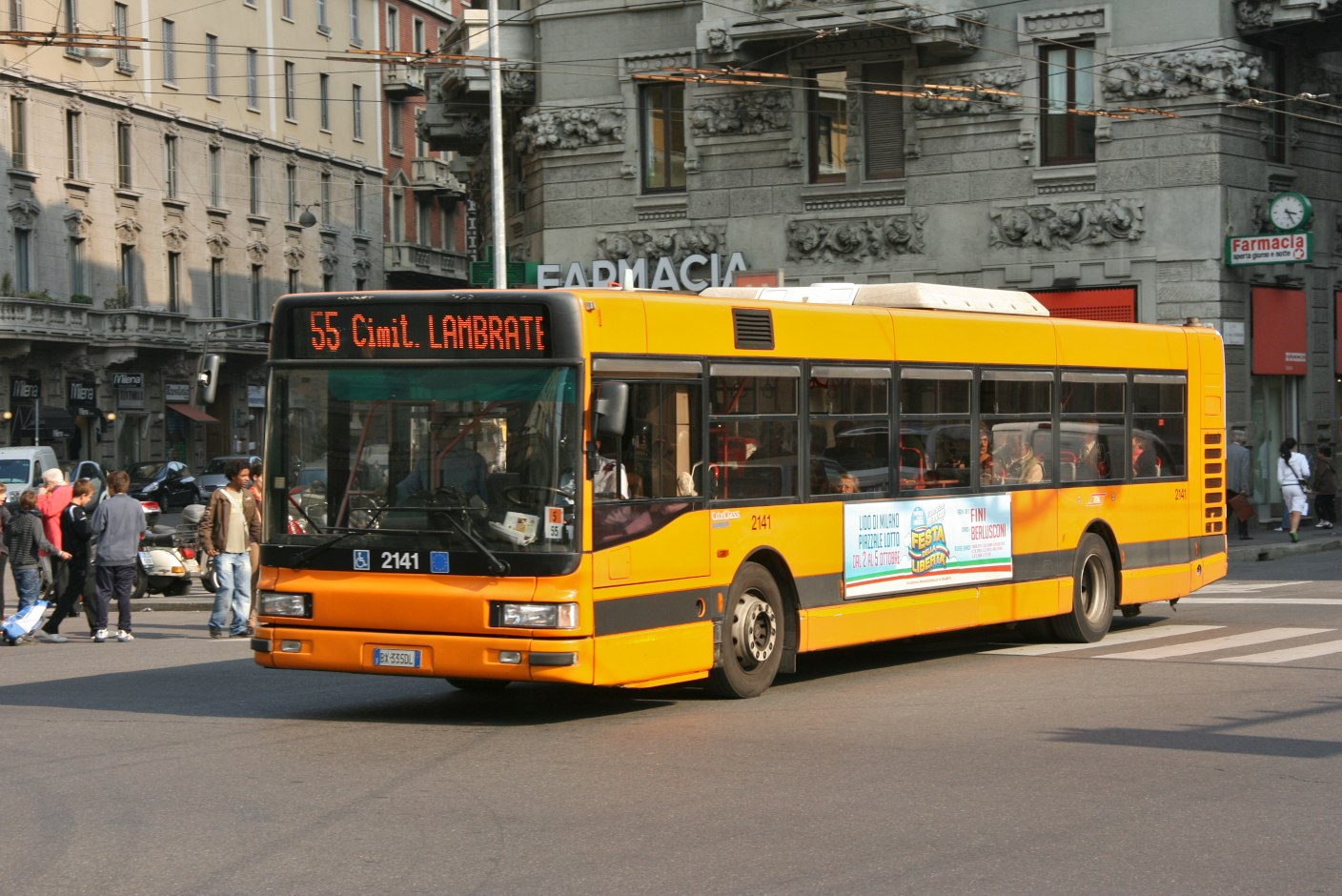
Iveco 491 CityClass bus (1996)

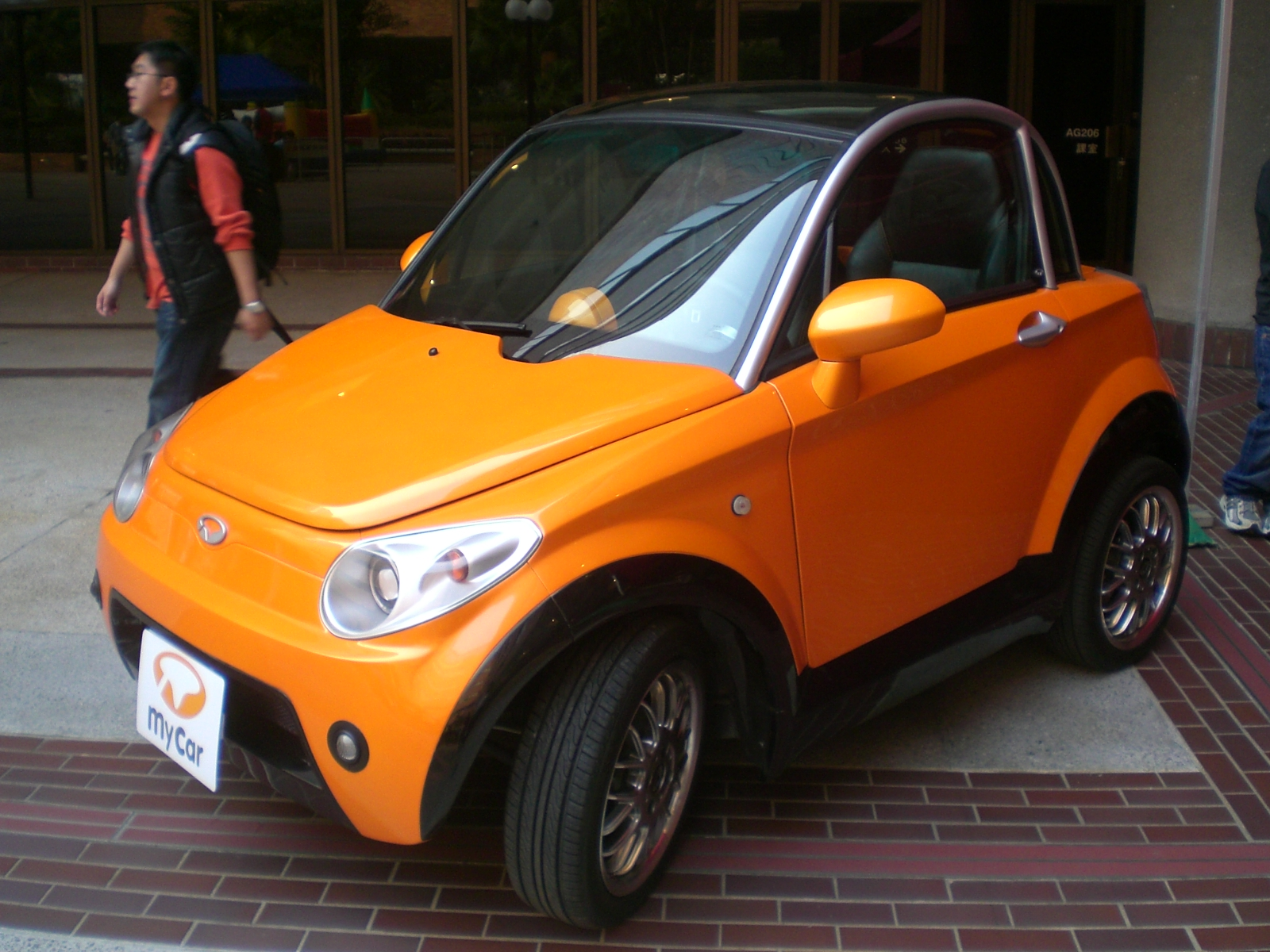
GTA MyCar, Neighborhood Electric Vehicle, GreenTech Automotive

Giugiaro's earliest cars, such as the Alfa Romeo 105/115 Series Coupés, often featured arched and curving shapes, similar to those found in the De Tomaso Mangusta, Iso Grifo, and Maserati Ghibli.

From the late 1960s, Giugiaro's designs became increasingly angular, transitioning via the gentle bends of the 1971 Maserati Bora, and culminating in the straight-lined, "folded paper" era of the 1970s and 1980s designs such as the 1974 first VW Golf, the 1976 Lotus Esprit S1, 1978 BMW M1, and the 1981 DMC DeLorean. During the early 1990s, he adapted to the era and introduced more curvaceous designs, exemplified by the Lamborghini Calà, Maserati Spyder, and Ferrari GG50.

Giugiaro is widely known for the DMC DeLorean, prominently featured in the Hollywood movie series Back to the Future. His most commercially successful design is the Volkswagen Golf Mk1.

In 1976, Giugiaro explored a taxi concept with the Museum of Modern Art (MOMA), which became the 1978 Lancia Megagamma concept. Fiat had commissioned the 1978 concept from Italdesign, asking for a 4-meter length, high roof, high h-point, multi-functional, monospace design — but ultimately decided the ides was too risky for production. In retrospect, the Megagamma was more influential than successful in its own right. It is considered the "conceptual birth mother of the MPV/minivan movement." It influenced the design of such mini/compact MPVs as the Nissan Prairie (1981) and Fiat 500L (2011), as well as larger MPVs, including the Renault Espace and Chrysler minivans.

=== Career and studios ===
Giugiaro began his career as a stylist in 1959 at the in-house Special Vehicle Design department of Italy's major carmaker, Fiat.

From 1959 until 1965, he worked in a similar capacity for Gruppo Bertone, a company exclusively working for other carmakers, primarily as a styling and design studio, similar to a building architecture firm, as well as handling low volume production of special edition cars for different carmakers. Although Bertone and Italy's other car and industrial design studios would create design proposals for other car brands on their own initiative, and sometimes even show concept cars under their own name, they never combined their design and production work for other carmakers with independent car manufacturing in their own right and under their own brand name, like Lotus in the UK, or Porsche in Germany.

In 1965, Giugiaro switched to working for Ghia, another of Italy's car design studios, through 1967. This experience was followed by a brief stint at Studi Italiani Realizzazione Prototipi (SIRP) in 1968, after which

In 1968, Giugiaro established his own studio, Italdesign Giugiaro. In 2015, he founded the design studio GFG Style in Turin with his son, Fabrizio Giugiaro, where he works to the present day.

== Designs ==
=== Automobiles ===
- Alfa Romeo
  - 2000 Sprint (1960)
  - 2600 Sprint (1962)
  - Giulia Sprint GT (1963)
  - Canguro concept car (1964)
  - Giulia SS Bertone Prototipo concept car (1965)
  - Alfa Romeo 1750 Berlinetta concept car (1968)
  - Iguana concept car (1968)
  - Caimano concept car (1971)
  - Alfasud (1972)
  - Alfetta GT (1974)
  - Alfasud Sprint (1976)
  - Brera concept car (2002, won Compasso d'Oro award)
  - Alfa Romeo 147 restyling (2004)
  - Alfa Romeo 156 restyling / facelift (second series) (2003)
  - Visconti concept car (2004)
  - 159/159 SW (2004)
  - Brera (2005)
- American Motors
  - AMC AMX/3 (1970)
  - Eagle Premier (1987)
- ASA 1000 GT (1962)
- Aston Martin
  - DB4 GT Bertone 'Jet' (1961)
  - Twenty Twenty concept car (2001)
- Audi
  - Audi 80 (1972)
  - Audi 80 (1978)
  - Audi Coupe
- BMW
  - 3200 CS (1961)
  - BMW 2800 Spicup concept car (initial design, 1969)
  - M1 (1977)
  - Nazca C2 concept car (1992)
  - Nazca C2 Spider concept car (1993)
  - M1 Homage Concept (2008)
- Bugatti Automobili and Bugatti Automobiles
  - ID 90 Concept (1990)
  - EB 112 (1993)
  - EB 118 (1998)
  - EB 218 (1999)
- Buick Park Avenue Ultra (1989–1990 interior seating)
- Cadillac Sixty Special (1989–1993 interior seating)
- Chevrolet Testudo concept car (1963)
- Daewoo
  - Lanos (1996)
  - Leganza (1997)
  - Magnus (2000 and 2003)
  - Kalos hatchback (2002)
  - Lacetti hatchback (2004)
- De Tomaso
  - Mangusta (1966)
  - Rowan concept car (1967)
- DMC DeLorean (1981)
- Ferrari
  - 250 GT “Competition” Berlinetta SWB Speciale Bertone (1960)
  - 250 GT Berlinetta SWB Speciale Bertone (1962)
  - Ferrari GG50 concept car (2005)
- Fiat
  - 850 Spider (1965)
  - Dino Coupé (initial design, 1963)
  - Panda (1980, won Compasso d'Oro award)
  - Uno (1983)
  - Croma (1985)
  - Punto (1993, won Compasso d'Oro award)
  - Palio/Siena (2001)
  - Croma 8V concept car (2005)
  - Croma (2005)
  - Grande Punto (2005)
  - Sedici (2005)
- Ford
  - Maya concept car (1984)
  - Mustang concept car (1966, 2006)
- FSO
  - Polonez (1978)
- GreenTech Automotive
  - GreenTech MyCar
- Gordon-Keeble GT (1960)
- Hyundai
  - Pony Coupé concept car (1974)
  - Pony (1975)
  - Stellar (1982)
  - Excel (1985)
  - Sonata (1988)
- Innocenti 186 GT (1964)
- Iso Rivolta
  - Rivolta IR 300 (1961)
  - Grifo (1963)
  - Fidia (1967)
- Italdesign
  - Aztec concept car (1988)
  - Quaranta concept car (2008)
- Isuzu
  - 117 Coupé (1968)
  - Piazza/Impulse (1981)
  - Gemini/I-Mark (1985)
- Iveco
  - Iveco CityClass bus (1996)
  - Iveco MyWay bus (1999)
  - Iveco Eurotech (1992)
  - Iveco EuroTrakker (1993)
  - Iveco Daily (2006)
  - Iveco Massif (2007)
- Lamborghini
  - Marco Polo concept car (1982)
  - Calà concept car (1995)
- Lancia
  - Megagamma concept car (1978)
  - Delta (1979)
  - Medusa concept car (1980)
  - Prisma (1982)
  - Orca concept car (1982)
  - Thema (1984)
- Lexus GS (1993)
- Lotus
  - Esprit (1976)
  - Etna concept car (1984)
- Maserati
  - 5000 GT (1961)
  - Ghibli (1966)
  - Simun concept car (1968)
  - Bora (1971)
  - Boomerang concept car (1972)
  - Merak (1972)
  - Tipo 124 concept car (1974)
  - Medici concept car (1974)
  - Medici II concept car (1976)
  - Quattroporte (1976)
  - 3200 GT (1998)
  - Buran concept car (2000)
  - Spyder (2001)
  - Coupé (2002)
- Mazda
  - Mazda Familia (1963)
  - Mazda Luce (1965)
- Oldsmobile Thor concept car (1967)
- Porsche Tapiro concept car (1970)
- Proton Emas concept car (2010)
- Renault
  - 21 (1986)
  - 19 (1988)
- Saab
  - 600 (1980)
  - 9000 (1984)
- Scania 2-series (1980)
- SEAT
  - Ibiza (1984)
  - Málaga (1985)
  - Proto T & TL concept car (1989–1990)
  - Proto C concept car (1990)
  - Toledo (1991)
  - Córdoba (1993)
  - Ibiza (1993)
  - Toledo (1998)
  - León (1998)
- Simca
  - Simca 1000 Coupé (1962)
  - Simca 1200S (1967)
- Skoda 720 concept car (1972)
- SsangYong
  - Rexton (2001)
  - Korando (2010)
- Subaru Alcyone SVX (1991)
- Suzuki
  - Carry (1969)
  - Cervo (1977–1982)
  - SX4 (2006)
- Techrules Ren (2018)
- Toyota
  - Aristo (1991)
  - Alessandro Volta concept car (2004)
- Volkswagen
  - Karmann Ghia TC (1972)
  - Passat (1973)
  - Scirocco (1974)
  - Golf (1974)
  - Jetta (1979)
  - W12 Coupe & Roadster concept cars (1997)
- Zastava
  - Florida (1988)

=== Cameras ===
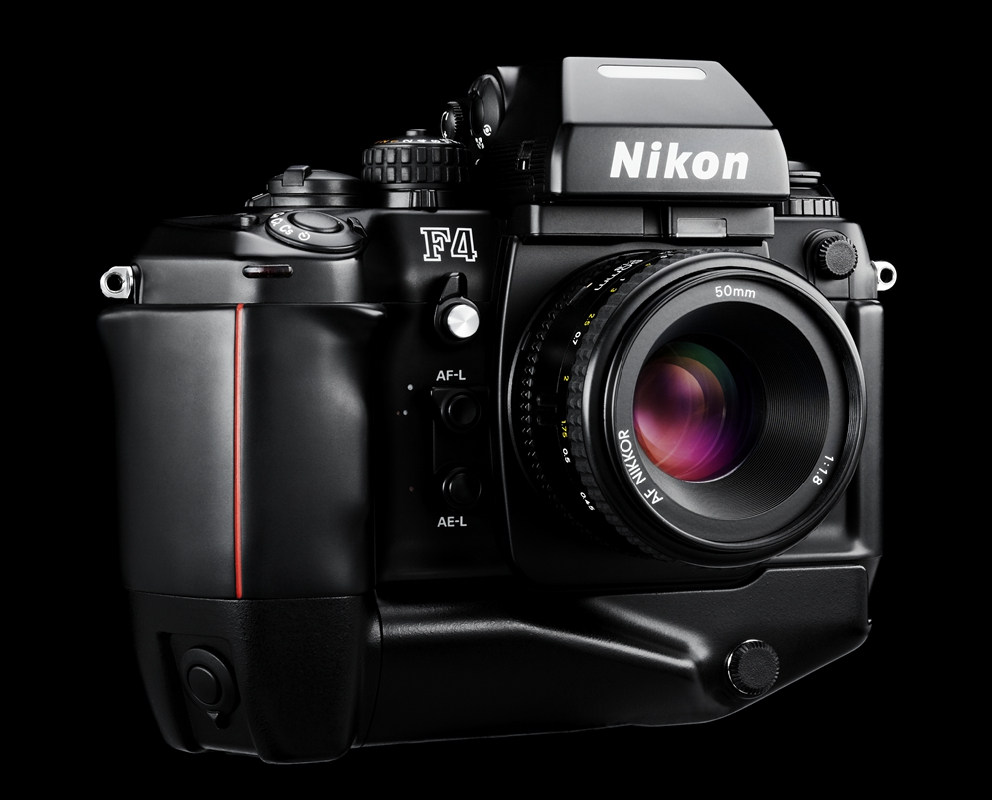
Nikon F4S Giugiaro Design

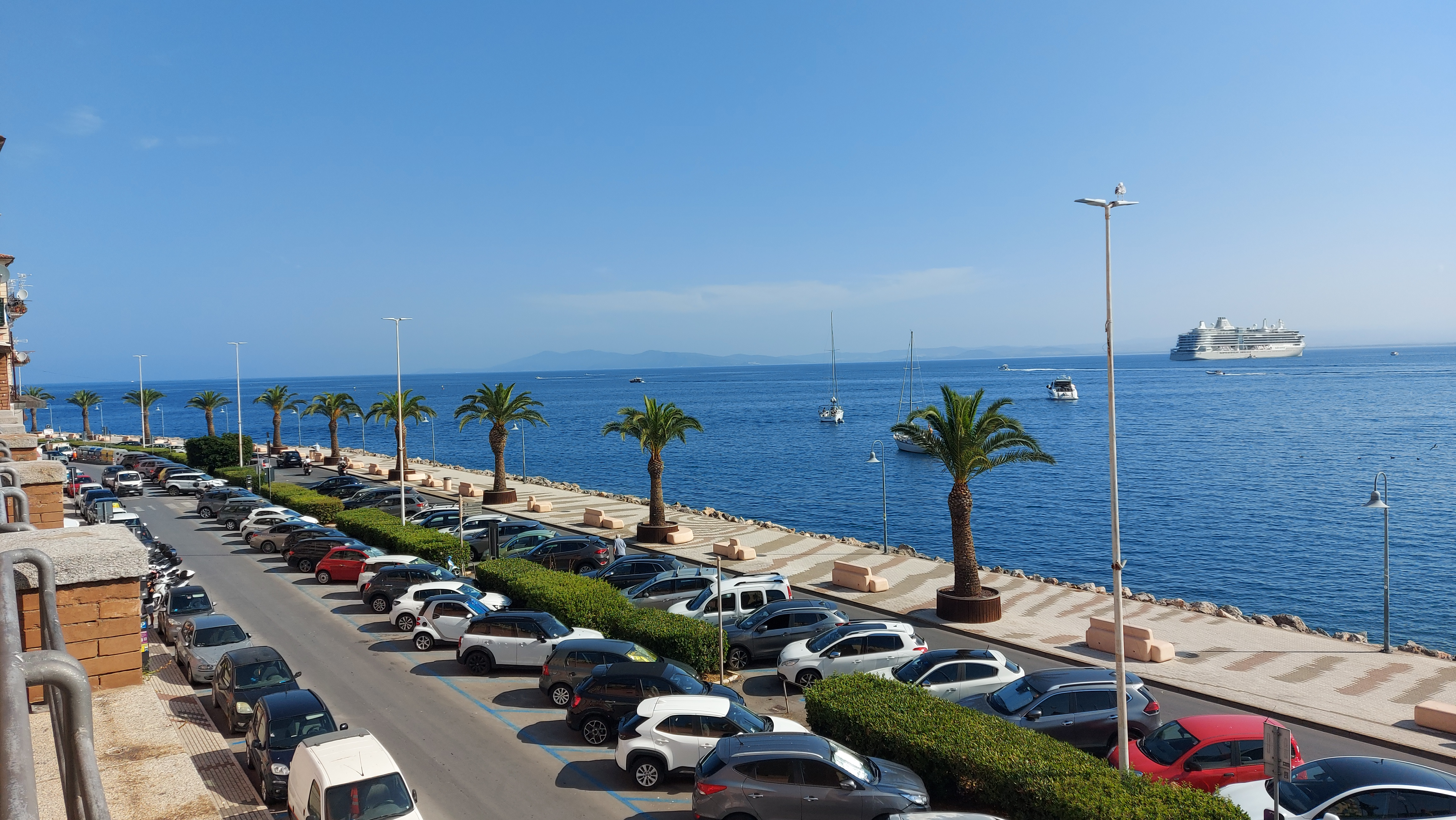
Navigation promenade of Porto Santo Stefano, Giugiaro Design, 1983

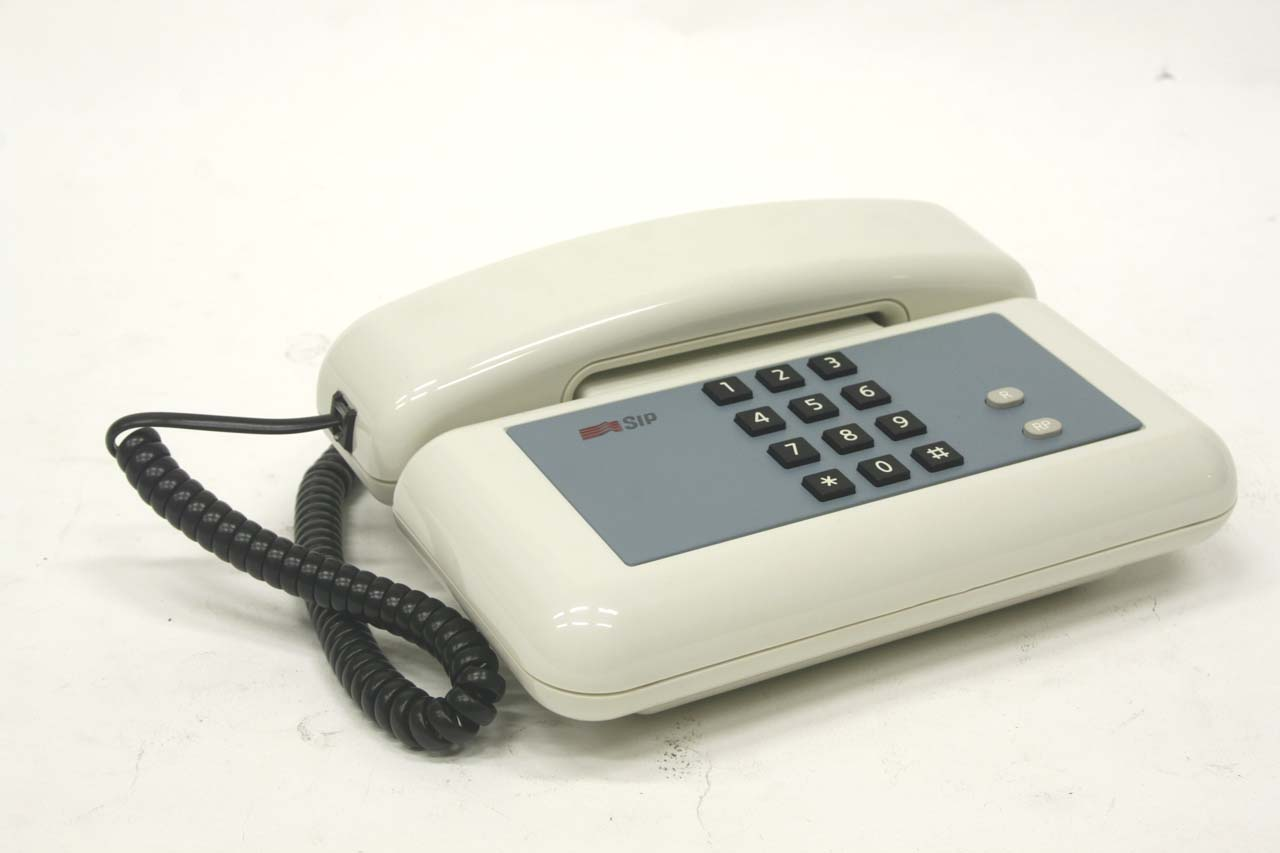
Sirio telephone (Museum of Science and Technology collection, Milan)

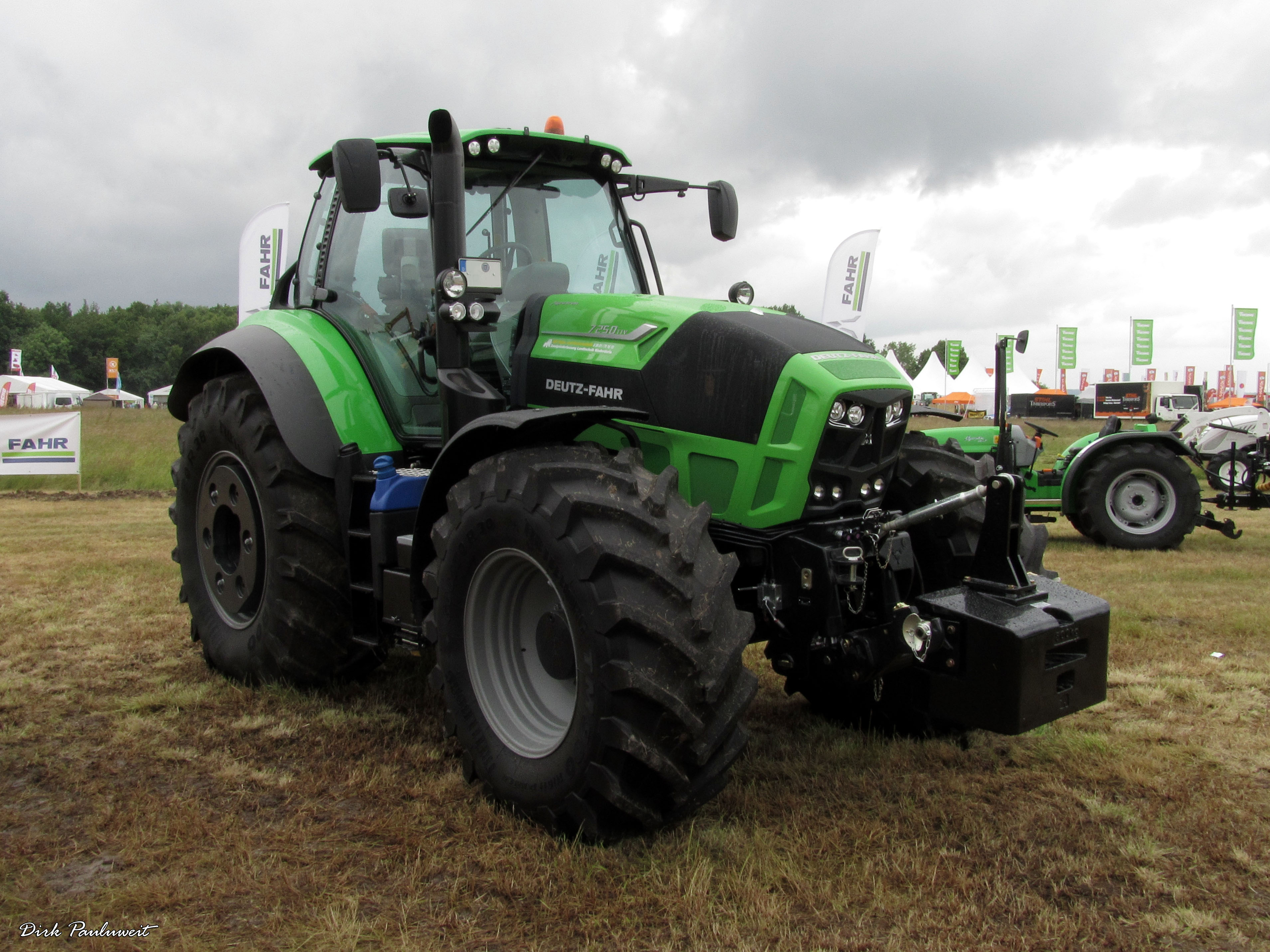
Compasso d'Oro award winning Deutz-Fahr 7250 TTV Agrotron

- Nikon
  - EM (1979)
  - F3 (1980)
  - L35AF (1983)
  - F4 (1988)
  - F5 (1996)
  - D2H (2003)
  - F6 (2004)
  - D3 (2007)
  - D4 (2012)
  - D800 (2012)
  - Df (2013)

=== Firearms ===
- Handguns
  - Beretta Neos (2002)
- Submachine Guns
  - Beretta CX4 Storm (2003)
- Shotguns
  - Beretta UGB25 Xcel Trap 12 GA, 30"

=== Motorcycles ===
- Ducati 860 GT (1975)
- Suzuki RE5 (1975)
- Derbi Predator (1998)
- TOMOS A5 Colibri (1989) moped
- MV Agusta 350 Ipotesi

=== Other ===
- Sirio telephone for Società Italiana per l'Esercizio Telefonico (early 1990s)
- FIAT Ferroviaria/Alstom ETR 460 (Pendolino) train (1993)
- Nitro concept tractor (2013)
- Seiko Sports watch (1983)
- Seiko Speed Master wrist watch (1986)
- Seiko Macchina Sportiva wrist watch
- Isotron by Eurodent, dental system (1989, won Compasso d'Oro award)
- Deutz-Fahr 7250 TTV Agrotron (2014, won Compasso d'Oro award)
- Deutz-Fahr 6215 RCSHIFT tractor (2017)
- Navigation promenade of Porto Santo Stefano, Tuscany
- Marille Pasta
- Organ of the cathedral of Lausanne, composed of about 7000 pipes
- Molten basketball design (official game ball for FIBA)
- Balsamic Vinegar of Modena Bottle
- Bridgestone Blouson bicycle (1985)
