= Afzal =

Afzal may refer to:

== Places in Iran ==
- Afzal, Iran, a village
- Chah Afzal, Yazd, a village

== People ==
=== First name ===
- Afzal Ansari (born 1953), Indian politician
- Afzal Hossain (born 1954), Bangladeshi actor, director, writer and painter
- Afzal Khan (British politician) (born 1958), British Labour Party politician
- Afzal Khan (general) (died 1659), a medieval Indian commander
- Afzal Khan (actor) (born 1969), better known as John Rambo, Pakistani actor and comedian
- Afzal Kahn (automotive designer) (born 1964), British automotive designer
- Afzal Guru or Mohammad Afzal (1969–2013), a Kashmiri terrorist, who was convicted for his role in the 2001 Indian Parliament attack
- Afzal Khokhar (born 1974), Pakistani politician
- Afzal Ahmed Syed (born 1946), Urdu poet and translator
- Afzal Sharif (born 1959), Bangladeshi television and film actor
- Afzal Tahir, (born 1949), Pakistani admiral, writer and military historian
- Afzal Yusuf, Indian music composer in the South Indian film industry

=== Middle name ===
- Muhammad Afzal Sindhu (born 1935), Pakistani politician and lawmaker who is a member of the National Assembly
- Nadeem Afzal Chan (born 1975), a.k.a. Nadeem Afzal Gondal, Pakistani politician
- Saira Afzal Tarar (born 1966), Pakistani politician and government minister

=== Surname ===
- Abdullah Afzal (born 1989), English actor and stand-up comedian of Pakistani British descent
- Fawzia Afzal-Khan (born 1958), university professor
- Nazir Afzal (born 1962), British lawyer who campaigns on issues around child sexual exploitation and violence against women
- Sahiba Afzal (born 1976), Pakistani film actress
- Syed Muhammad Afzal, Bengali politician
- Tanwir Afzal (born 1988), Hong Kong cricketer

== See also ==
- Articles beginning with "Afzal"
- Afzal Khan (disambiguation), several people
- Chah Afzal (disambiguation), various locations in Iran
- Mohammad Afzal (disambiguation), several people
