= Kahn Design =

British automobile modification company

A Kahn Design Limited
- Industry: Car modification
- Founded: 1998
- Headquarters: Bradford, England
- Key people: Afzal Kahn
- Number of employees: 60-80(2026)
- Subsidiaries: The Chelsea Truck Company, Racing Green, Kahn Automobiles
- Website: www.kahndesign.com

Kahn Design is a British-based company that specialises in the modification of motor vehicles. Founded by Afzal Kahn, the company has its headquarters in Bradford and showrooms in both Chelsea and Kensington in London.

Initially the company designed and sold alloy wheels, but in 2003 developed into car design modifications and coachbuilding. As of 2011, the company employs 80 people, including 20 designers.

== Work ==
Kahn, who has been called "the king of car customisation" by the automotive magazine, Autocar, pulled out of architecture to pursue his love for cars.

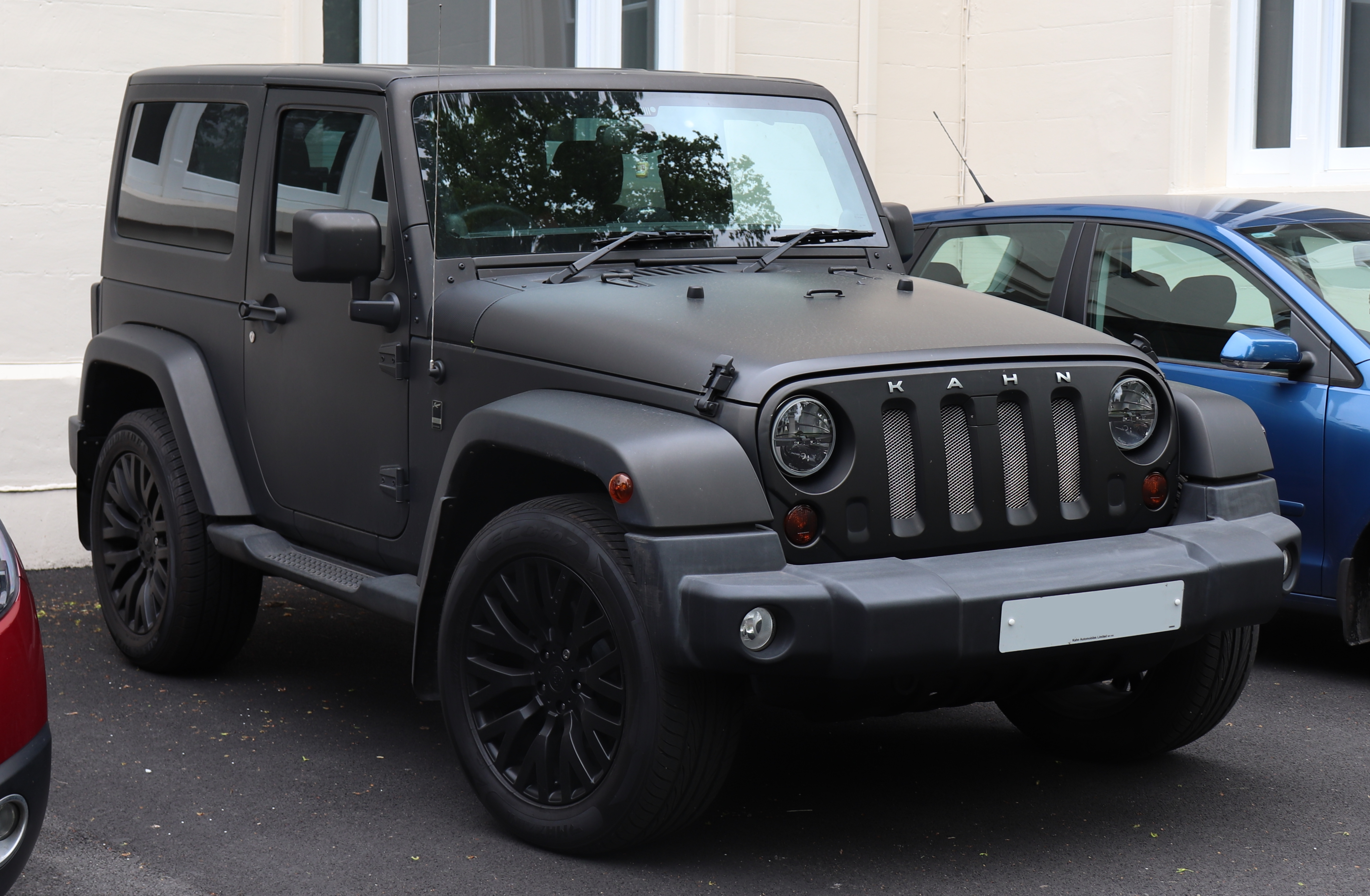
Kahn Design Jeep Wrangler Sahara

In 1996, Kahn designed the RS-R alloy wheel. The design, in which the spokes gave the appearance of continuing all the way to the rim was considered a first in the industry. Using capital derived from the initial sold-out production run of 1,000 RS-R wheels, Kahn founded A. Kahn Design in Bradford, West Yorkshire in the late 1990s.

Kahn continued in the role of creative director, releasing further wheel designs, and adding exterior styling and vehicle interior design to the company's product range. He also sought partnerships with other fashion brands to collaborate on the interior designs, such as Harris Tweed.

By 2002, Kahn Design had diversified into production of complete vehicle upgrades, necessitating a move to new, purpose-built premises in 2004, which incorporated body shop and leatherworking facilities. Kahn bought some Land Rovers and once the cars were in his studio he re-styled and re-engineered them.

In 2013, Kahn opened a showroom on the King's Road in Chelsea, London for his Chelsea Truck Company which specialised in customising Land Rover Defenders and Jeep Wranglers. This was followed by the launch of a flagship showroom on Kirkstall Road in Leeds. A second Kahn Design boutique in London was launched in October 2017 on Kensington High Street.

In 2014, Kahn moved into production of special edition vehicles, beginning with the release of a series of Land Rover Defender models under the Flying Huntsman brand, including extended bodywork, upgraded engine, suspension and braking systems and luxury interior design. The first two models to be announced, the 4x4 Huntsman 105 Longnose and the 6x6 Huntsman 110 Longnose, were revealed at the 2015 Geneva Motor Show.

In 2015, Kahn released official images of a new supercar, based on the Aston Martin DB9, entitled Vengeance. In development for close to six years, the body, made from aluminum, was crafted using traditional hammer-formed methods, with each vehicle built by Kahn's team of craftsmen and automotive experts. The vehicle was unveiled at the 2016 Geneva Motor Show. Following the WB12 Vengeance, the 2017 Geneva International Motor Show saw the unveiling of the Vengeance Volante, a convertible version of the WB12 model.

Officially unveiled at the 2016 Geneva International Motor Show, the Chelsea Truck Company Jeep Wrangler Black Hawk Edition has been described as a customised creation that combines glamorous finishes with bold body work.

In April 2017, Kahn unveiled the Project Kahn Range Rover Sport SVR Pace Car, a bespoke version of Land Rover's 542bhp V8 SUV edition.

In May 2017, it was announced, The London Taxi Company (LTC) had commissioned Kahn to create a run of bespoke versions of its TX4 cab, which will go out of production this year.

At the 2018 Geneva International Motor Show, Kahn unveiled the Chelsea Truck Company Defender-based 6X6 Civilian Carrier.

== See also ==
- Supercar Megabuild
