= Astro Fang: Super Machine =

1990 video game

- Japanese box art
- Developer(s): Soft Machine
- Publisher(s): A-Wave
- Composer(s): Akira Nakakuma
- Platform(s): Family Computer
- Release: JP: October 26, 1990
- Genre(s): Driving involving vehicular combat
- Mode(s): Single-player

Astro Fang: Super Machine (アストロ・ファング, Asutoro Fangu) is a Family Computer video game that was released for an exclusively Japanese market in 1990.

== Gameplay ==
Somewhere in the galaxy lies the planet RS-121 – a desolate planet that has suffered terrible disasters which made life impossible.

Only one construction still remains on the planet – a highway called the Black Line. It is said that an ancient legend is somehow connected to this highway. Players must knock enemies off the road by using missiles before they can knock him off the same highway. Automobile repair shops can be found where cars can be repaired and re-supplied with much-needed weapons. The playable vehicle resembles a 1982 DeLorean while the unplayable enemy vehicles resemble dune buggies.

The game has an infinite amount of continues and a meter appears on the bottom left-hand side of the screen to remind how close the player is to achieving the goal.

== Reception ==
Video Game Den gave Astro Fang: Super Machine a rating of 3 stars out of a possible 5 in their December 14, 2011 review.
