= Afzaal =

Afzaal is a surname. Notable people with the surname include:

- Aquib Afzaal (born 1985), English cricketer, brother of Kamran and Usman
- Kamran Afzaal (born 1973), Pakistani-born English cricketer
- Usman Afzaal (born 1977), Pakistani-born English cricketer

== See also ==
- Afzal (disambiguation)
