= Afzal Khan =

Afzal Khan may refer to:

- Afzal Khan (general) (died 1659), Bijapuri general
- Afzal Khan (footballer) (active 1943–1969), Pakistani half-back, manager and referee
- Afzal Khan (actor) (born 1966), Pakistani actor
- Afzal Khan Shirazi, Mughal administrator and prime minister
- Mir Afzal Khan, former Pakistani politician
- Afzal Khan Lala (1926–2015), Pashtun nationalist
- Afzal Khan (British politician) (born 1958), UK Member of Parliament and former Member of the European Parliament
- Afzal Rahman Khan (1921–2005), Pakistan Navy admiral and politician
- Afzal Khan Khattak, Pashtun chief of the Khattak tribe
- Afzal Kahn (automotive designer) (born 1964), British automotive designer
- Afzal H. Khan, Bangladesh politician
