= Mohammad Afzal =

Mohammad Afzal is the name of:

- Mawlawi Mohammad Afzal (c. 1925–2012), jihadi leader of Nuristan in the 1980s and 1990s
- Mohammad Afzal (Emirati cricketer) (born 1973), Emirati cricketer
- Mohammad Afzal (Hyderabad cricketer) (born 1955), Pakistani cricketer of the 1970s and 1980s
- Mohammad Afzal (Multan cricketer) (born 1955), Pakistani cricketer of the 1980s and 1990s
- Mohammad Afzal (politician) (1913–2008), Pakistani politician and judge
- Mohammad Afzal Guru (1969–2013), Kashmiri convicted of participating in the 2001 attacks on the Indian Parliament
- Mohammad Afzal Khan (1811–1867), Emir of Afghanistan
- Mohammad Anwar Afzal (born 1926), Afghan footballer

== See also ==
- Muhammad Afzal (disambiguation)
