= DMC DeLorean =

1980s automobile

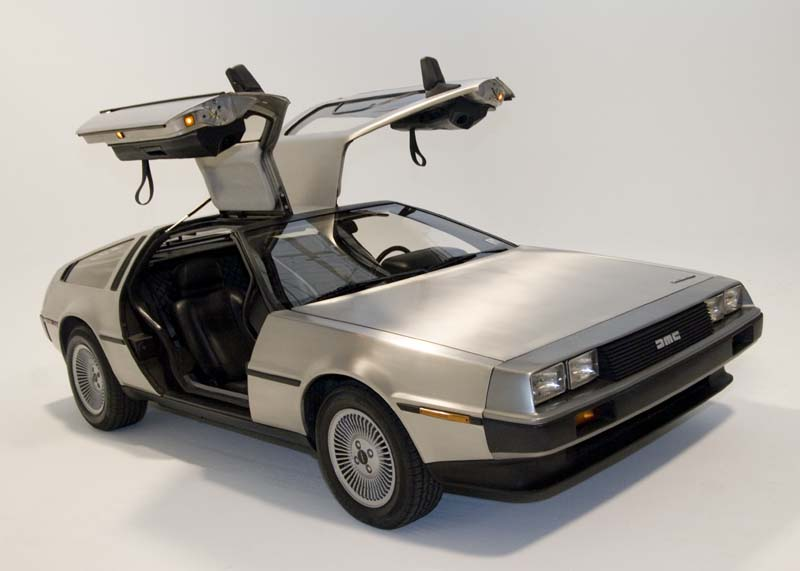
- 1983 DeLorean

Overview
- Manufacturer: DeLorean Motor Company (DMC)
- Production: January 21, 1981 – December 24, 1982
- Model years: 1981–1983
- Assembly: Northern Ireland: Dunmurry (DeLorean Motor Cars, Ltd.)
- Designer: Giorgetto Giugiaro at Italdesign

Body and chassis
- Class: Sports car
- Body style: 2-door coupé
- Layout: Rear-engine, rear-wheel-drive
- Doors: Gull-wing

Powertrain
- Engine: 2.85 L (2,849 cc; 173.86 cu in) PRV ZMJ-159 V6
- Power output: 130 hp (132 PS; 97 kW) and 153 lb⋅ft (207 N⋅m) of torque
- Transmission: 5-speed manual 3-speed automatic

Dimensions
- Wheelbase: 2,413 mm (95.0 in)
- Length: 4,267 mm (168.0 in)
- Width: 1,988 mm (78.3 in)
- Height: 1,140 mm (44.9 in) doors closed 1,962 mm (77.2 in) doors open
- Curb weight: 1,233 kg (2,718 lb)

The DMC DeLorean is a rear-engine, two-seat sports car manufactured and marketed by John DeLorean's DeLorean Motor Company (DMC) for the American market from 1980 until 1982—ultimately the only car brought to market by the fledgling company. The DeLorean is sometimes referred to by its internal pre-production designation, DMC-12, although this was not used in sales or marketing materials for the production model.

Designed by Giorgetto Giugiaro, the DeLorean is noted for its gull-wing doors and brushed stainless-steel outer body panels, as well as its relatively modest performance. It uses the V6 PRV engine used in Peugeot, Renault, and Volvo Cars.

With the first production car announced on January 21, 1981, the design incorporated numerous minor revisions to the hood, wheels and interior before production ended in late December 1982, shortly after DMC filed for bankruptcy. Total production reached an estimated 9,000 units. Though its production was short-lived, the DeLorean became widely known after it was featured as the time machine in the Back to the Future films.

Despite acquiring a reputation for poor build quality and an unsatisfactory driving experience, the DeLorean continues to have a strong following. 6,500 DeLoreans were estimated to still be on the road as of 2015.

== History ==
In 1973, John DeLorean left General Motors and formed his own car company, the DeLorean Motor Company. Its first vehicle was to be a 2-seat coupe-body sports car.

When details surrounding the DeLorean were first announced in the mid-1970s, there were rumors that the DeLorean would incorporate advanced features, such as a plastic unibody chassis produced using Elastic Reservoir Molding (ERM), (Note: Similar to the chassis design used in the Vega-based XP-898 concept car), a mid-engine layout, a driver-side airbag, 10-mph bumpers, and ultrawide (195/50VR-15 front and 265/50VR-16 rear) Pirelli P7 tires that enabled the car to achieve 0.9g of lateral acceleration; none of these would materialize in the production vehicle.

Stainless steel was chosen for the outer surfaces primarily due to a paint-finish problem with ERM. Rather than trying to solve the painting, John DeLorean chose to use stainless skin. The increased cost of using stainless steel was offset by deducting the normal cost of painting a vehicle. Allegheny Ludlum built promotional vehicles for Ford in the 1970s using stainless steel and based on those cars, John DeLorean and chief engineer Bill Collins chose to use stainless steel instead of aluminum.

Originally, the car was intended to have a centrally-mounted Wankel rotary engine. The engine selection was reconsidered when Comotor production ended and the favored engine became the Ford Cologne V6 engine. The Ford V6 engine would soon be abandoned in favor of the complete drivetrain from the Citroën CX 2000—deemed a more reliable choice. The 1,985 cc (121 cu in) inline-four engine from Citroën was ultimately deemed underpowered for the DeLorean. When Citroën learned of DMC plans to turbocharge the engine, Citroën suggested that DMC find another engine. Eventually the fuel-injected V6 PRV engine was selected. As a result, the engine location had to be moved from the mid-engined location in Prototype-1 to a rear-engined location in Prototype-2, a configuration which would be retained in the production vehicle.

The chassis was initially planned to use ERM, which would lighten the car and lower its production costs. DeLorean had purchased patent rights to the essentially untested ERM technology, but it was eventually found to be unsuitable.

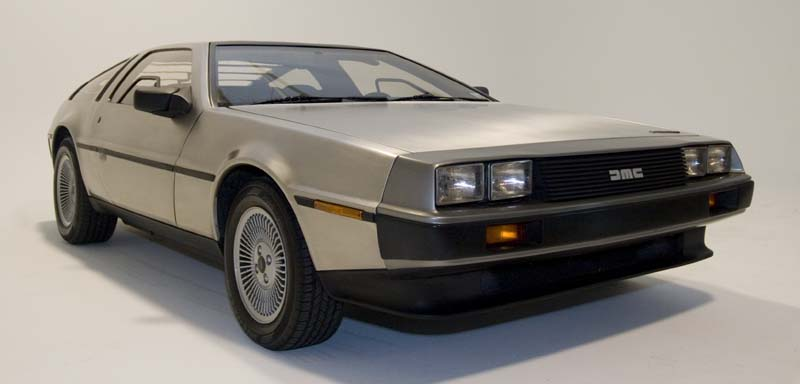
A DeLorean with the doors closed

Appearing in October 1976, the first prototype was completed by chief engineer Bill Collins. The prototype was initially known as the DSV-1, or DeLorean Safety Vehicle. As development continued, the model was referred to as the DSV-12, before changing to DMC-12, the "12" deriving from the target list price of $12,000. Prototype-1's interior was significantly different from the production vehicle's. Prototype-1 had a prominent full-width knee bar, as it was intended to be a safety car. A medium brown leather covered the seats, but they were much flatter and did not have the comfort and support of the production seats. A black steering wheel with a fat center was intended to hold an airbag and the driver had a full set of Stewart-Warner gauges which included a central warning system that would check various fluid levels and even warn of low brake pad thickness though, even at this time, it was suspected that production cars would not have this feature.

These and other changes to the original concept led to considerable schedule pressures. The design was deemed to require almost complete re-engineering, which was turned over to English engineer Colin Chapman, founder of Lotus Cars. Chapman replaced most of the unproven material and manufacturing techniques with those then employed by Lotus, including a steel backbone chassis.

A small number of pre-production DeLoreans were produced with fiberglass bodies and are referred to as "black cars" or mules and were used by Lotus during development and engineering. After several delays and cost overruns, production at the Dunmurry factory in Northern Ireland, located a few miles from Belfast City Centre, finally began in late 1980. DMC changed the name DMC-12 on its now $25,000 car in favor of the model name DeLorean. The DeLorean sports car, as it was described in advertisements, began production in December 1980 with the first production car announced on January 21, 1981. (Note: The first production DeLorean (VIN 500) is on display at the Crawford Auto-Aviation Museum)

The DeLorean Motor Company was placed into receivership in February 1982 and filed bankruptcy on October 26 of that year, just a few days after the arrest of its founder, John DeLorean, on drug-trafficking charges. Consolidated International purchased the unsold DeLoreans and partially completed DeLoreans still on the assembly line and assembled approximately 100 cars to finish the remaining production on December 24, 1982.

== Sales and production ==
=== Sales ===
DeLorean logo

Prior to the release of the DeLorean, there was a waiting list of eager buyers, many of whom paid over manufacturers suggested retail price (MSRP). However, that exuberance subsided very quickly and production output soon far exceeded sales volume. October 1981 was the highest month of sales for DMC with 720 vehicles sold but by December, the US was falling into recession and interest rates were rising which further negatively impacted sales. Despite this, instead of reducing production, John DeLorean doubled production output, further adding to the inventory of unsold cars. By the end of 1981, DMC had produced 7,500 cars but had sold only 3,000. By this point, DMC was in a financial hardship having sold only 350 units in January 1982 and in February of that year, DMC was placed into receivership.

In February 1982, unsold 1981 model year cars were "priced for immediate clearance" in hopes to make room for the more expensive 1982 model year cars. (Note: DMC raised the MSRP of 1982 models by $4,825.) In March, telegrams were sent to all 343 dealerships requesting each buy six cars to help save the company; none of the dealers responded with a sales order. By this point, dealerships and the quality assurance centers were sitting on unsold inventory and hundreds more were sitting on the docks in Long Beach, California. By the end of May 1982, production at the factory was shut down. Another attempt in July 1982 was made to revive sales by offering discounts to dealerships and offering a 5-year/50,000-mile (80,000 km) warranty with the first year or 12,000-mile (19,000 km) portion secured by a major insurance carrier, but this was not successful.

After resigning his position, Bruce McWilliams, VP of Marketing for DMC and later acting President for DMC America, said, "The car could never be sold in the numbers John DeLorean predicted".

=== Production quantity ===
Production information was lost or scattered upon the shutdown of DMC and production figures for the DeLorean were never verified based on official factory records. Owners have been able to piece together the approximate quantity of DeLoreans produced from vehicle identification number (VIN) information, despite some unexplained VIN gaps. Beginning in February 1982, the factory operated at a reduced production rate until the end of May that year. When Consolidated International acquired the unsold and partially assembled cars in November 1982, it brought back workers to complete the cars remaining on the assembly line. It was decided to make the remaining completed 1982 model year cars into 1983 models. The remaining cars' VINs were re-VINed into 1983 cars by taking the original VIN and adding 5000 to it and changing the "CD" in the middle of the VIN to "DD" thus making a 1983 model. For the 1981 model year, there were 6,700 DeLoreans produced (VIN 500–7199). For the 1982 model year, there were an estimated 1,999 DeLoreans produced (VIN 10001–11999). For the 1983 model year, there were an estimated 276 DeLoreans (VIN 17000–17170 and 20001–20105) produced, bringing total production to an estimated 8,975 cars. (Note: Production capacity is disputed. Some sources indicate 8,875, some indicate 8,987, some say 9,080.)

== Construction ==
The DeLorean features a number of unusual construction details, including gull-wing doors, unpainted stainless-steel body panels, and a rear-mounted engine.

=== Body ===
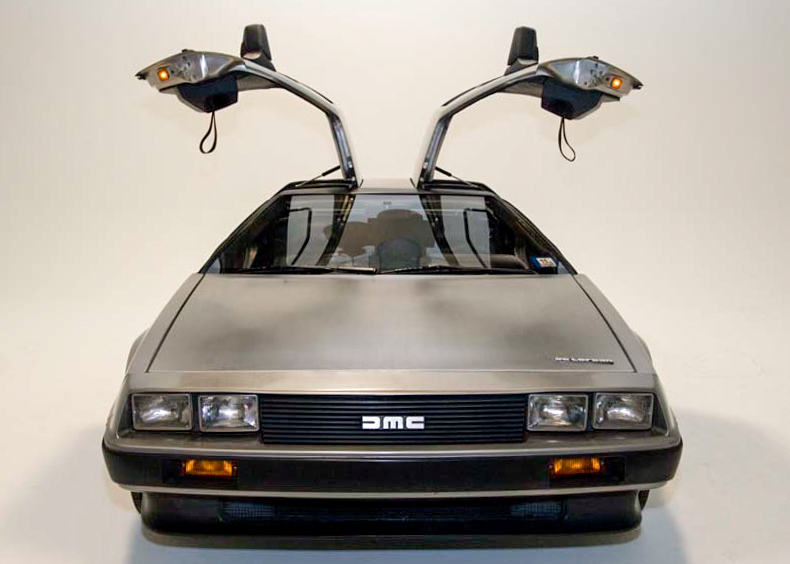
The gull-wing doors on the DeLorean were a distinctive feature.

The body design of the DeLorean was a product of Giorgetto Giugiaro of Italdesign. To create the car, Giugiaro drew on one of his previous works, the Porsche Tapiro, a concept car from 1970. The body is paneled in brushed austenitic SAE 304 stainless steel, and except for three cars plated in 24-karat gold, all DeLoreans left the factory uncovered by paint or clearcoat. Painted DeLoreans do exist, although these were all painted after the cars were purchased from the factory.

The stainless-steel panels are fixed to a fiberglass underbody. The underbody is affixed to an epoxy-coated steel backbone chassis with Y-frames at either end, derived from the Lotus Esprit platform.

Another distinctive feature of the DeLorean is its gull-wing doors. The DeLorean features heavy doors supported by cryogenically-preset torsion bars and nitrogen-charged struts that were developed by Grumman Aerospace. The doors featured red and amber lights to mark their edges at night and small cutout windows, because full-sized windows would not be fully retractable within the short door panels. Although early-production cars had fitment problems due to faulty striker plates and issues with weather seals, these were mostly tolerated because the attention-getting doors allowed occupants to enter and exit the car in tight parking places.

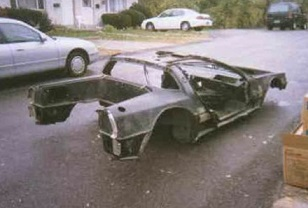
DeLorean fiberglass underbody

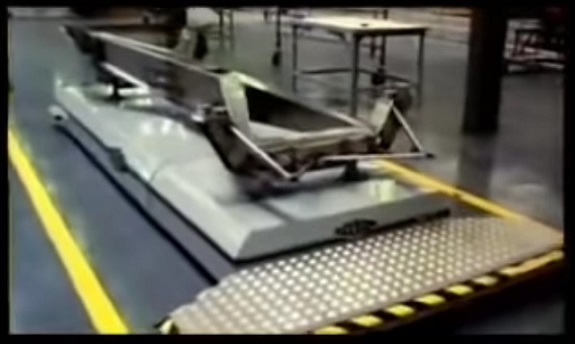
DeLorean chassis

=== Engine and drivetrain ===
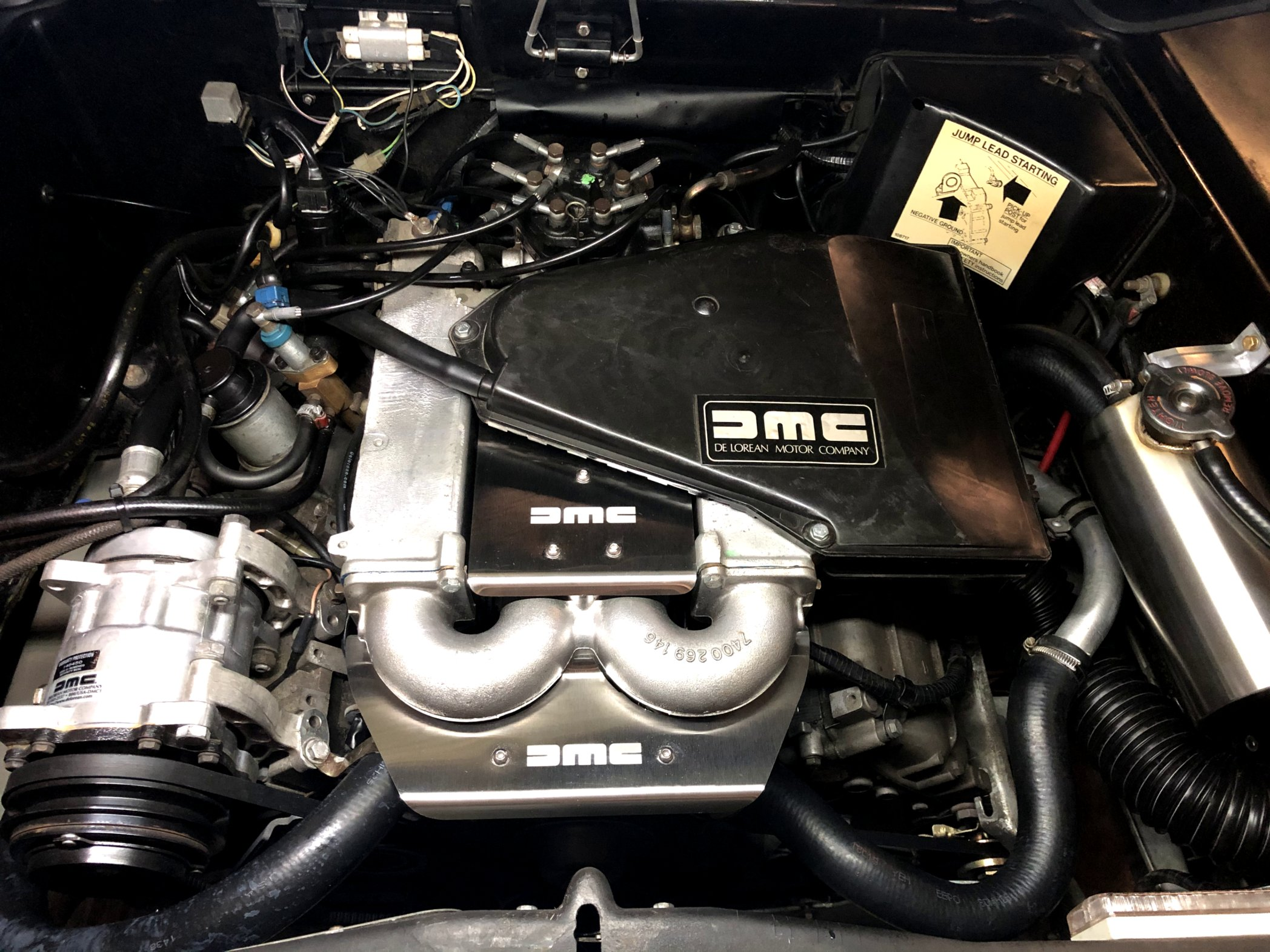
Modified DeLorean PRV engine in VIN 1522

The DeLorean's engine is a 2.85 L (2,849 cc; 173.86 cu in) single overhead camshaft (PRV) V6 engine. The catalyst-equipped PRV engine in the DeLorean engine is derated to 130 hp (132 PS; 97 kW) at 5,500 rpm and torque of 153 lb⋅ft (207 N⋅m) at 2,750 rpm. A handful of DeLoreans that stayed in Europe were allowed to keep their 154 hp (156 PS; 115 kW) rating. These PRVs were a development of the 2.7-litre V6 used in the Renault 30 that were designed and built under special contract with the DeLorean Motor Company.

This engine has a 90° layout with a light-alloy block with cast-iron cylinder liners and light-alloy heads with crossflow cylinder heads and hemispherical combustion chambers. It is cooled by a front-mounted radiator with twin-thermostatically controlled electric cooling fans. The engine has a 91 mm (3.6 in) bore and 73 mm (2.9 in) stroke, a compression ratio of 8.8:1 and is fitted with a Bosch K-Jetronic fuel injection system.

Two transmissions were available for the DeLorean: a 5-speed manual and a 3-speed automatic, both with a final drive ratio of 3.44:1.

=== Suspension and wheels ===
The DeLorean has a four-wheel independent suspension with coil springs, and telescopic shock absorbers. The front suspension uses double wishbones, while the rear is a multi-link setup. The DeLorean is a rear-engine vehicle with a 35%–65% front–rear weight distribution.

When the DeLorean first arrived in the US, the car had a higher-than-expected wheel gap in the front suspension. Due to the various bumper regulation changes throughout the 1970s and early 1980s, some attributed the nose-high look being related to a last-minute change in US bumper height requirements however, this is not true. The nose-high appearance is a result of poor quality springs. Despite having significantly less weight in the front, the front and rear springs had the same spring rate and used lower-quality steel, which resulted in the nose-high look.

Steering is rack and pinion, with an overall steering ratio of 14.9:1, giving 2.65 turns lock-to-lock and a 35-foot (11 m) curb-to-curb turning circle. DeLoreans are equipped with cast alloy wheels, that are staggered in dimension, matching the car's wedge-shape, measuring 14 inches (360 mm) in diameter by 6 inches (150 mm) wide on the front and 15 inches (380 mm) in diameter by 8 inches (200 mm) wide on the rear. These were fitted with 195/60-14 (front) and 235/60-15 (rear) Goodyear NCT steel-belted radial tires.

The DeLorean features power-assisted disc brakes on all wheels, with 10-inch (250 mm) rotors in front and 10.5-inch (270 mm) in the rear.

== Technical data ==
DMC DeLorean technical summary
Feature	Detail
Engine	
Engine:	PRV "Douvrin" V6
Type:	light-alloy 90° V6 with overhead camshafts
Displacement:	2.85 L (2,849 cc; 173.86 cu in)
Bore × Stroke:	91 mm × 73 mm (3.58 in × 2.87 in)
Compression ratio:	8.8:1
Maximum power:	130 bhp (97 kW) at 5500 rpm
Maximum torque:	162 ft⋅lb (220 N⋅m) at 2750 rpm
Valvetrain:	Single overhead camshaft (SOHC), 2 overhead valves per cylinder
Induction:	Bosch K-Jetronic mechanical fuel injection
Ignition:	breakerless, electronic Bosch
Cooling:	Water-cooled with twin thermostatically-controlled electric cooling fans
Emission control:	Lambda Sond/catalytic, unleaded fuel
Drivetrain
Transmission:	5-speed Renault 369-08 manual 3-speed Renault Type 4141 automatic
Body & chassis
Body/Chassis:	304 brushed stainless steel over fiberglass body / epoxy-coated steel backbone chassis
Suspension
Suspension front:	Upper wishbone, lower box-section lateral arm, anti-roll bar as compliance link, coil spring over telescopic shock absorber
Suspension rear:	Upper and lower lateral links, box-section semi-trailing arm, coil spring over telescopic shock absorber
Steering
Steering:	Manual rack and pinion
Turns lock-to-lock:	3.2
Brakes
Brakes f/r:	10 in (254 mm) discs / 10.5 in (267 mm) discs — vacuum assist
Wheels/Tires
Wheels f/r:	14 x 6 in (357mm x 152mm) / 15 x 8 in (381mm x 203mm)
Tires f/r:	steel belted radial, 195/60HR-14 / 235/60HR-15 Goodyear NCT; T125/70-15 (spare)
Dimensions & capacities
Wheelbase:	94.8 in (2,408 mm)
Track f/r:	1,590 / 1,588 mm (62.6 / 62.5 in)
Length; Width; Height:	168.0 in (4,267 mm); 78.3 in (1,990 mm); 44.9 in (1,140 mm)
Weight:	2,840 lb (1,288 kg)
Fuel capacity:	13.6 U.S. gal (51.6 L)
Luggage capacity:	14.0 cu ft (396 L)
Weight distribution:	35% front / 65% rear

== Production changes ==
Although there were no typical yearly updates to the DeLorean, several changes were made to the DeLorean during production. Instead of making changes at the end of the model year, DMC implemented changes mid-production. This resulted in no clear distinction between the 1981, 1982, and 1983 model years, but with subtle changes taking place almost continuously throughout the production run.

=== Hood styles ===
The original hood of the DeLorean had grooves running down both sides. It included a fuel filler flap to simplify fuel filling. These cars typically had a locking fuel cap to prevent fuel tampering or theft by siphoning. In August 1981, the fuel flap was removed from the hood (although the hood creases remained). After the supply of locking caps was exhausted, the company switched to a non-locking fuel cap (resulting in at least 500 cars with no hood flap, but with locking fuel caps). The final styling for the hood included the addition of a cast-metal DeLorean emblem in the lower right corner and the removal of the grooves, resulting in a completely flat hood. This final version was on all 1982–1983 model year vehicles.

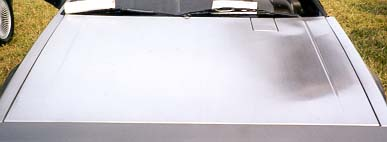
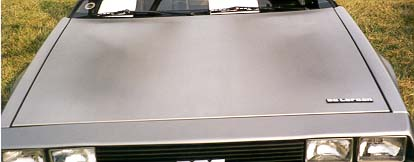
Side-by-side comparison of an early 1981 hood (left) vs. a later model 1983 hood (right)

=== Other changes ===
Although the styling of the DeLorean's wheels remained unchanged, the wheels of early 1981 models were painted grey. These wheels sported matching grey center caps with an embossed DMC logo. Early into the 1981 production run, these were changed to a polished silver look, with a contrasting black center cap. The embossed logo on the center caps was painted silver to add contrast.

Closing the door from the inside can be achieved by using a grab handle. For people with shorter arms, DMC installed leather pull straps attached to the grab handle. Beginning with late-model 1981 cars, DMC revised the location of the leather pull strap to be centrally mounted and integrated into the lower door panel. The rear trim panel has an armrest extension that is visibly two separate pieces on early 1981 models; this armrest has a tendency to break loose as people get in and out of the vehicle. In late 1981, this was resolved by having the armrest extension integrated into the rear trim panel, the assembly wrapped in vacuum-formed vinyl. The small sun visors on the DeLorean have vinyl on one side and headliner fabric on the other side. Originally these were installed such that the headliner side would be on the bottom when not in use. Later on in 1981, they were reversed so that the vinyl side would be on the bottom.

Three styles of AM/FM radio with cassette were used by DMC during production. The first two styles were manufactured by Craig. Since the original Craig radio did not have a built-in clock, one was installed in front of the gear shift on the console. The second Craig radio featured an on-board clock, the clock on the console was removed at the same time. The third radio manufactured by Audio Systems Incorporated (ASI), which had a DMC logo on the cassette tape door, was used on late 1982 models and all 1983 models. The first 2,200 cars produced used a windshield-embedded antenna. This type of antenna proved to be unsuitable with poor radio reception. Oftentimes the radio would continually "seek", attempting to find a signal. A standard whip antenna, which was later changed to a manually-retractable antenna, was added to the outside of the front right fender. Despite improving radio reception, this resulted in a hole in the stainless steel, and an unsightly antenna. As a result, the antenna was again moved. The final antenna was an automatic retractable version installed under the rear induction grille behind the rear driver's-side window.

The original 80-amp Ducellier alternator supplied with the early-production DeLoreans could not provide enough current to supply the car when all lights and electrical options were on; as a result, the battery would gradually discharge, leaving the driver stranded on the road. This happened to DeLorean-owner and DMC investor Johnny Carson shortly after he was presented with the vehicle. Beginning with cars built in late 1981, DeLoreans were fitted from the factory with a 90-amp Motorola alternator, which solved this problem.

There were other minor changes throughout the production run that saw revisions in carpeting, automatic transmission shift knobs, exhaust tips and more.

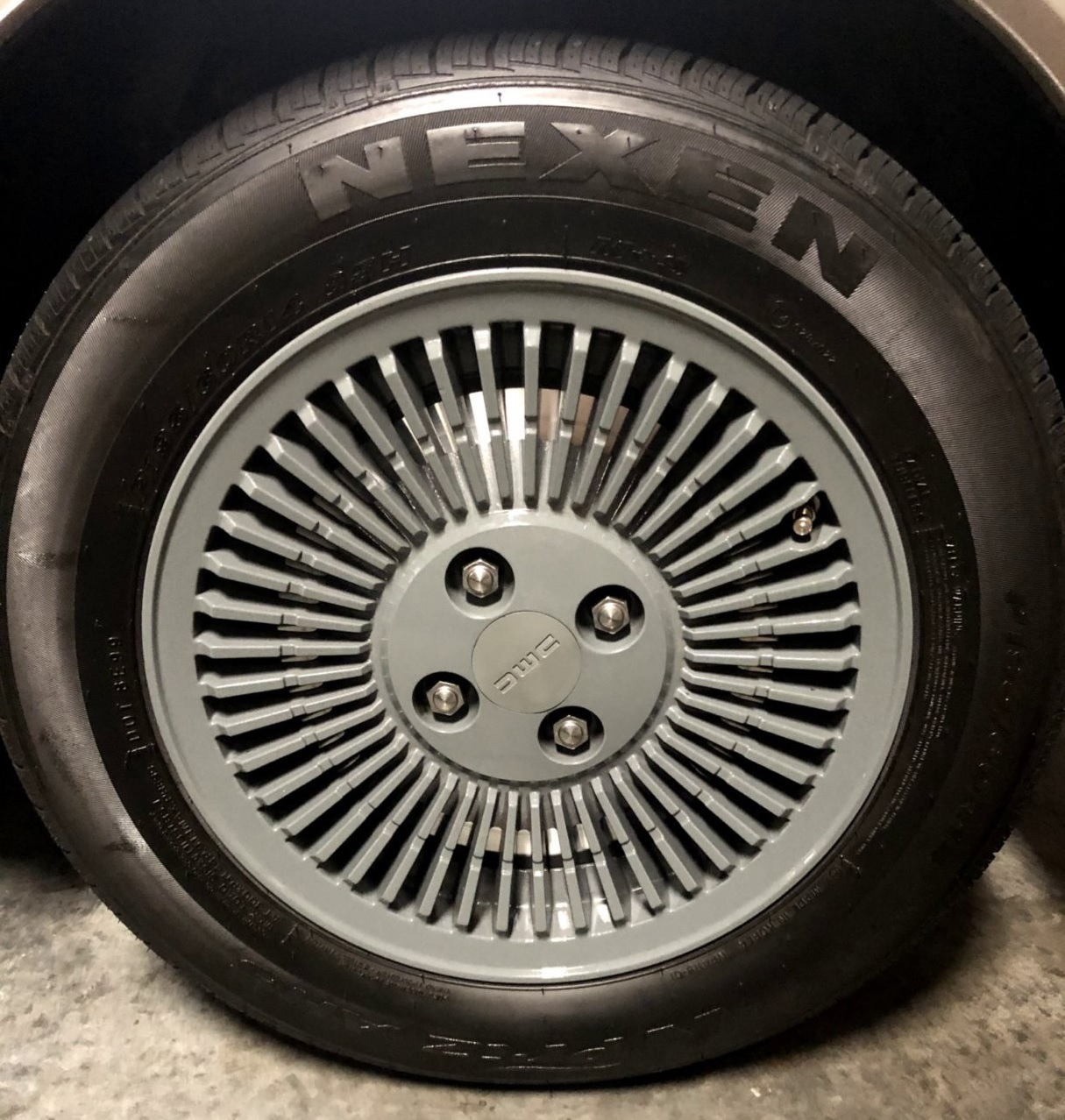
Early-1981 dark grey wheel

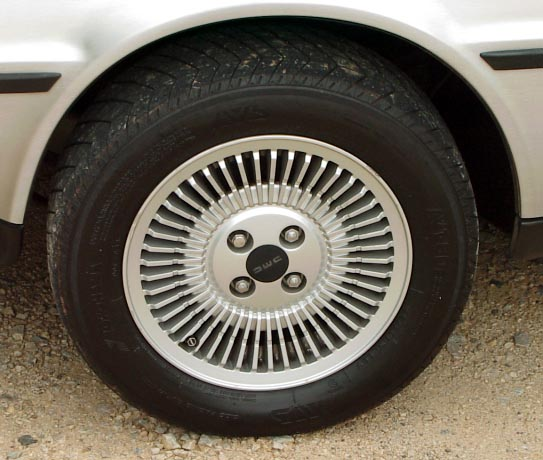
Mid-1981 silver wheel

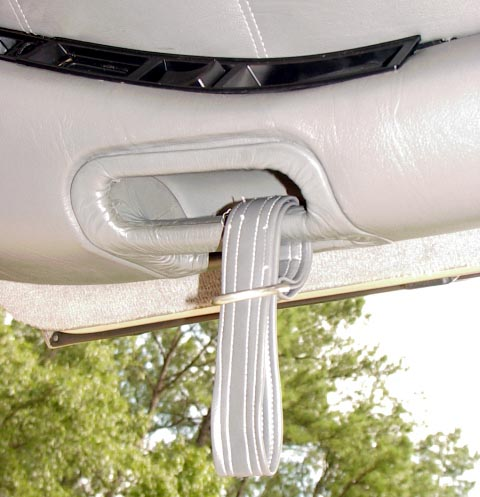
Early-style pull strap

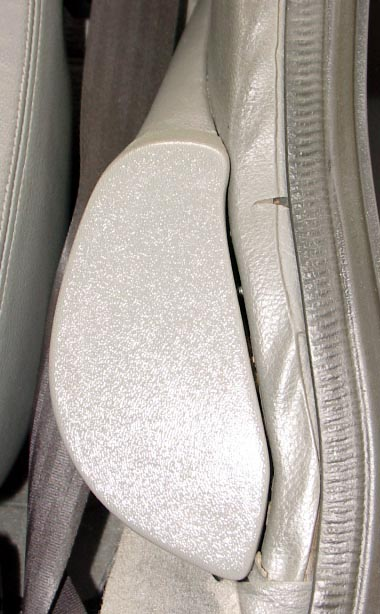
Early-style two-piece armrest extension

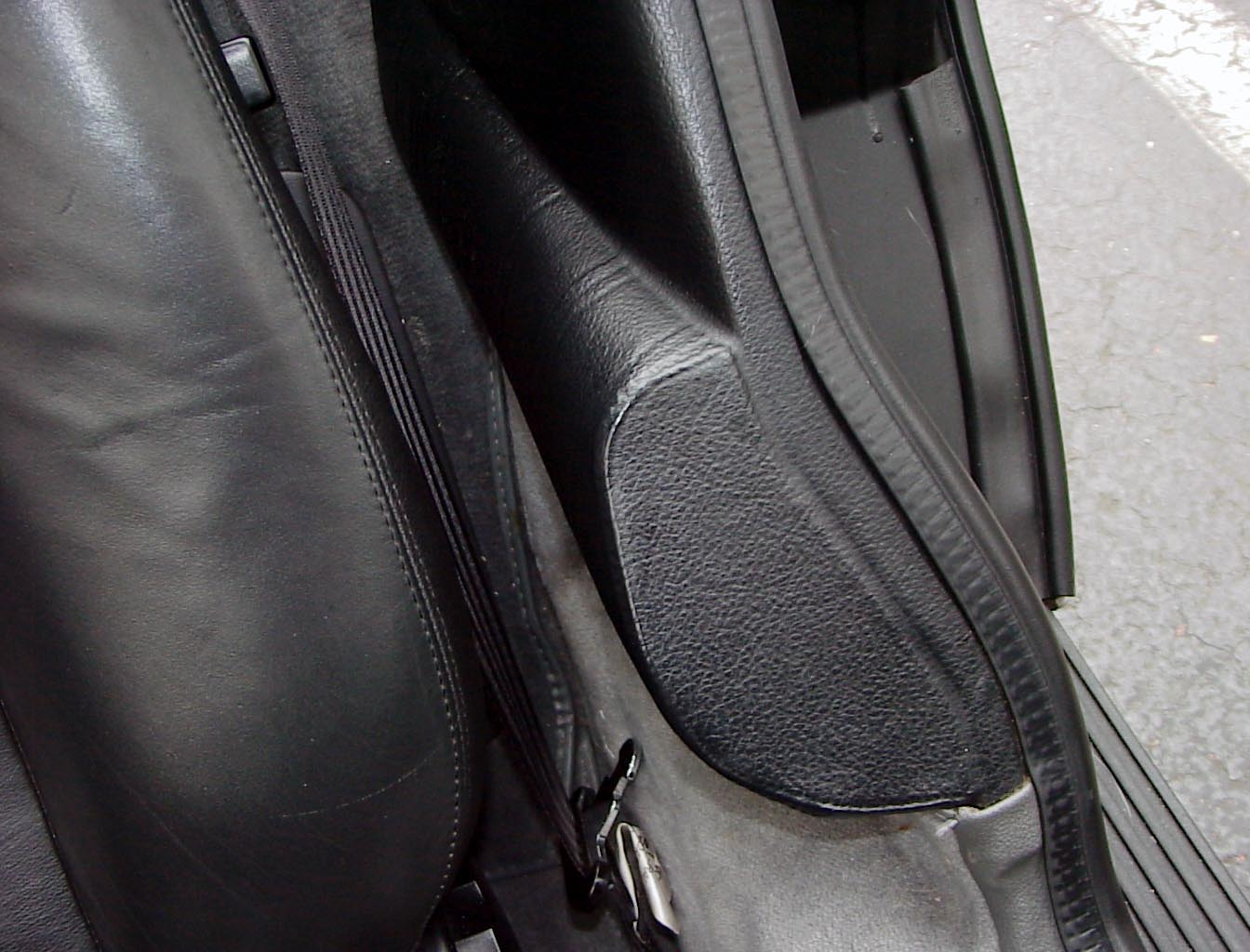
Later-style one-piece armrest extension

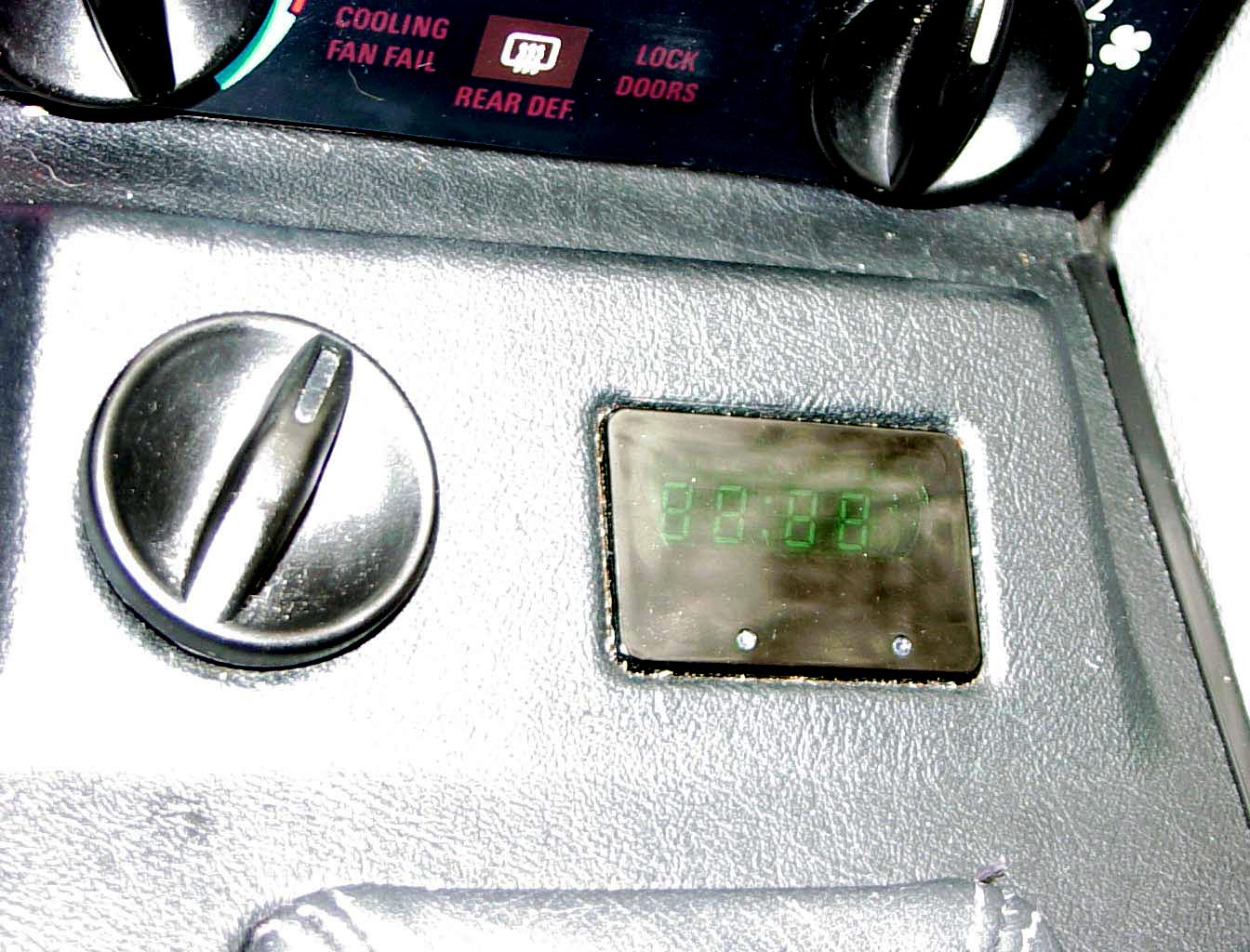
Early digital clock

== Performance ==
DMC's comparison literature stated that the DeLorean could accelerate from 0 to 60 miles per hour (97 km/h) in 8.8 seconds when equipped with a manual transmission, but Road & Track magazine measured the time at 10.5 seconds. Top speed was claimed to be 130 mph (209 km/h), but was tested to be 110 mph (177 km/h); the magazine described the car as "not quick for a sports/GT car in this price category".

== Quality problems ==
DeLoreans, early-production models in particular, suffered from poor build quality and mechanical issues. Early-production cars needed as much as 200 hours of work at DMC Quality Assurance Centers prior to being shipped to dealerships for delivery. DMC eventually sent 30 factory workers to the quality centers in the US to learn about the problems and how to fix them. Quality did improve over time, and by 1982 many of the quality issues had been resolved. Four recalls were issued by the factory to correct problems such as a sticking throttle, front-suspension issues and an inertia switch.

Other quality issues included additional problems surrounding the front suspension, clutch pedal adjustment (or lack thereof), brake rotors, instruments, in particular the speedometer, power door locks and weak alternators. Many early DeLoreans were delivered poorly aligned, with the toe-in incorrectly set, leading to premature tire wear. In addition, many dealers were reluctant to perform warranty work on DeLoreans, since DMC owed them money for past warranty claims. Some dealerships were not able to perform repair work properly, as DMC never issued a proper service manual. The lack of quality service at dealerships was a point of frustration for many DeLorean owners at the time, particularly those who paid over MSRP to purchase one of the first cars.

== Pricing and options ==
=== Base price ===
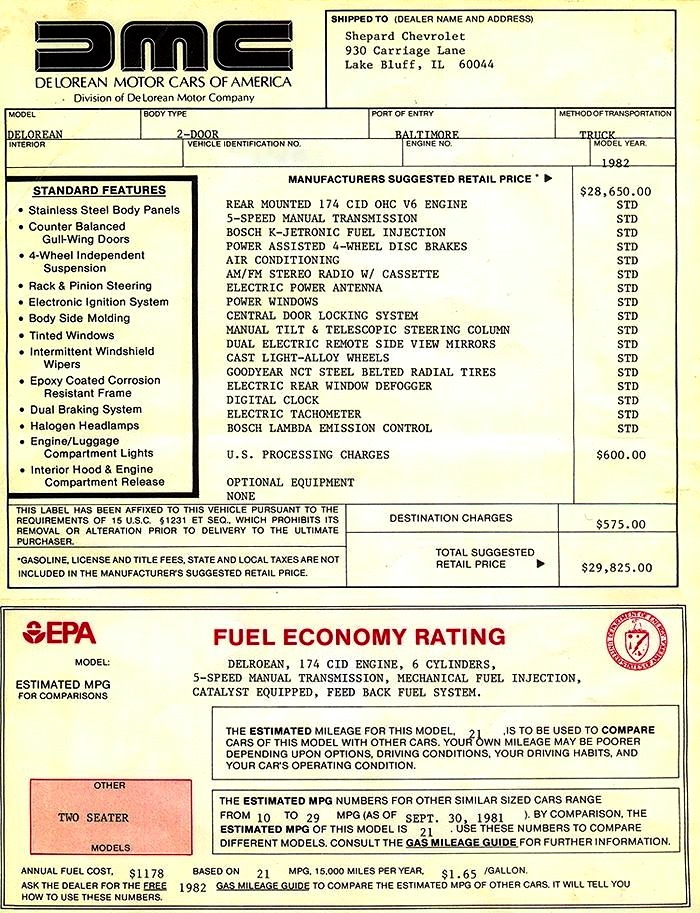
1982 Monroney sticker

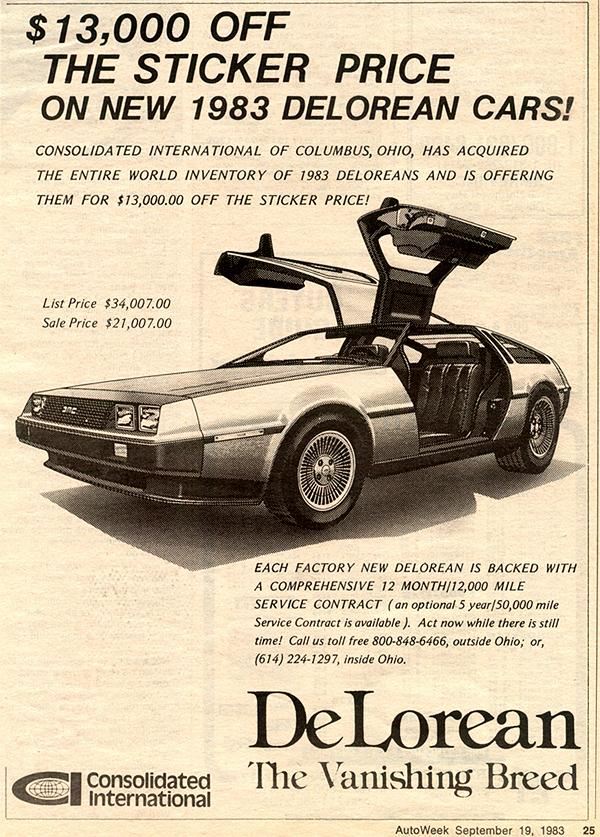
DeLorean clearance advertisement

Upon release in 1981, a DeLorean had a base MSRP of $25,000, or equivalent to $89,000 in 2025. MSRP increased in 1982 to $29,825, equivalent to $100,000 in 2025, and again in 1983 to $34,000, equivalent to $110,000 in 2025.

=== Options ===
A 3-speed automatic transmission, priced at $650 MSRP, was the only extra-cost factory option. Interior color choices were black or grey, with grey becoming available mid-1981 model year. The standard feature list included stainless-steel body panels, gull-wing doors with cryogenically-treated torsion bars, 5-speed manual transmission, Bridge of Weir leather seats, air conditioning, AM/FM cassette stereo system, power windows, locks and mirrors, a tilt and telescopic steering wheel, tinted glass, body side moldings, intermittent windshield wipers, and electric rear-window defogger.

==== Dealer options ====
Several dealer options were available, including a car cover, sheepskin seat covers, floor mats, car care cleaning kit, black-textured accent stripes, grey scotch-cal accent stripes, a luggage rack, and a ski-rack adapter.

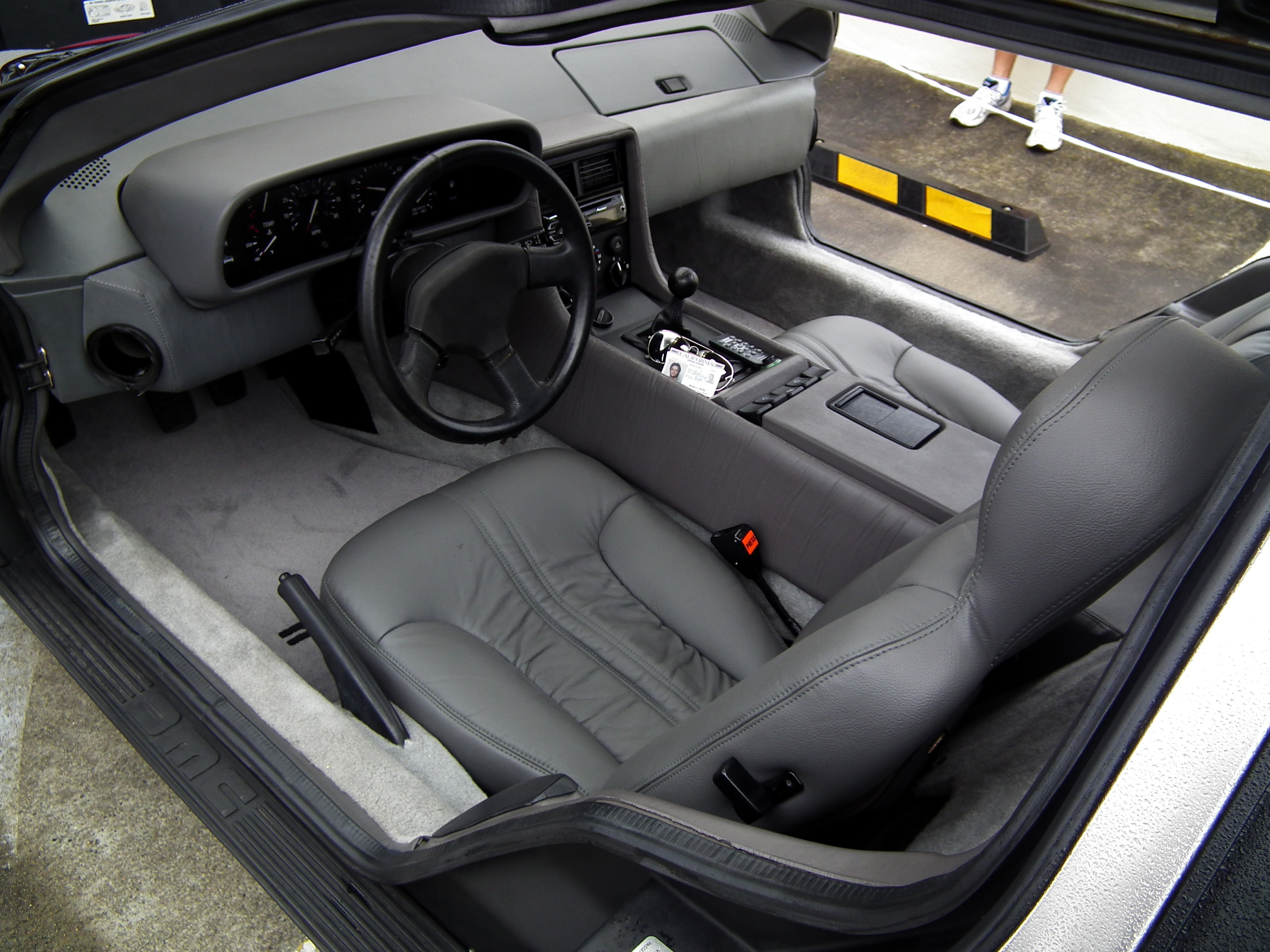
1982 DeLorean grey interior

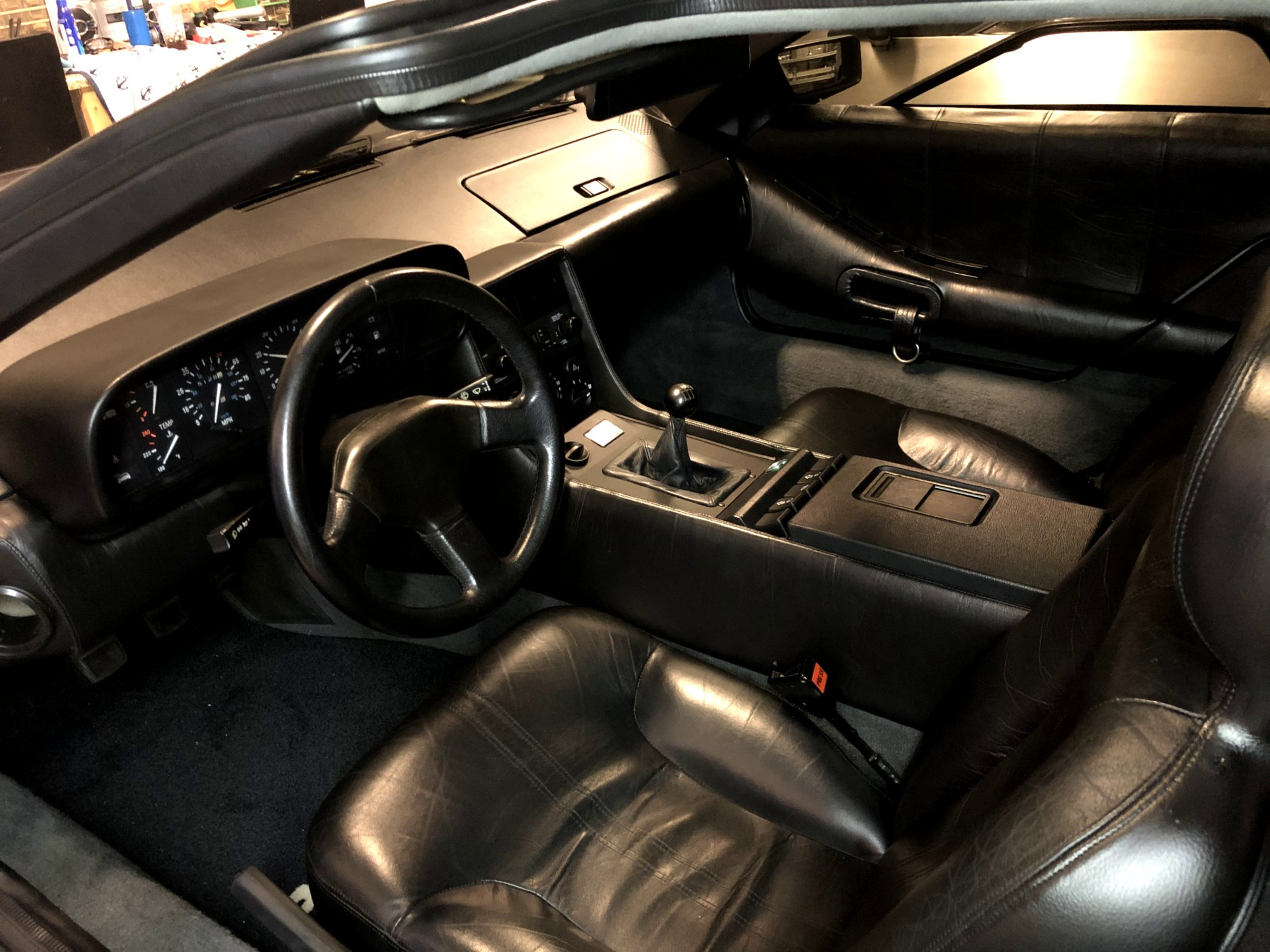
1981 DeLorean black interior

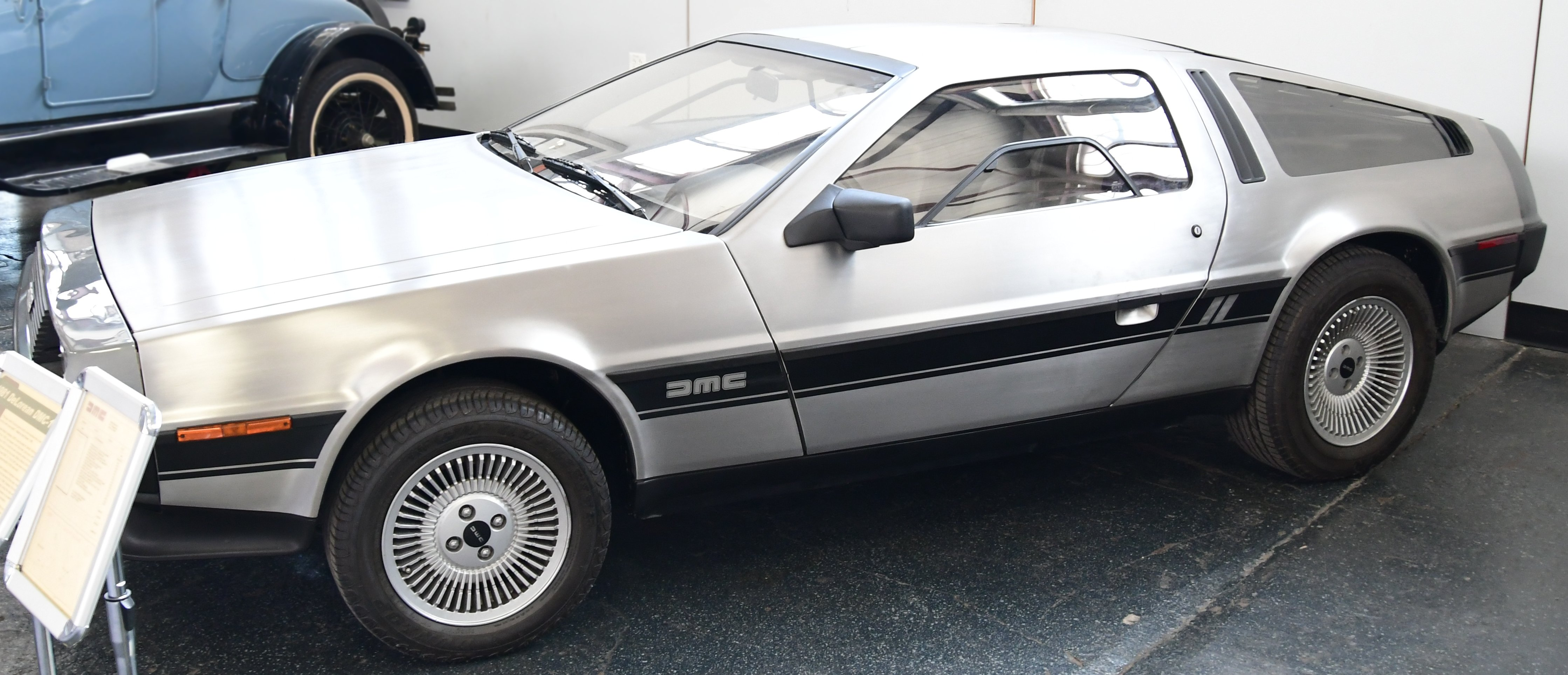
DeLorean with optional black-textured accent stripe

== Notable and unique exemplars ==
=== Wooden mock-up ===
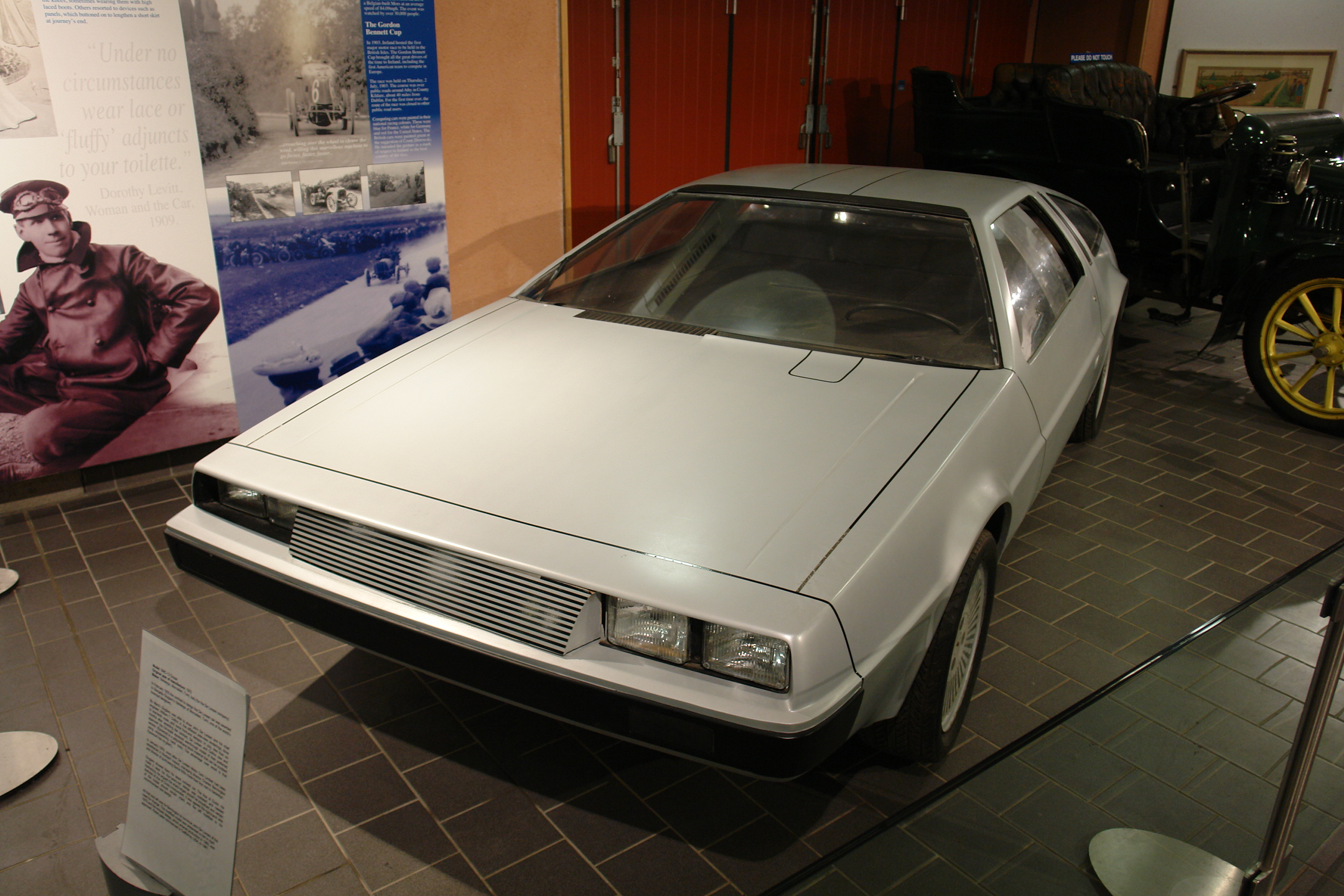
DMC-12 Coupe mock-up

In March 1975, DMC entered into a contract with Italdesign to have Giorgetto Giugiaro design the DeLorean sports car. John DeLorean and Bill Collins approved one of the many designs, and the styling mock-up that was made from "epo-wood" (wooden framework with a special epoxy plaster) was shipped to the DMC office in Michigan on July 31, 1975. This mock-up served as the template for the prototype. The original full-size epo-wood DeLorean styling model was modified in the first quarter 1979 to reflect the refreshed design used in production. The mock-up was donated to the Ulster Folk and Transport Museum, in Cultra, Northern Ireland, where it is on display.

=== Prototypes and pilot cars ===
Only one of two DeLorean prototypes still exists. Prototype-1 was sold at the bankruptcy auction in 1984 for $37,000. The car remained in a private collection until 2005 when it was sold and received a complete restoration. The car is in a private collection.

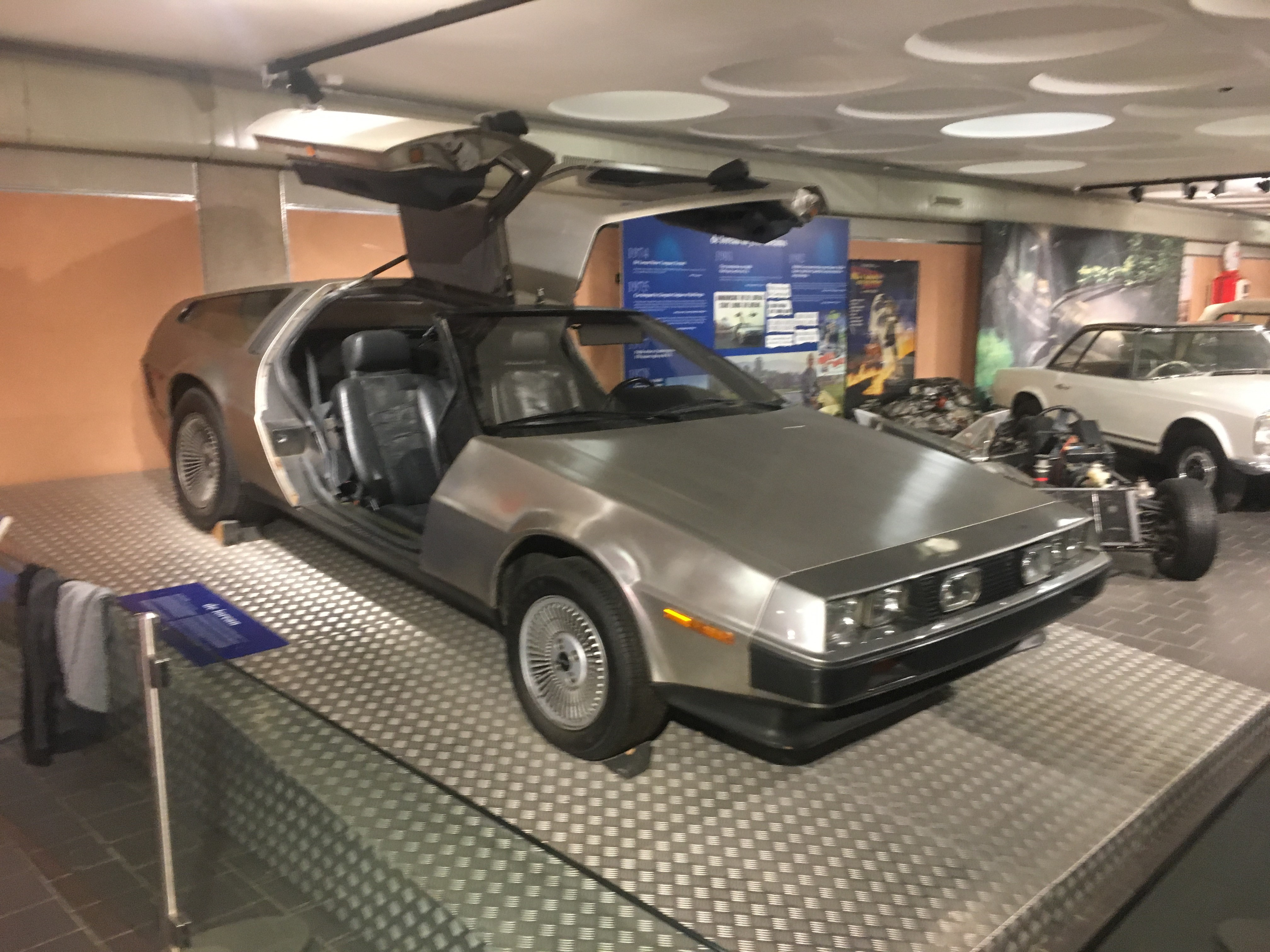
A car used by DMC and the Ulster Motor Club to certify the car's emissions and reliability on display at the Ulster Folk and Transport Museum. Note the extra headlamps and lack of DMC badge on the front grille.

Prototype-2 was sent to Lotus Cars for development and evaluation in 1978. It was reported to have been destroyed in the 1990s.

An estimated 28 pilot cars were built. The pilot cars are best identified by the subtly different interiors and sliding side windows. These cars were used for evaluation and regulatory testing of the DeLorean. A few of the pilot cars have survived and are owned by private parties.

=== Visioneering car ===
With the 1980 NADA meeting approaching, DMC planned to show a final production version of the DeLorean; however, there were no production cars ready at the time or even any production stainless steel panels. Earlier, in summer 1979, the revised Giugiaro styling mock-up was shipped to Visioneering, a Detroit-based company, to create data needed to make the stamping dies for the stainless panels. This project expanded to also manufacture the dies used to create a "production" car for the NADA show. Using a prototype chassis supplied by Lotus in late 1979, Visioneering completed the assembly of this car at a cost of $750,000. The car was presented at the 1980 NADA show and was later used for engineering development and technical training as well as press photos. The Visioneering car eventually was sold at the bankruptcy auction in late 1984 for $21,000. The car is in a private collection.

=== Legend turbo cars ===
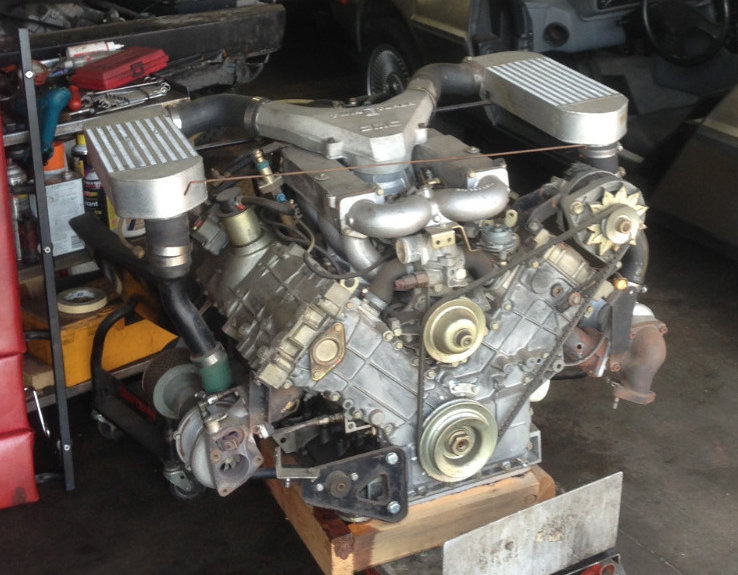
Legend twin-turbo setup from VIN 530

It was determined that the DeLorean needed additional power when automotive magazine road tests showed 0–60 mph (0–97 km/h) times for the DeLorean between 9.5 and 10.5 seconds, while its rivals were in the 7.5–8.5 seconds range. There had been interest in turbocharging the DeLorean early on, but the DMC engineering staff was busy with other projects, so DMC decided to go outside to develop a turbocharged version.

DMC entered into a contract with Legend Industries, based in Hauppauge, New York, a firm having previous success with turbocharging Fiat Spiders for Fiat USA. DMC wanted to increase power without sacrificing fuel efficiency. DMC wanted a wide power band and did not want a surge of power similar to the Porsche 911 Turbo. Legend used twin IHI RHB52 turbos along with twin intercoolers. The results were an engine capable of accelerating smoothly in fifth gear from 1,500 rpm to full turbo boost at 2,500 rpm, reaching 150 mph (240 km/h) at 6,500 rpm.

Legend converted four DeLoreans: two twin-turbo cars (VIN 502 and VIN 530) and two single-turbo cars (VIN 528 and VIN 558). In a test run at Bridgehampton Raceway in 1981, the twin-turbo DeLorean was quicker than a Ferrari 308 and a Porsche 928. The twin-turbo DeLorean tested 0–60 mph in 5.8 seconds and the 1/4 mile (402 m) in 14.7 seconds. John Dinkel of Road & Track called the twin-turbo DeLorean "fantastic" comparing the acceleration to a Porsche 930 Turbo. John DeLorean was so impressed with the engine, he committed to ordering 5,000 engines from Legend Industries. DMC planned to offer a turbocharged engine as a $7,500 option in 1984. Before any of the 5,000 cars could be put into production, DMC had declared bankruptcy, which drove Legend Industries, as well as other suppliers, into bankruptcy.

=== Right-hand-drive models ===
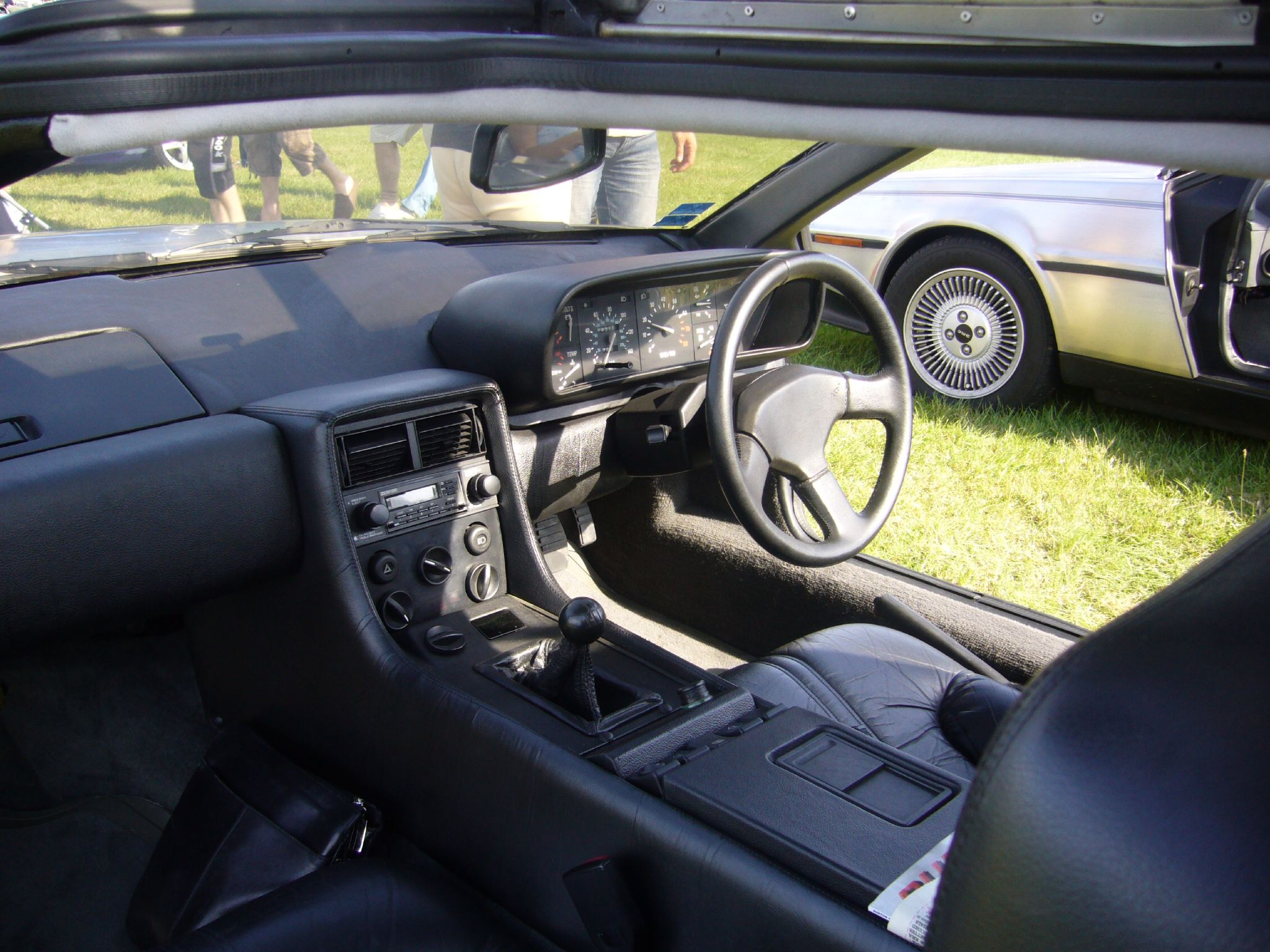
Right-hand-drive DeLorean

DeLoreans were primarily intended for the American market and all production models were therefore left-hand-drive. DMC was aware as early as April 1981 of the need to produce a right-hand-drive (RHD) version to supply to world markets, specifically the United Kingdom. DMC faced the choice of building right-hand-drive models from scratch or performing a post-production conversion. Given the cost of new body molds, tooling, and a host of specific parts that a factory-built right-hand-drive configuration would require, the company opted to investigate the idea of a post-production conversion using Wooler-Hodec, an English company based in Andover, Hampshire. About 30 early DeLoreans were shipped to Wooler-Hodec and the best 20 were to be converted to RHD however, only 13 conversions were completed. Wooler-Hodec would close shortly thereafter.

Three other factory-authorized RHD cars were built. Known as AXI cars, these cars were registered and used by the factory in Northern Ireland, with registration numbers (license plates), AXI 1697, AXI 1698, AXI 1699 and have minor differences from the Wooler-Hodec cars.

After the liquidation of DMC, many of the factory company cars were sold at various auctions around the United Kingdom, some of which were converted by former Wooler-Hodec employees and DMC engineers to RHD resulting in eight known post-factory RHD conversions.

=== Gold-plated ===
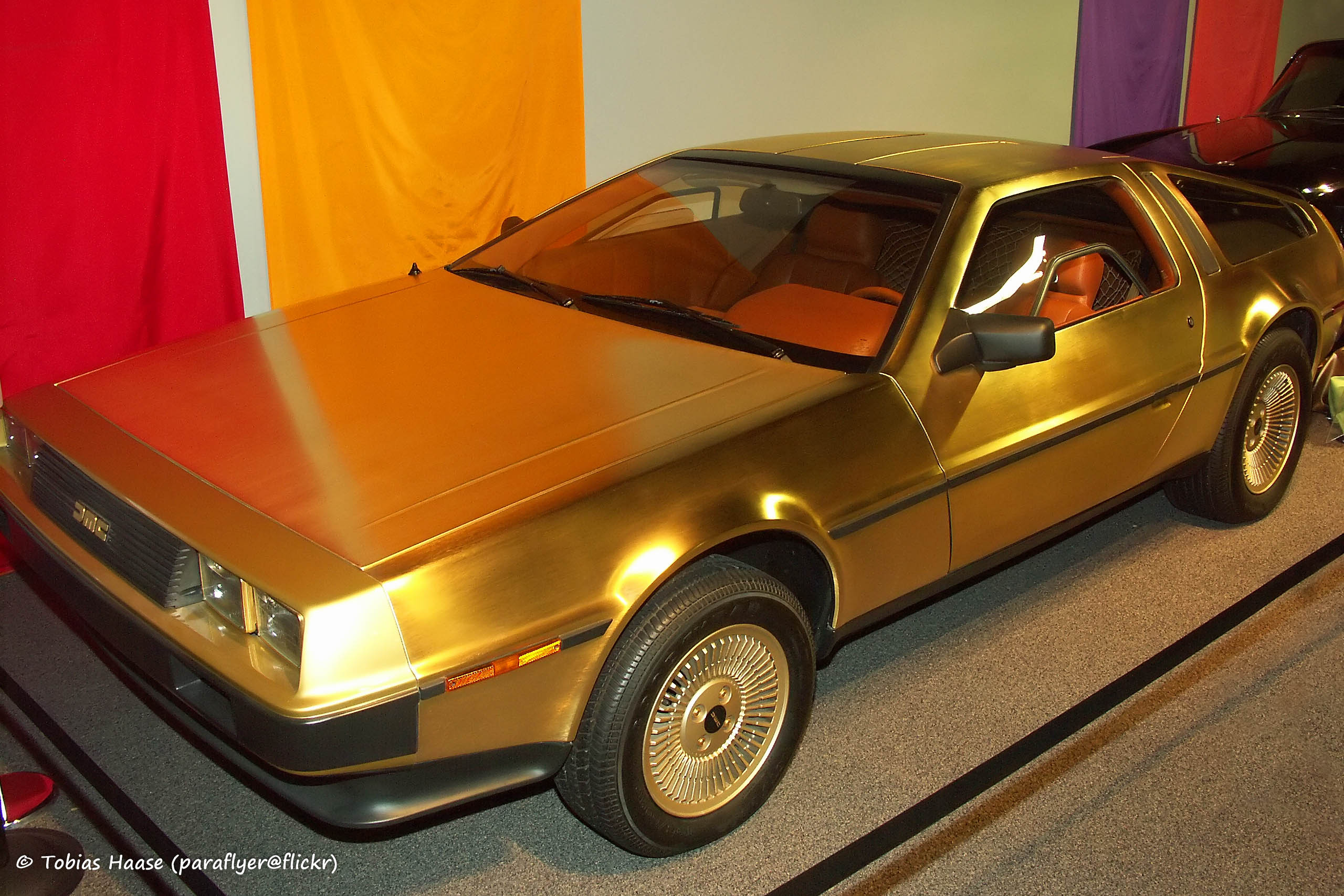
A gold-plated DeLorean in Reno, Nevada

For Christmas 1980, a DeLorean/American Express promotion planned to sell 100 24K-gold-plated DeLoreans for $85,000 each to its gold-card members, but only two were sold. The first gold-plated American Express DeLorean was purchased by Sherwood Marshall, an entrepreneur and former Royal Canadian Naval Officer. This car, VIN 4300, is equipped with a manual transmission and a saddle-brown interior. Marshall donated his DeLorean to the William F. Harrah Foundation/National Automobile Museum in Reno, Nevada.

The second gold-plated DeLorean was purchased by Roger Mize, president of Snyder National Bank in Snyder, Texas. This car, VIN 4301, equipped with an automatic transmission and black interior, sat in the bank lobby for over 20 years before being loaned to the Petersen Automotive Museum in Los Angeles.

A third gold-plated car was assembled with spare parts that were required by American Express in case one of the other two that were built was damaged. All necessary gold-plated parts were on hand, with the exception of one door that was sourced later. The car was first acquired by the winner of a Big Lots store raffle. This car, VIN 20105, is in a private collection.

Two other privately commissioned gold-plated DeLoreans exist (VIN 1542 and VIN 16625) and are in private collections.

=== Back to the Future ===
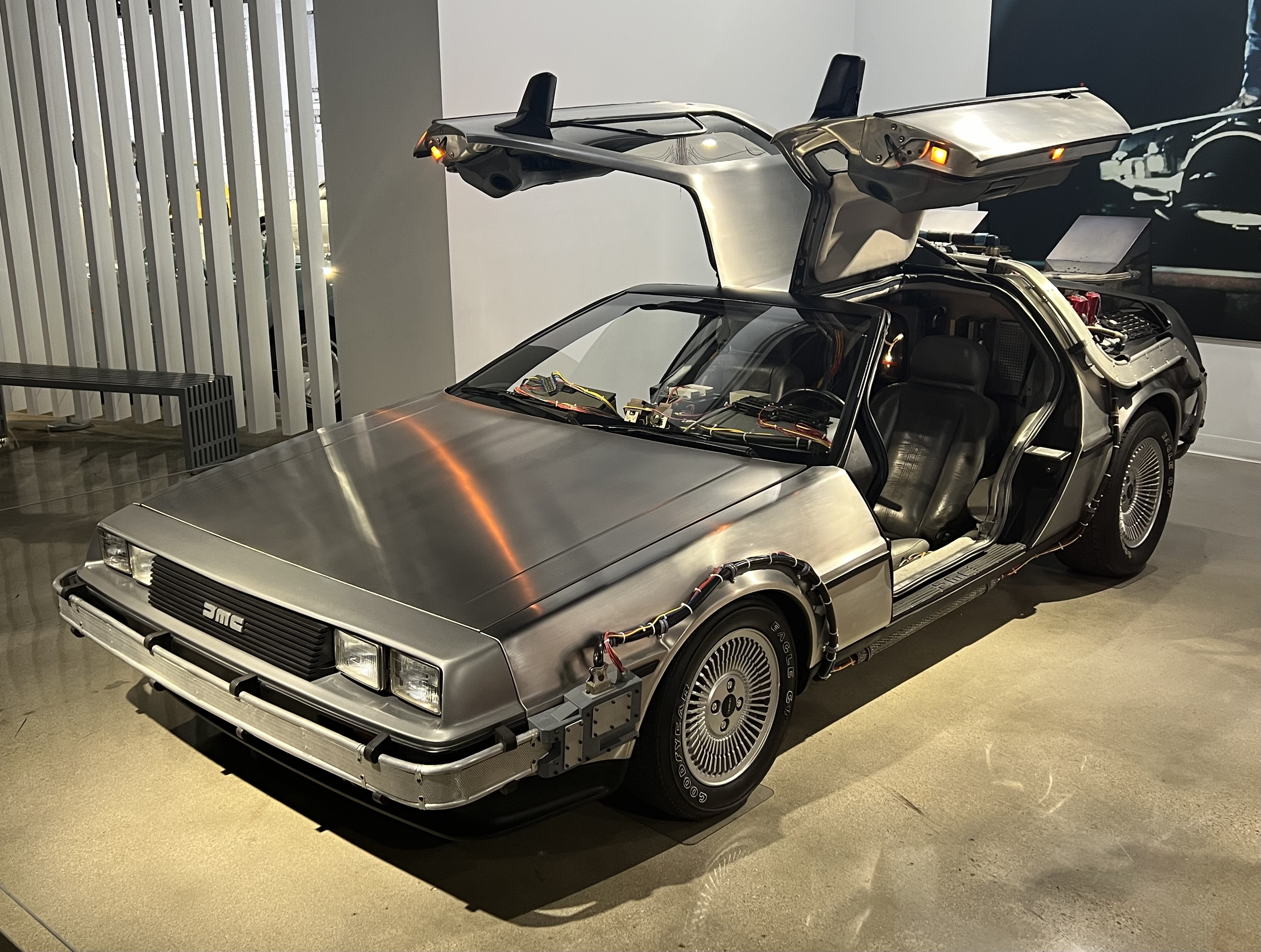
The fully-restored "Hero" car from the Back to the Future trilogy on exhibit at the Petersen Automotive Museum.

The DMC DeLorean is most notably featured as the time machine in the Back to the Future film trilogy. Six DeLoreans were used during the production, along with one manufactured out of fiberglass for scenes where a full-size DeLorean was needed to "fly" on-screen. The cars used in the first film had the original V6 engine (whose sound in the movie comes from the V8 engine of a Porsche 928). Two of the cars used in Back to the Future Part III were equipped with Volkswagen engines and dune buggy chassis for filming the scenes in the Western terrain.

Only three of the cars still exist, with one that was destroyed at the end of Part III, two additional cars were abandoned, and the fiberglass replica used in Part II was scrapped. Universal Studios owns two of the remaining cars, occasionally putting them on display or using them for other productions. The third car, used in Back to the Future Part III, was restored and was sold at auction for $541,200 in December 2011. A fully restored Back to the Future DeLorean can be viewed at the Petersen Automotive Museum in Los Angeles.

== Reception ==
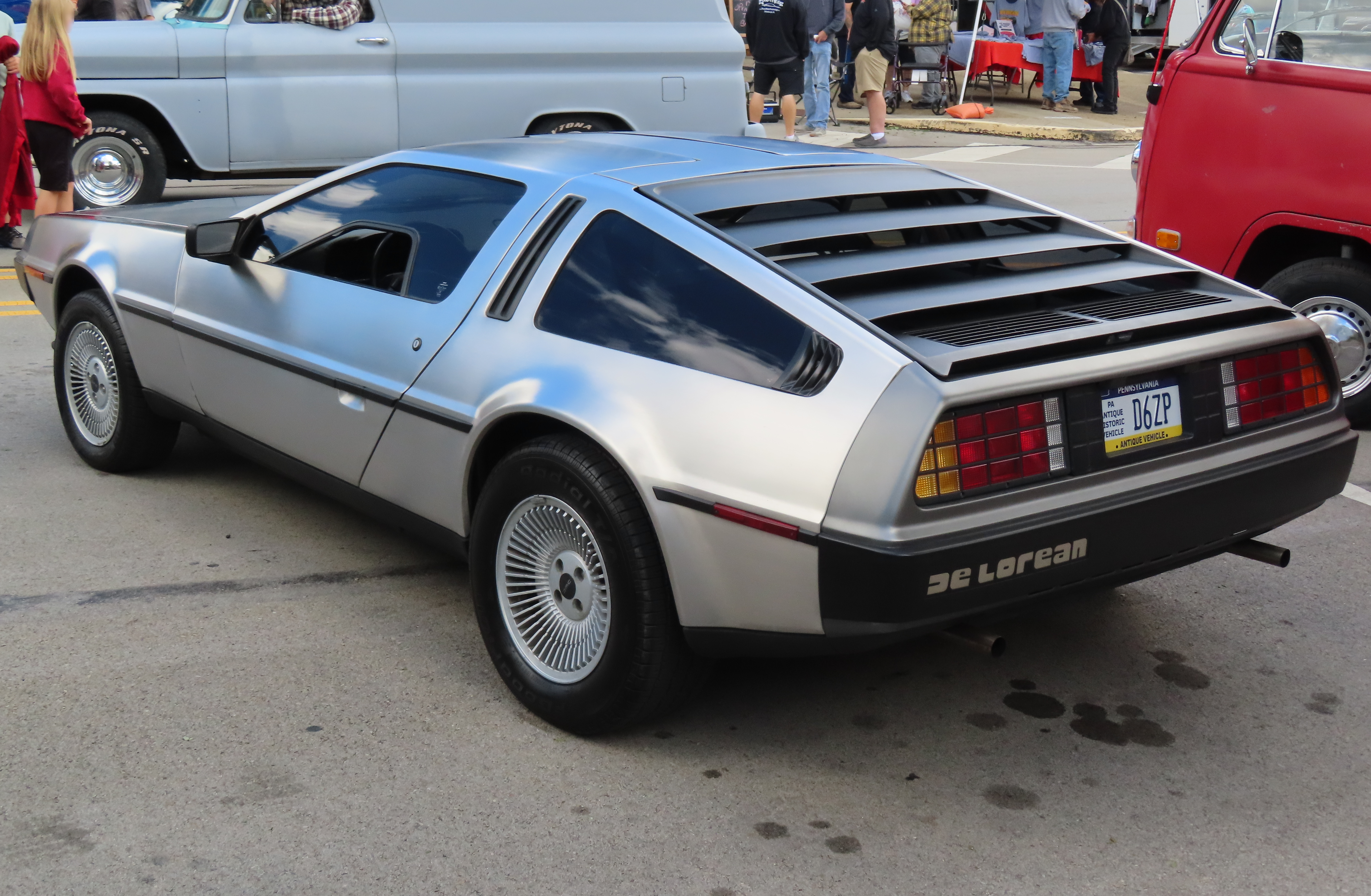
1983 DeLorean

At the time of release, the automotive press was complimentary. Motor Trend, Car and Driver, and Road & Track made generally positive remarks about the car, particularly its daily-driver qualities, like the comfortable seats on longer drives, unexpected ease of ingress and egress in tight parking, and for such a low car, spacious trunk, pleasant smell of the standard leather seats in the cabin, and commendable fuel economy. However, they argued that the DeLorean is more a grand touring (GT) car, offering enjoyable handling and performance in real life traffic, and "on your favorite two-lane roads", than a sports car, given its disappointing performance in comparative testing.

Later reviews have been harsher. In 2017, Time included the DeLorean in its list of the 50 worst cars of all time. In his book Naff Motors: 101 Automotive Lemons, Tony Davis described the build quality as "woeful". Top Gear writer Richard Porter included it in his book Crap Cars, calling it "dismal".

== Legacy ==
The DeLorean continues to have a following more than 40 years after the company shut down. The car's distinct looks and popularity from the Back to the Future film franchise make the vehicle widely recognizable. The DeLorean community is international and there are DeLorean clubs across North America and Europe as well as clubs in Australia, Japan, and New Zealand. Most automotive museums around the world have a DeLorean in their collection, and the car is often cited as one of the museums' star attractions.

== In media ==
A modified DeLorean was notably featured as the time machine in Back to the Future. Director Robert Zemeckis suggested the DeLorean because it offered mobility and a unique design; the gull-wing doors would appear like an alien UFO to a 1950s family. The DeLorean has appeared in television and movies, often as a symbol of the 1980s, in films such as The Wedding Singer and television episodes of American Dad! and The Simpsons. DeLoreans have been featured on numerous car restoration and build shows including Wheeler Dealers and Supercar Megabuild.

While in production, the DeLorean was featured in several cross-promotional print media advertisements. Some suppliers such as Sylvania and Goodyear were convinced of the merits of letting customers know their products were used on the DeLorean while others such as American Express and Cutty Sark were interested in their brand being associated with the DeLorean.

The 1987 song, "Rock Soldiers" by Ace Frehley refers to an autobiographical event describing an attempt to escape from the police while driving a red 1981 DeLorean reaching speeds of approximately 90 mph (145 km/h) with a suspended license.

Both the DeLorean and the BTTF-themed DeLorean have appeared in numerous video games and is included as a playable vehicle in franchises such as Forza, Gran Turismo, and The Crew.

== Bibliography ==
- Clarke, R. M. (1995). DeLorean: 1977–1995 Gold Portfolio. Cobham: Brooklands. ISBN 1-85520-331-6.
- Espey, James (2014). The Illustrated Buyer's Guide to DeLorean Automobiles (2nd ed.). The DeLorean Garage. ISBN 978-0-9856578-1-9.
- Lamm, John (2003). DeLorean Stainless Steel Illusion (2nd ed.). Fort Jones, CA: Red Lion Press. ISBN 0-9744141-0-7.
- Parnham, Chris; Withers, Andrew (2014). DeLorean Celebrating the Impossible. DeLorean Motor Cars (1978) Ltd. ISBN 978-0-9928594-0-4.
- Wills, Barrie (2015). John Z, the DeLorean & Me: Tales from an Insider. Houston, TX: DeLorean Garage. ISBN 978-0-9856578-8-8. "an insider's view of the longest serving employee, director of purchasing and last CEO of DeLorean Motor Cars in Northern Ireland"
