= Muhammad Afzal =

Muhammad Afzal may refer to:

- Muhammad Afzal (wrestler) (1939–2020), Pakistani Olympic wrestler
- Muhammad Afzal (politician) (born 1964), Pakistani politician in the Punjab
- Muhammad Afzal (athlete) (born 1967), Pakistani Olympic sprinter
- Mawlawi Afzal, Afghan mujahideen

== See also ==
- Mohammad Afzal (disambiguation)
