= Factory service manual =

Manual provided by manufacturers

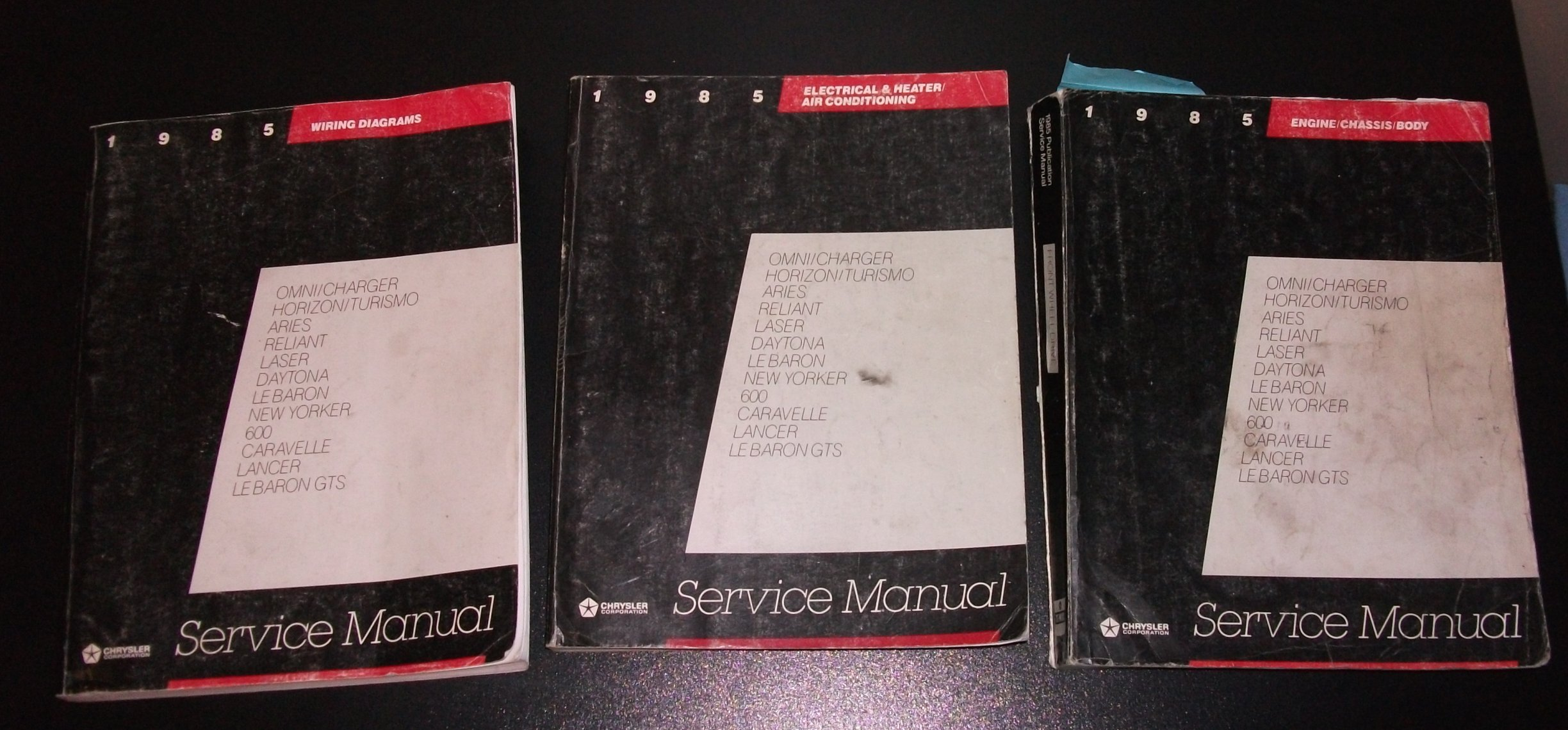
Chrysler manuals

Factory service manuals (FSM) are the manuals provided by manufacturers which cover the servicing, maintenance, and repair of their products. They are not designed for the general public, however they are created by manufacturers for use at their OEM dealerships. Manufacturers have a team of technical engineers, writers and illustrators who compile information for these service manuals.

Some companies create aftermarket repair manuals for the general public to purchase such as Clymer and Haynes. These manuals are also generally available as online auto repair manuals.

Factory service manuals have seen the implementation of digitalization over the years. Factory service manuals are generally the only source of information for manufacturers labor time guides. These are times that are generated through labor time studies that are used in warranty operations.

For vehicles, the following content are usually covered: body, frame & mounting, engine, suspension, driveline, brake systems, transmission/transaxle, clutch, chains, exhaust, fuel, steering, shocks, climate control, instrumentation & Warnings Systems, battery & charging systems, audio, lighting, electrical distribution, Anti-lock braking system (ABS) and wiring, as well as listing nut and bolt torque specs.
