= Afzal, Iran =

Afzal افضل
- Village
- Location within Iran
- Coordinates: 37°42′09″N 47°48′12″E
- Country: Iran
- Province: East Azerbaijan
- County: Meyaneh
- Bakhsh: Kandovan
- Rural District: Kandovan

Population (2006)
  - Total: 93
- Time zone: UTC+3:30 (IRST)
  - Summer (DST): UTC+4:30 (IRDT)

Afzal (Persian: افضل, also Romanized as Afẕal) is a village in Kandovan Rural District, Kandovan District, Meyaneh County, East Azerbaijan Province, Iran. In the 2006 census, its population was 93, in 20 families.
