= Mohammad Afzal (Multan cricketer) =

Pakistani cricketer

Personal information
- Born: 1 January 1955 (age 71); Sahiwal, Punjab, Pakistan
- Batting: Right-handed
- Bowling: Left-arm orthodox

Domestic team information
- Years: Team
- 1988–1993: Multan
- Source: CricketArchive, 11 March 2016

Mohammad Afzal (born 1 January 1955) is a former Pakistani cricketer who represented Multan in Pakistani domestic cricket. He played as a left-arm orthodox bowler who batted right-handed.

Afzal was born in Sahiwal, Punjab. He made his first-class debut for Multan in January 1988, in a BCCP Patron's Trophy match against the Karachi Blues, and also made five Quaid-i-Azam Trophy appearances later in the year. Afzal made his List A debut in November 1988, in the limited-overs Wills Cup. After the 1988–89 season, Afzal did not return to Multan's team until January 1993, aged 38. He made two Quaid-i-Azam Trophy and six Wills Cup appearances, with the 1992–93 season being his last at that level. In the second innings of a Quaid-i-Azam match against Faisalabad, he took 4/81, the best figures of his first-class career.
