= Supercar Megabuild =

UK-based television series

- Genre: Documentary; Motoring; Reality television
- Starring: Afzal Kahn; Ralph Hosier; Ranen Rudra; Steve Whitaker; Alex Prindiville; Shane Lynch; Dan Barruffo
- Narrated by: Dom Joly
- Country of origin: United Kingdom
- No. of seasons: 2
- No. of episodes: 18

Production
- Executive producer: Rick Murray
- Producer: Ben Smith
- Production locations: Bradford, United Kingdom (Kahn HQ) & (Ralph and Ranen's workshop); Leeds, United Kingdom (Kahn Showroom); Japan (Rolls-Royce Silver Shadow & Nissan GT-R episode); United States (Chevrolet Camaro episode); Mexico (Jeep Wrangler & Mercedes G-Wagen episode); Sahara Desert (Range Rover Evoque episode); Hemel Hempstead Snow Centre (Audi A8 episode); French Alps (Audi A8 episode)
- Running time: 60 minutes
- Production company: Shine North TV

Original release
- Network: National Geographic Channel
- Release: February 17, 2016 – present

Supercar Megabuild is a UK-based entertainment program aired on the National Geographic Channel. It follows the work of independent car designers Afzal Kahn (Season 1) and Alex Prindiville (Season 2) (former owner of Prindiville PLC) as they task two mechanics to design and build cars to meet their clients' specifications. In the first season Ralph Hosier and Ranen Rudra are the engineers; while in Season 2, Shane Lynch and Dan Baruffo perform those roles.

== Plot ==
=== Season 1 ===
Afzal Kahn hires two professional engineers to create challenging one-off and prototype cars in very short timescales. Ralph and Ranen are both free-thinking engineers, which results in unique solutions that Mr. Kahn does not always like to start with. Ralph and Ranen sometimes have to travel to other countries to learn something new.

=== Season 2 ===
Season 2 has Alex Prindiville, owner of Prindiville PLC, replacing Afzal Kahn. Prindiville employs professional racing driver & mechanic Shane Lynch and master builder Dan Baruffo to modify cars to meet his specifications.

== Episodes ==
=== Season 1 ===
Episode number	Car type	First aired	Description
01	Aston Martin Vantage	17 February 2016	Ralph and Ranen are tasked to make a GT-inspired Aston Martin Vantage.
02	Rolls-Royce Silver Shadow	24 February 2016	Ralph and Ranen are tasked to make a luxury Rolls-Royce Silver Shadow into a drift car for Japspeed drifter Shane Lynch.
03	Range Rover Evoque	2 March 2016	Ralph and Ranen are tasked to make a Dakar Rally version of the Range Rover Evoque.
04	Mercedes G-Wagen	9 March 2016	Ralph and Ranen are tasked to build a safe and bulletproof car for a VIP client of Mr. Kahn, they visit Tijuana, Mexico to meet Victor Toys and ask him to help them with a Mercedes-Benz G-Wagen in Kahn’s workshop, in UK.
05	Jeep Wrangler	16 March 2016	In an attempt to break to the US market, Mr. Kahn tasked Ralph and Ranen a challenge, they look for the Customizer Expert Victor Toys in Tijuana, Mexico to convert a Jeep Wrangler into a pickup truck.
06	Nissan GT-R	23 March 2016	Ralph and Ranen are given a challenge by Mr. Kahn to build a car that is faster than a Bugatti Veyron and with only a 1/10 the cost. They went to Japan to buy an R35 Nissan GT-R, to Mr. Kahn's disappointment both in the car (due to it being a Japanese car, in which he explicitly says that he only focuses on European cars), and the project itself, after the duo experiences tough challenges along the way.
07	Porsche Panamera S Hybrid	30 March 2016	In order to impress the Chinese Delegates, and a reluctant Mr. Kahn, Ralph and Ranen are tasked to make an eco-friendly luxury sports saloon out of a Porsche Panamera S Hybrid.
08	Bentley Mulsanne	6 April 2016	A great friend of Mr. Kahn wants to go hunting in his Bentley Mulsanne, so Ralph and Ranen are tasked to modify it to have hunting capability without sacrificing comfort and luxury.
09	Chevrolet Camaro	13 April 2016	Ralph and Ranen are given a task to convert an American Muscle car into a European one. They are sent to the United States to choose a perfect Muscle car for the job, in which they picked the 2015 Chevrolet Camaro SS.
10	Audi A8	20 April 2016	Ralph and Ranen are given a task to build an executive all-terrain Audi A8. They install caterpillar tracks onto it and test in an indoor snow centre, much to the client's delight.

=== Season 2 ===
Episode number	Car type	First aired	Description
01	Le Mans Maserati	25/5/17	Jodie Kidd challenges Prindiville to create a 200 mph Maserati Ghibli in homage to the Maserati Tipo 61 Le Mans racer. The project is passed onto Dan and Shane.
02	DeLorean Reboot	1/6/17	Prindiville is asked to redesign the DeLorean for the 21st century. Dan and Shane are tasked with redesigning the car to make it futuristic, but still keep the essence of the original DeLorean.
03	Sub-Zero Porsche	8/6/17	Prindiville has asked a journalist to do a publicity shoot. He orders Shane and Dan to modify a VW-Porsche 914-6 for an ice rally in only four weeks in Sweden. Dan and Shane pull out all the stops to pull it off.
04	Monster Bentley GT	15/6/17	A client, Mark Chapman, wants a Bentley Continental GT that can tackled extreme terrain in luxury. Dan and Shane has to create a Mad Max-style vehicle from the ultra-luxury Grand Tourer car in just four weeks.
05	Audi R8 Drifter	22/6/17	Shane and Dan pitches the idea of creating a drift car for the Gymkhana Grid. Alex Prindiville gives them an Audi R8 and they completely reengineer the AWD supercar into a RWD drifter in three weeks. They hope for an internet hit, but Prindiville is quite unimpressed with the final design.
06	Jaguar Dragster	29/6/17	Prindiville takes up the job of creating an homage to the iconic Supermarine Spitfire that can also beat a modern Chevrolet Corvette C7 in a drag race, with the client specifically asking him to make one from a vintage European Jaguar because it will complement the British-made airplane very well. Dan and Shane came to Victor Toys in Tijuana, Mexico and, after having a hard time looking for a suitable Jaguar for the job, ended up with a beat-up banger, a 1976 XJ-S convertible. They have just three weeks before the Jag is showcased beside the Commemorative Air Force's Spitfire. Dan supervises the build, while Shane heads to Tucson Dragway in Arizona to hone his reaction time off the line at the dragstrip.
07	McLaren P1 Superbike	6/7/17	A £2 million deal is a prospect for Prindiville, if he can create a superbike that matches the style of the McLaren P1 hypercar and beats it in a timed lap. Dan and Shane take a stock Ducati 1299 Panigale S and shed weight from the already light bike, as well as tuning it for better power-to-weight ratio. They then race it against the P1 in Rockingham Motor Speedway to see if it has what it takes to smash the multi-million Euro hypercar's lap time.
08	Lamborghini Transporter	13/7/17	A US client who wants to conserve the welfare of his Lamborghini Huracan commissions Prindiville to create a car transporter/tow truck to transport his Lamborghini anywhere, including off-road. Dan and Shane go to the enthusiastic Victor Toys in the hopes of turning a battered old Ford F-250 Custom rollback tow truck into the blinded-up go-anywhere supercar transporter. They were going to use a Hummer H2 as a body when a maniacal Mr. Prindiville shows up unexpectedly and tells them to clean up the mess.
