= Afzal Kahn (automotive designer) =

British automotive designer and entrepreneur

Afzal Kahn is a British automotive designer and entrepreneur. He is the founder of the Kahn group of companies: Kahn Design, the Chelsea Truck Company, Project Kahn, Flying Huntsman, Designio and Racing Green.

== Work ==
Kahn, who has been described as "The King of Car Customisation" by the automotive magazine, Autocar, pulled out of architecture to pursue his love for cars.

In 1996, Kahn designed the RS-R alloy wheel. The design, in which the spokes gave the appearance of continuing all the way to the rim was considered a first in the industry. Using capital derived from the initial sold-out production run of 1,000 RS-R wheels, Kahn founded A. Kahn Design in Bradford, West Yorkshire in the late 1990s. Kahn continued in the role of creative director, releasing further wheel designs, and adding exterior styling and vehicle interior design to the company's product range. He also sought partnerships with other fashion brands to collaborate on the interior designs, such as Harris Tweed.

By 2002, Kahn Design had diversified into production of complete vehicle upgrades, necessitating a move to new, purpose-built premises in 2004, which incorporated body shop and leatherworking facilities. Kahn bought some Land Rovers and once the cars were in his studio he re-styled and re-engineered them.

In 2008, Kahn purchased the "F1" registration plate for £440,000 which set a UK record for the most expensive plate sold at auction.

== Television and Film ==
Kahn appeared in the first season (10 episodes) of the television series Supercar Megabuild, featured on the National Geographic Channel. Kahn has also been featured on the BBC's The One Show. He was interviewed by the entrepreneur, Theo Paphitis. An enthusiastic film fan, Kahn has provided vehicles for a number of films including Edge of Tomorrow starring Tom Cruise and the 2017 thriller Extremis, while also working alongside Imax and Universal to promote the release of record-breaking blockbuster Fast and Furious 8.

== Honours ==
In December 2014, Kahn was presented with a lifetime achievement award at the Car Dealer Magazine awards. The judging panel paid tribute to his achievements, acknowledging that for more than 20 years, he has been setting the trends in automotive fashion.

In June 2015, Kahn was honoured with a design and innovation award at the Birmingham Made Me Awards. The judging panel recognised the significant investment made in both design and manufacturing as part of the WB12 Vengeance project.

- Young Entrepreneur of the Year – Business Link (1999)
- Global Trader of the Year – ABDN (2004)
- Businessman of the Year – HSBC Business Awards (2007)
- Lifetime Achievement Award – Car Magazine (2014)
- Award for Design & Innovation – BMM Innovation and Design Awards (2015)
