= Zenos Cars =

British car maker

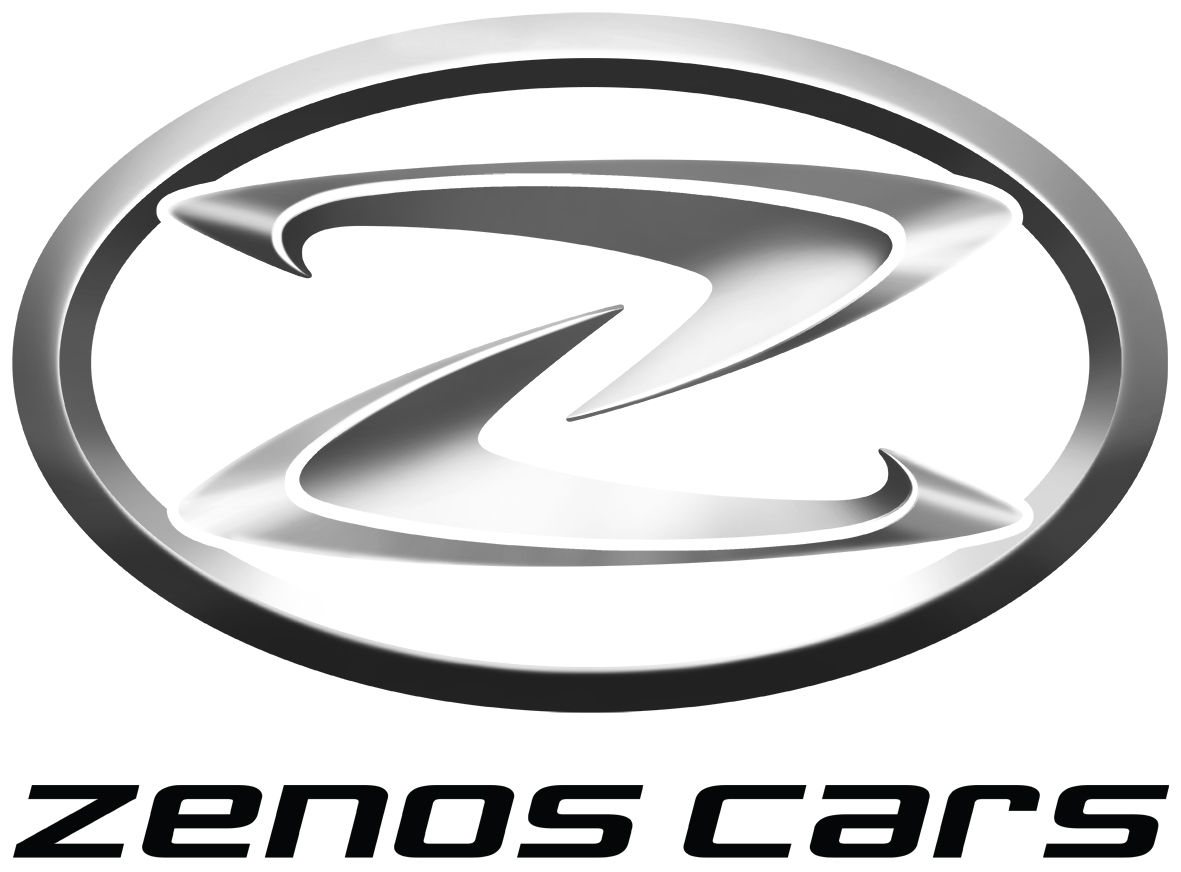
- Company type: Private limited company
- Industry: Automotive
- Founded: 22 May 2012; 13 years ago
- Founders: Ansar Ali; Mark Edwards
- Headquarters: Wymondham, United Kingdom
- Key people: Mark Edwards (Managing Director)
- Products: Sports cars
- Brands: Zenos
- Website: zenoscars.com

Zenos Cars is a British automotive company that produces high-performance, light-weight sports cars. Based in Wymondham, Norfolk, UK, the company designs, manufactures, and sells three variants of the Zenos E10 car. In January 2017, Zenos went into administration with staff made redundant but the assets were purchased by a consortium in March 2017.

== Background ==
The company was founded in Norfolk in 2012. The founders, Ansar Ali and Mark Edwards, had worked together before at Lotus Cars and later at Caterham Cars.

Edwards and Ali believed there was a gap in the market for lightweight, contemporary high-performance sports cars that were affordable to purchase and to run. Before the company’s first product line, the E10 series, was designed, the founders agreed on a price point that would be attractive to potential customers, and determined if a clean-sheet design could be produced and sold at such a level.

The development phase of Zenos’s first series of models included driving days with deposit-holders and potential customers, with the aim of ensuring that drivers and passengers would be both comfortably accommodated and fully engaged.

Matt Windle, Operations Director, joined the company in October 2015, bringing production expertise gained during a seven-year spell as Principal Engineer at Tesla, as well as through his role as Chief Engineer, Body at Caterham Technology and Innovation (CTI), and positions at Lotus Cars, Nissan, Volvo and Daewoo. Chris Weston, Head of Development, played a key role in engineering the car and readying it for production.

On 16 January 2017, following a string of cancelled export orders, Zenos was placed into administration. Begbies Traynor (London) LLP, the administrators, stated they are open to speaking with parties interested in securing the future of the company, and in March 2017 a consortium led by Alan Lubinsky's AC Cars acquired the company and assets.

=== Name ===
The name Zenos is said to be a combination of ‘zen’, representing purity, and ‘os’, which is loosely Latin for 'vertebra' or spine – reflecting one of the key architectural elements of the company’s products.

=== Partners ===
Zenos Cars has used a number of partners in the design and development of its products. They include: Drive – exterior and interior design; Multimatic Technical Centre Europe (MTCE) – chassis design; Ford and Hendy Power – powertrain package supply; Specialist Control Systems – ECU development; Avon Tyres; Alcon Components – brakes and clutches; OZ Racing – wheels; Titan Motorsport – design and production of key components; Bilstein – shock absorbers; and Tillett Racing Seats. Zenos Cars has also received support from the Niche Vehicle Network, and from the New Anglia Local Enterprise Partnership through the Growing Business Fund.

=== Factory and production ===
Zenos Cars are hand-produced in the company’s factory in Wymondham, Norfolk, UK. Production of the Zenos E10 and E10 S began in January 2015. The Zenos E10 R was announced in November 2015, with production starting in January 2016. In September 2016, the company announced that it had built its 100th vehicle, which was an E10 R finished in custom Soul Red colour.

Following the reorganisation of the company in 2017, production ceased in the UK and is planned to move to South Africa and the engineering centre remaining in Norfolk.

=== Sales and network ===
Zenos sports cars are currently sold in the UK, USA, France, The Netherlands, Belgium, Japan, China, Hong Kong, Switzerland, and Italy. Non-UK markets account for 50% of Zenos production.

== Models ==
Zenos produced the E10 between 2015 and 2016.

== See also ==
- List of car manufacturers of the United Kingdom
