= Alan Lubinsky =

South African-born Alan Lubinsky is the current owner of AC Cars, having purchased it from Brian Angliss in 1996, and has produced cars sporadically ever since. In 2009 he moved production to Germany and announced the AC MK VI.

In 2017 he and a consortium acquired Zenos Cars, a small Norfolk-based manufacturer, from administration.
