= AC Cobra GT =

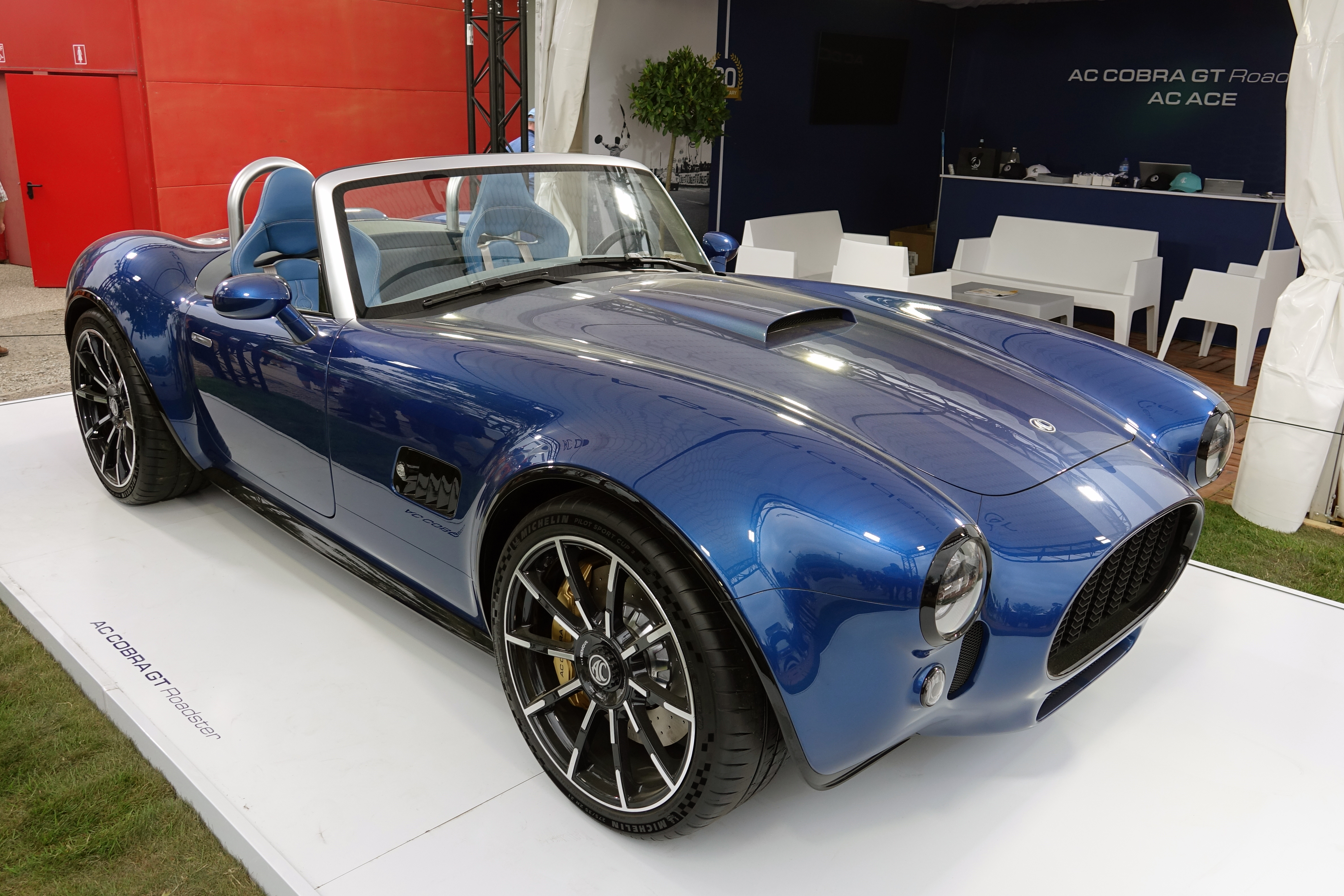
- AC Cobra GT Roadster at Le Mans Classic 2023.

Overview
- Manufacturer: AC Cars
- Production: 2025-present
- Assembly: Thames Ditton, Surrey, England

Body and chassis
- Class: Sports car (S)
- Body style: 2-door roadster
- Layout: FR layout

Powertrain
- Engine: 5.0 L Coyote naturally aspirated or supercharged V8
- Power output: 460 PS (338 kW) (naturally aspirated); 663 PS (488 kW) (supercharged)
- Transmission: 6-speed manual 10-speed automatic

Dimensions
- Wheelbase: 2,570 mm (101.2 in)
- Length: 4,225 mm (166.3 in)
- Width: 1,980 mm (78.0 in)
- Height: 1,290 mm (50.8 in)
- Curb weight: 1,400 kg (3,086 lb)

Chronology
- Predecessor: AC Mk VI GT Roadster

The AC Cobra GT Roadster and AC Cobra GT Coupe are sports cars manufactured by British company AC Cars. It is an iteration of the AC Cobra.

== History ==
The manufacturer announced the Cobra GT Roadster by way of teaser images on 21 December 2022 and it was officially presented on 12 May 2023, at Tottenham Hotspur Stadium in London, England.

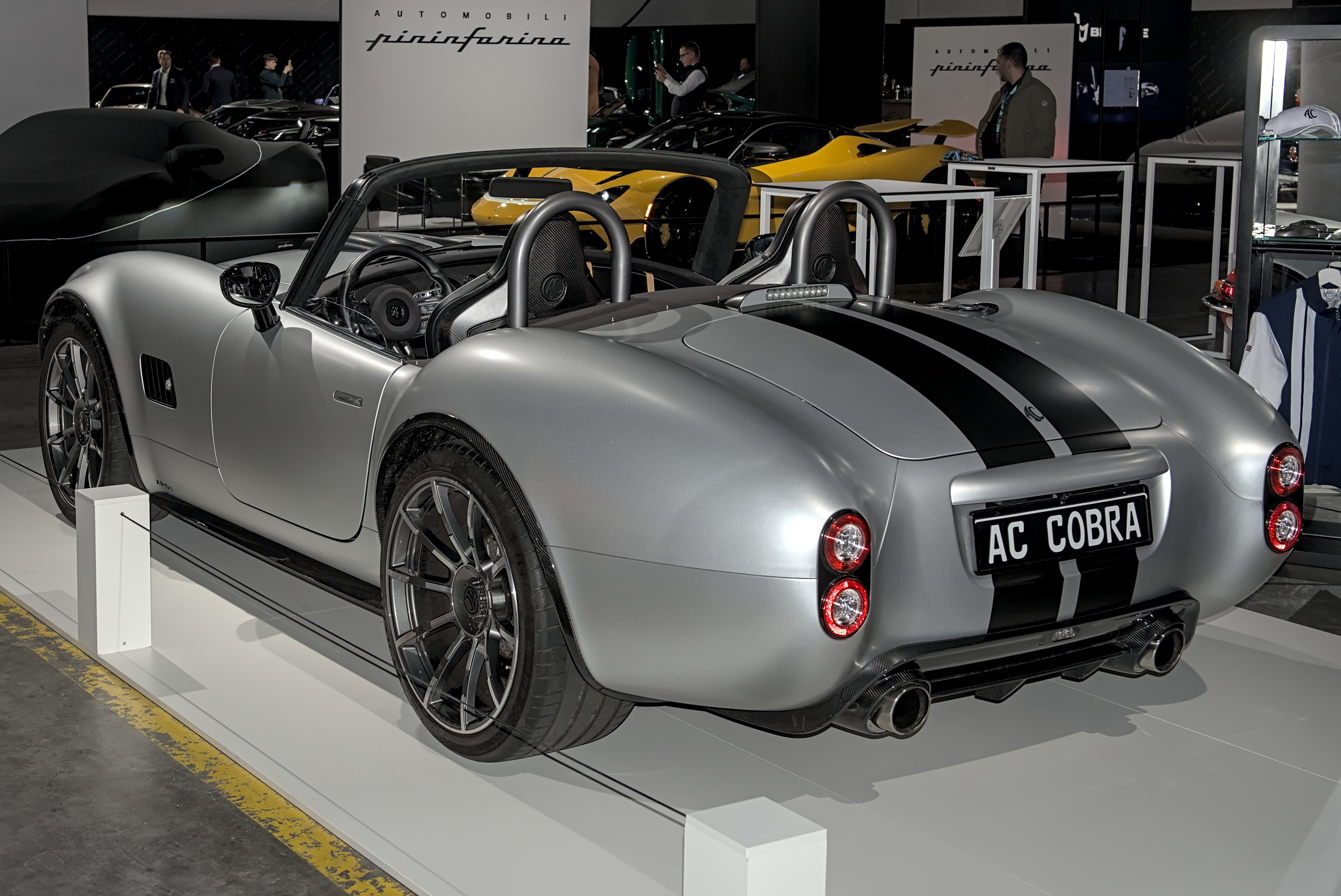
Rear view

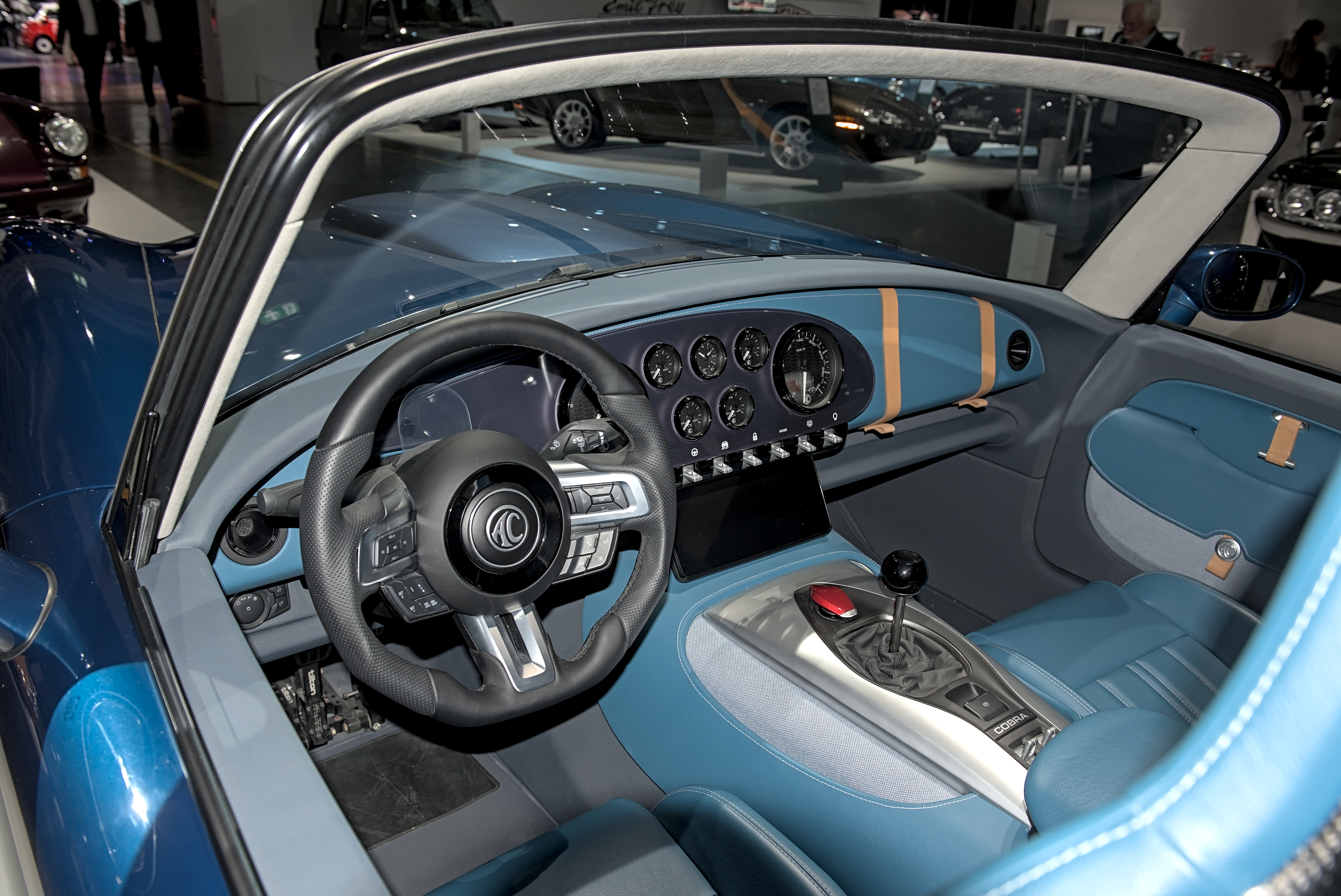
Interior

== Specifications ==
The Cobra GT Roadster has a carbon/composite body placed on an extruded aluminum chassis. It is powered by a 5.0 L Coyote V8 engine from the Ford Mustang, offered either in naturally aspirated form or with a supercharger. The supercharged version produces 663 PS (488 kW; 654 hp) and 780 N⋅m (575 lb⋅ft) of torque.
