= Zenos E10 =

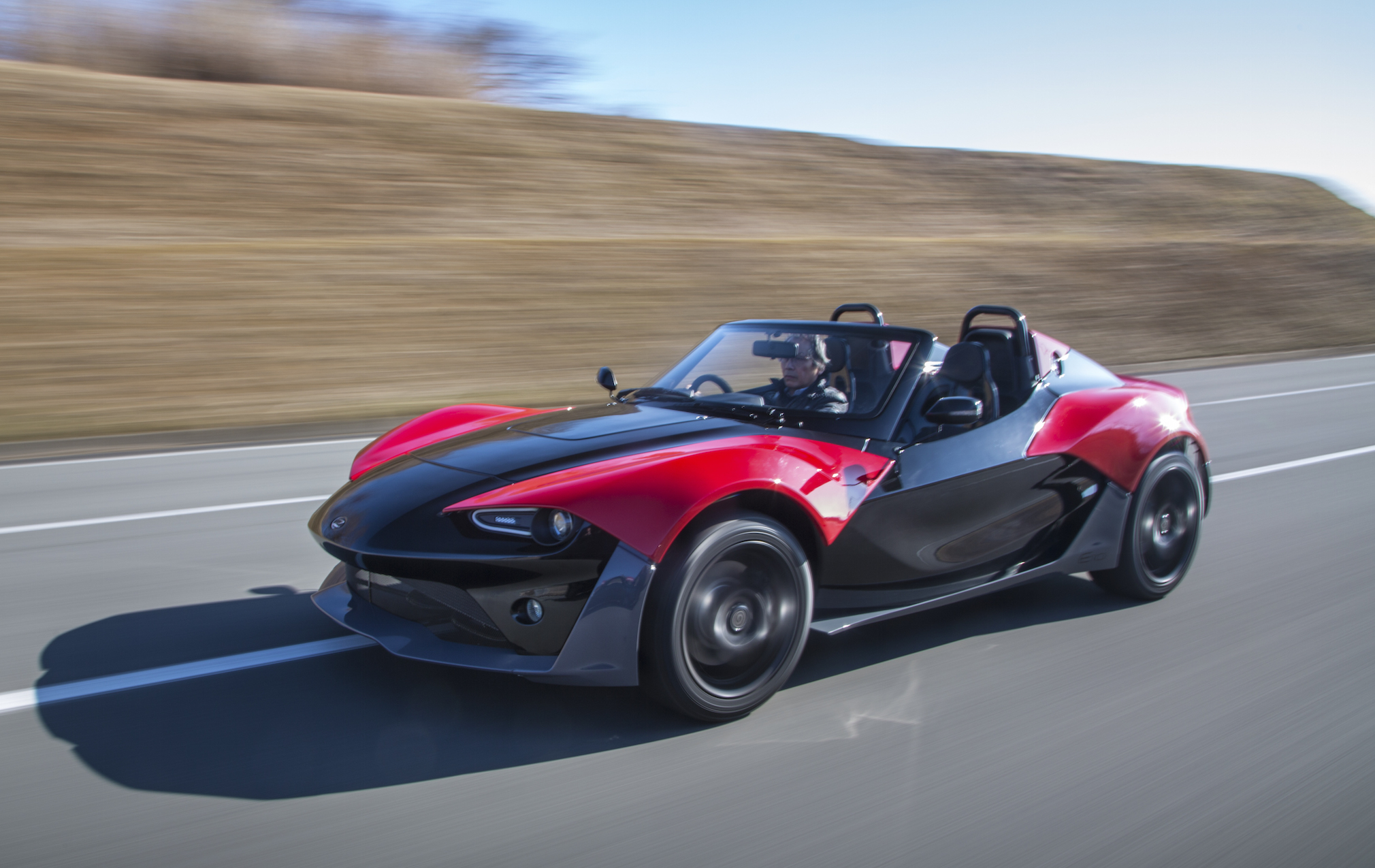

Overview
- Manufacturer: Zenos Cars
- Production: January 2015–2016 (100+ Units)
- Assembly: Wymondham, Norfolk, United Kingdom

Body and chassis
- Class: Sports car (S)
- Body style: 0-door speedster
- Layout: Mid-engine, rear-wheel-drive

Powertrain
- Engine: 2.0 L Ford Ecoboost I4 (petrol); 149 kW (200 bhp) @ 6,800 rpm; 210 N⋅m (155 lbf⋅ft) @ 6,100 rpm; 2.0 L Ford Ecoboost I4 (petrol); 186 kW (250 bhp) @ 7,000 rpm; 400 N⋅m (295 lbf⋅ft) @ 2,500 rpm; 2.3 L Ford Ecoboost I4 (petrol); 261 kW (350 bhp) @ 6,000 rpm; 475 N⋅m (350 lbf⋅ft) @ 4,000 rpm
- Transmission: 5-speed transverse manual

Dimensions
- Wheelbase: 2,300 mm (90.6 in)
- Length: 3,800 mm (149.6 in)
- Width: 1,870 mm (73.6 in)
- Height: 1,130 mm (44.5 in)
- Kerb weight: 720 kg (1,587 lb)

The Zenos E10 is a mid-engined sports car designed and produced by the British manufacturer Zenos Cars. First announced to the press in September 2013, the pre-production car was made available to the press in October 2014.

Production started in Norfolk in January 2015, and ceased at the end of 2016 when the company fell into administration at the start of 2017. The ‘E’ in the car's name is taken from managing director and co-founder Mark Edwards’ surname, while the ‘10’ signifies that this is the 10th car project he has been involved in.

In September 2016, the company announced that it had built its 100th vehicle, which was an E10 R.

Two months after Zenos ceased operations, its assets were purchased by AC Cars. AC initially completed and sold a small number of unfinished E10s but later suspended production. In 2024, the company began reviving the Zenos brand, announcing plans to relaunch it with a new version of the E10, the E10 RZ, scheduled for release in 2026.

== Zenos E10 ==
The car features an aluminium 'spine' to which a composite passenger ‘tub’ and front and rear subframes are attached. The ‘spine’ is believed to be the largest single aluminium extrusion used in any road car, with a torsional stiffness in excess of 10,000 Nm/degree.

The composite ‘tub’ of the E10 is formed of a ‘sandwich’ that comprises a thermoset plastic core contained between sheets of carbon fibre. The latter utilise pieces of carbon fibre that have been discarded in other processes. It is estimated that the resulting material delivers 70% of the mechanical performance of ‘virgin’ carbon fibre at significantly lower cost.

The cabin has been designed to accommodate people from 1.55 m (5 ft 1 in) tall to 1.91 m (6 ft 3 in) tall. The interior also incorporates an additional central screen, allowing the passenger to view information that would normally only be visible to the driver.

The car features inboard front springs and dampers and replaceable GRP body panels, which are intended to reduce repair costs in the event of an accident.

== Zenos E10 S ==
Similar to the E10, but with the turbocharged 2.0 L Ford EcoBoost engine, delivering 186 kW (250 bhp) at 7,000 rpm and 400 N⋅m (295 lbf⋅ft) at 2,500 rpm. Production began at the same time as for the E10.

The E10 S accelerates from 0 to 97 km/h (0 to 60 mph) in 4.0 seconds, and can reach 233 km/h (145 mph)

In September 2016, an upgrade kit was made available for the E10 S, which increases power to 209 kW (280 bhp) and torque to 420 N⋅m (310 lbf⋅ft). The upgrade kit can be fitted to new or used cars and includes new air intake, modified intercooler and remapped ECU.

== Zenos E10 R ==
This car with a higher-powered 2.3 L Ford EcoBoost engine, delivering 261 kW (350 bhp) at 6,000 rpm and 475 N⋅m (350 lbf⋅ft) at 4,000 rpm, was launched at the Performance Car Show, Birmingham, in January 2016.

The E10 R has uniquely tuned suspension and brakes, and the dry vehicle weight of 750 kg (1,653 lb) has been helped by wheels that are each 2.5 kg (5.5 lb) lighter than those fitted to the E10 S.

The car can accelerate from zero to 97 km/h (60 mph) in as little as 3.0 seconds, and reach a top speed of 249 km/h (155 mph). Standard equipment levels are higher than those of the E10 and E10 S, and include six-speed manual gearbox, ventilated disc brakes and uprated four-pot callipers, and twin-skin composite seats with four-point racing harnesses.

== Zenos E10 RZ ==
The Zenos E10 RZ is the upcoming high-performance successor to the original E10 R, under AC Cars. It is powered by a 2.0-litre turbocharged Volvo four-cylinder petrol engine producing 283 kW (380 bhp) and 510 N·m (376 lb·ft), driving the rear wheels through a six-speed manual gearbox.

The RZ is constructed on an aluminium-extruded chassis with a composite tub made from recycled carbon fibre, and continues to use double-wishbone suspension with a pushrod system at the front. The rear subframe has been reworked from aluminium to steel to cope with the higher torque.

Target kerb weight is around 790 kg (1,742 lb), with a projected 0–60 mph (0–97 km/h) time of under 3.0 seconds. The prototype features new carbon-fibre bodywork manufactured by AC Cars in West Sussex and a redesigned interior with new seats, switchgear, and a central display unit.
