= AC Autocarrier =

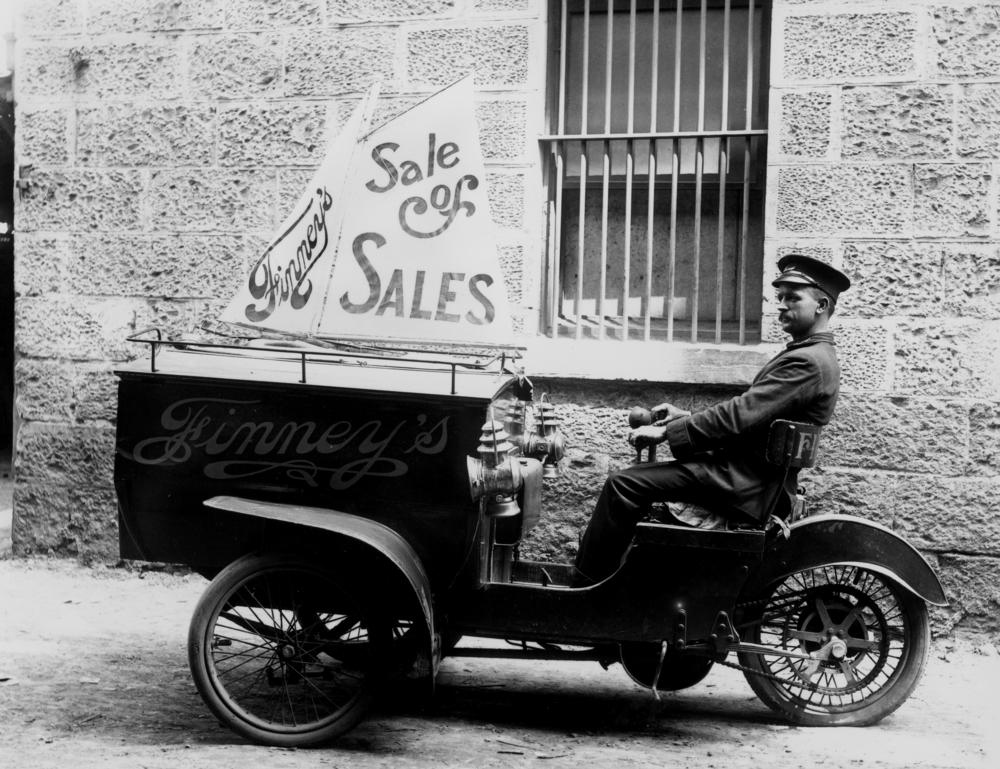
Finney Isles & Company Limited Auto-Carrier

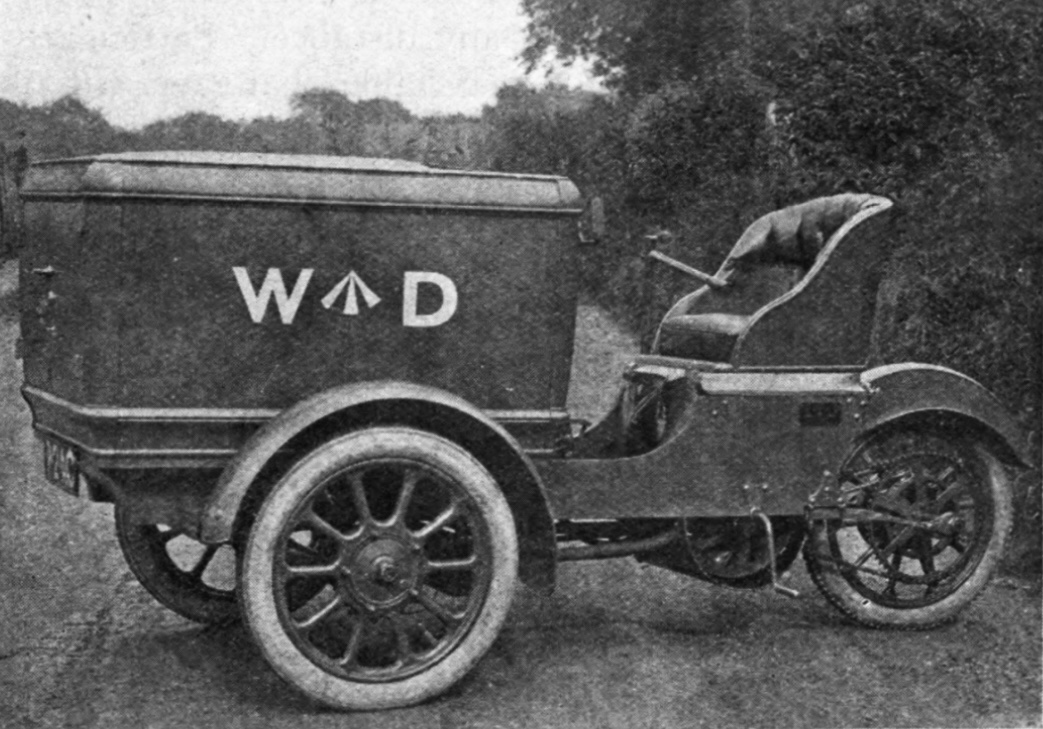
Autocarrier (1904-1914)

The Autocarrier was the first commercial 3-wheeler produced by AC Cars and it was the car that gave the company their name.

== History ==
The Autocarrier was designed and manufactured by John Weller in 1908. It began its life as a three-wheeled delivery van, and it was not uncommon for a company to have a least one Autocarrier to be their delivery van.

== Technical data ==
The Autocarrier was a three-wheeled goods carrier with a single wheel at the rear and driver seated behind the load. A 648 cc single-cylinder air-cooled engine was connected via chain drive to the rear wheel via a two-speed epicyclic gearbox. Some 1,500 were built.

== Models ==
Later in 1908 AC started to change the layout of the Autocarrier and came up with some different models.

=== The Sociable ===
The AC Sociable was an adapted version of the Autocarrier. This new version was designed with a passenger seat in the front, which is where the car's name came from.

The Sociable was also used by the British Army because of their reliability, and special bodywork was fitted so a machine gun could be carried.

In total, as many as 1,800 examples of The Sociable may have been built.

== Later 3-wheeler ==
=== The Petite ===
The Petite was not manufactured until 1953, being a post-World War II economy model. The Petite was powered by a 346cc 2-stroke Villiers engine. The Petite was very different from the other 3-wheeled cars made by AC, being of tricycle (rather than reverse tricycle) configuration, and it had a solid roof whereas the other 3-wheeled cars had at most a folding roof. The model was produced until 1958.

== See also ==
NSU Sulmobil - near-contemporary German 3-wheeler

== See also ==
- AC Cars
- Three-wheeled car
