= AC Brooklands Ace =

British car

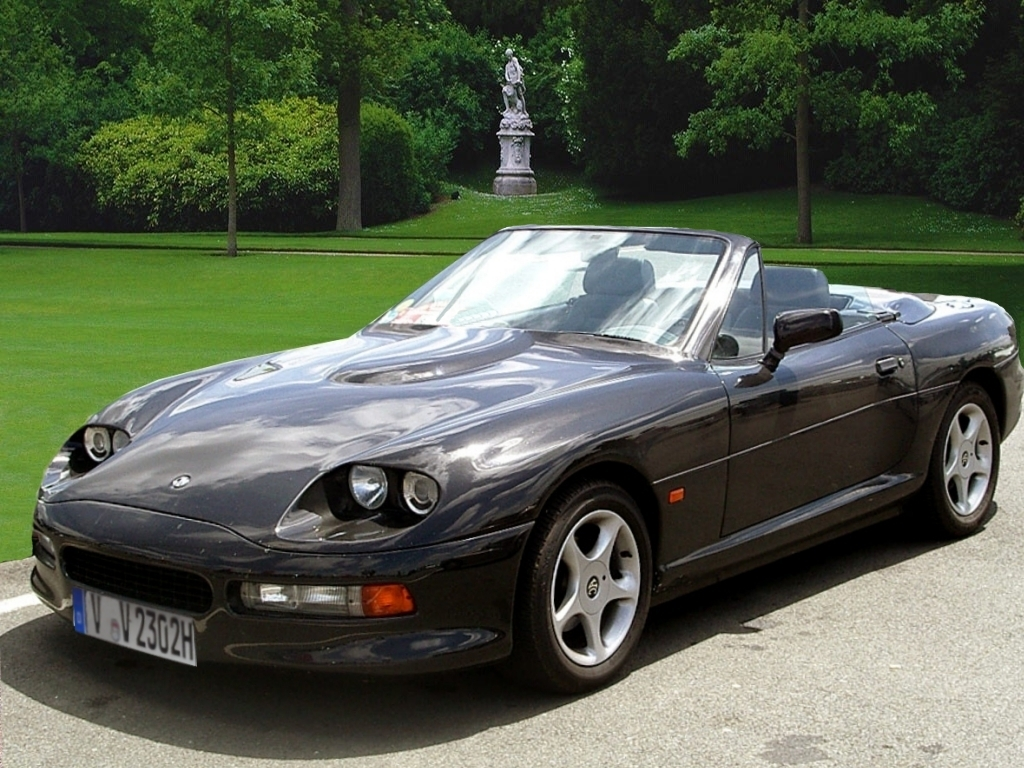
- 1993–1996 generation model

Overview
- Manufacturer: AC Cars
- Production: 1993–2000
- Designer: International Automotive Design (styling); Len Bailey (chassis)

Body and chassis
- Body style: Roadster
- Layout: FR layout

Powertrain
- Engine: 4,942 cc (302 cu in) Ford V8; 4,601 cc Ford V8; 3,506 cc Lotus V8
- Transmission: 5-speed Borg-Warner manual 4-speed Ford automatic

Dimensions
- Wheelbase: 2,472 mm (97.3 in)
- Length: 4,420 mm (174.0 in)
- Width: 1,870 mm (73.6 in)
- Height: 1,300 mm (51.2 in)
- Kerb weight: 1,440 kg (3,175 lb)

The AC Brooklands Ace is a roadster built by the British automotive company AC Cars from 1993 to 2000. It was developed during Brian Angliss’s ownership of the company and launched in 1993 following two previous concept cars of 1986 and 1991, the Brooklands Ace underwent small scale production until 1997 when it received a facelift and reengineering under AC's new owners and was relaunched. The Brooklands Ace did not prove popular, and production ceased in 2000 after a total production run of approximately 58 cars.

== Development ==
The Brooklands Ace traces its history back to the 1986 concept car called the Ace of Spades that featured a high proportion of Ford parts including the 2.9 V6 engine and four-wheel drive system.

The car underwent significant development before reappearing in 1991 with a new design by IAD, a stainless steel chassis and a Ford 3.0 V6 engine. The second prototype was a standard two-seater, dropping the 2+2 design of the Ace of Spades.

== Brooklands Ace (1993–1996) ==
In 1993 the production model was launched, with a new specification and went into small scale production for two years before AC Cars folded in 1996. The production model is powered by a 4.9 L V8 engine from Ford and is shared with the AC Cobra, producing 225 bhp (168 kW; 228 PS). The final version included an electric hood mechanism but the pop-up headlights from the earlier prototype had been abandoned, but the aluminium body was kept. Production ended with 46 of the original versions made between 1993 and 1996, by which time AC Cars had gone into receivership.

== AC Ace (1997–2000) ==
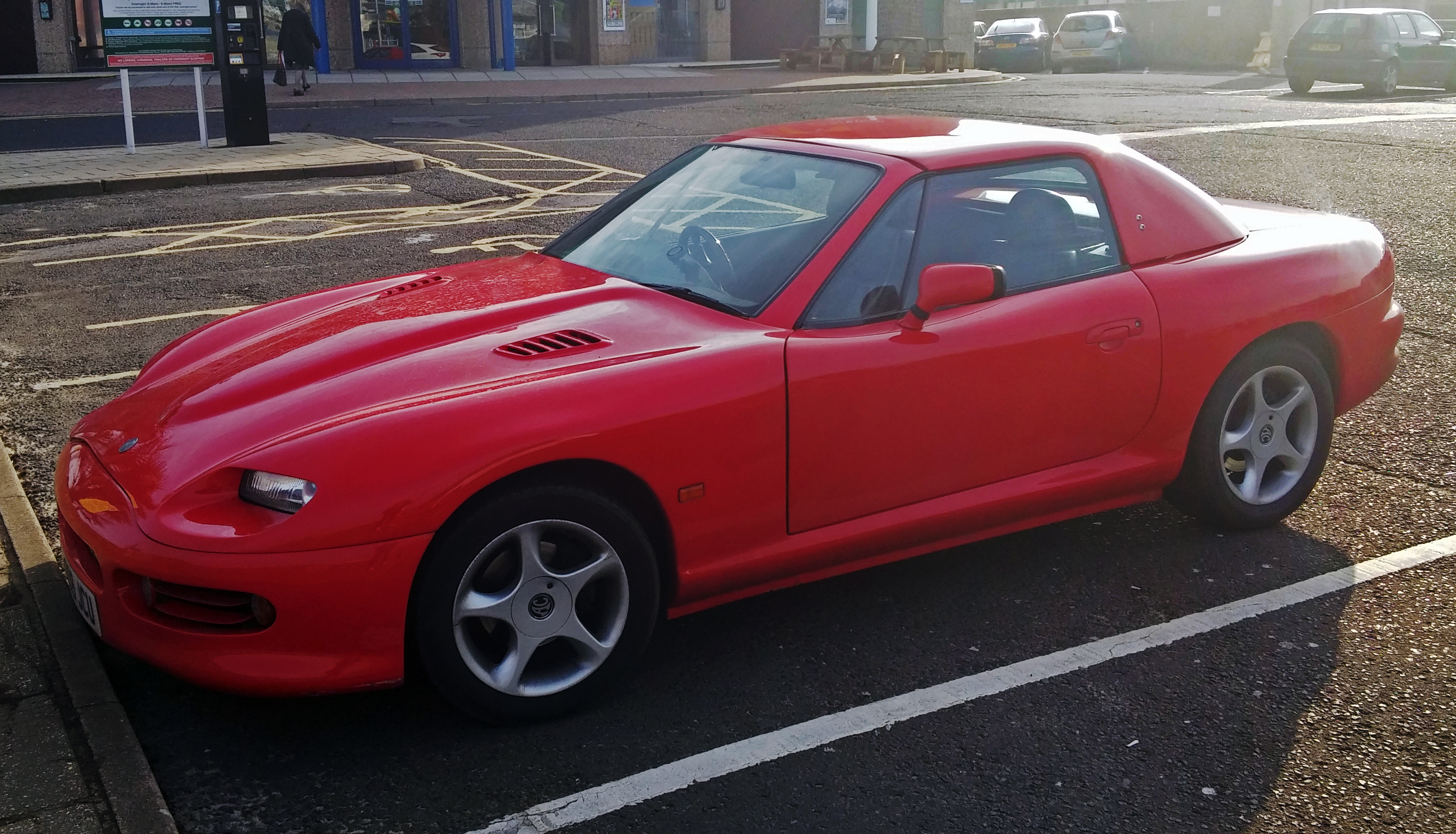
Front three-quarter view of the 1999 Motor Show car (registration date 2010)

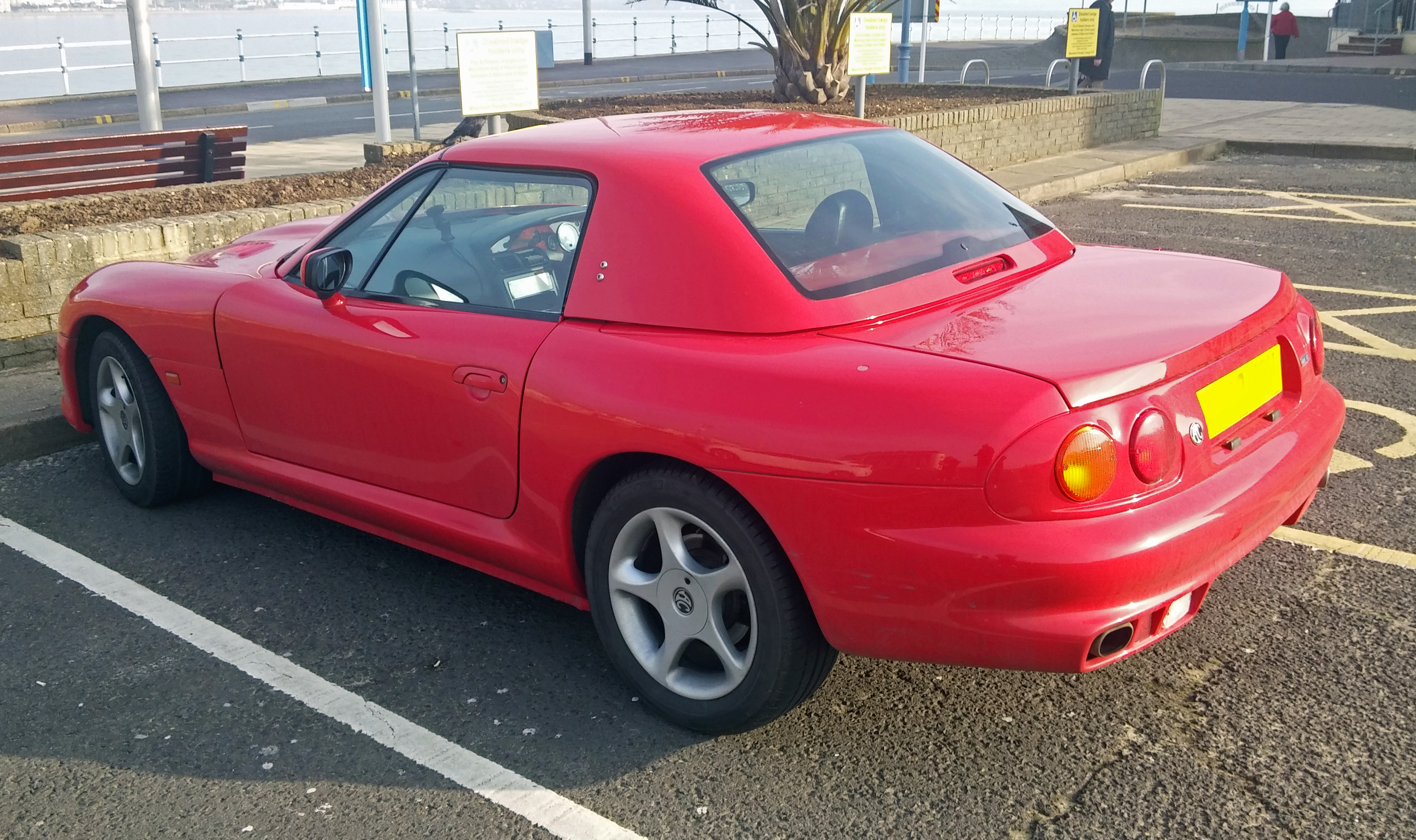
Rear three-quarter view

Under new ownership in 1996, the Brooklands Ace underwent a significant redesign and re-engineering, with a relaunch at the 1997 London Motor Show as the Ace V8, dropping the Brooklands name. Sales started in 1998, but despite the changes, production reached only 12 units before ending in 2000.

The external changes included a significant re-design to the bumpers, grille, lights (now rectangular instead of round), and a new bonnet. As well as production of some elements outsourced to South Africa, final assembly was undertaken in Coventry. A change of some manufacturing techniques to reduce cost and weight was also included in the refreshed design.

The second generation Ace weighs 1,453 kg (3,203 lb), sits on a wheelbase of 2,472 mm (97.3 in) and an overall length of 4,420 mm (174.0 in). The engine range was increased with two 5.0 L V8 options, in 240 bhp (179 kW; 243 PS) and 320 bhp (239 kW; 324 PS) V8 supercharged variations; a 4.6 litre 320 bhp (239 kW; 324 PS) V8 32-valve fuel injected quad cam engine, and a Lotus 3.5 V8 producing 251 bhp (187 kW; 254 PS). The 1999 London Motor Show car was originally fitted with the Lotus engine, but as it was never operational a 4.6-litre Cobra engine was later installed. A four-seater version called the AC Aceca, reviving an old AC model name, was also launched with the 4.6 L V8 engine. The 5.0 V8 achieved a top speed of 135 mph (217.3 km/h) and could accelerate from 0 to 60 in 6.9 seconds. The supercharged 5.0 could reach 155 mph (249.4 km/h) and accelerate to 60 mph in 5.5 seconds.
