= AC 2-Litre =

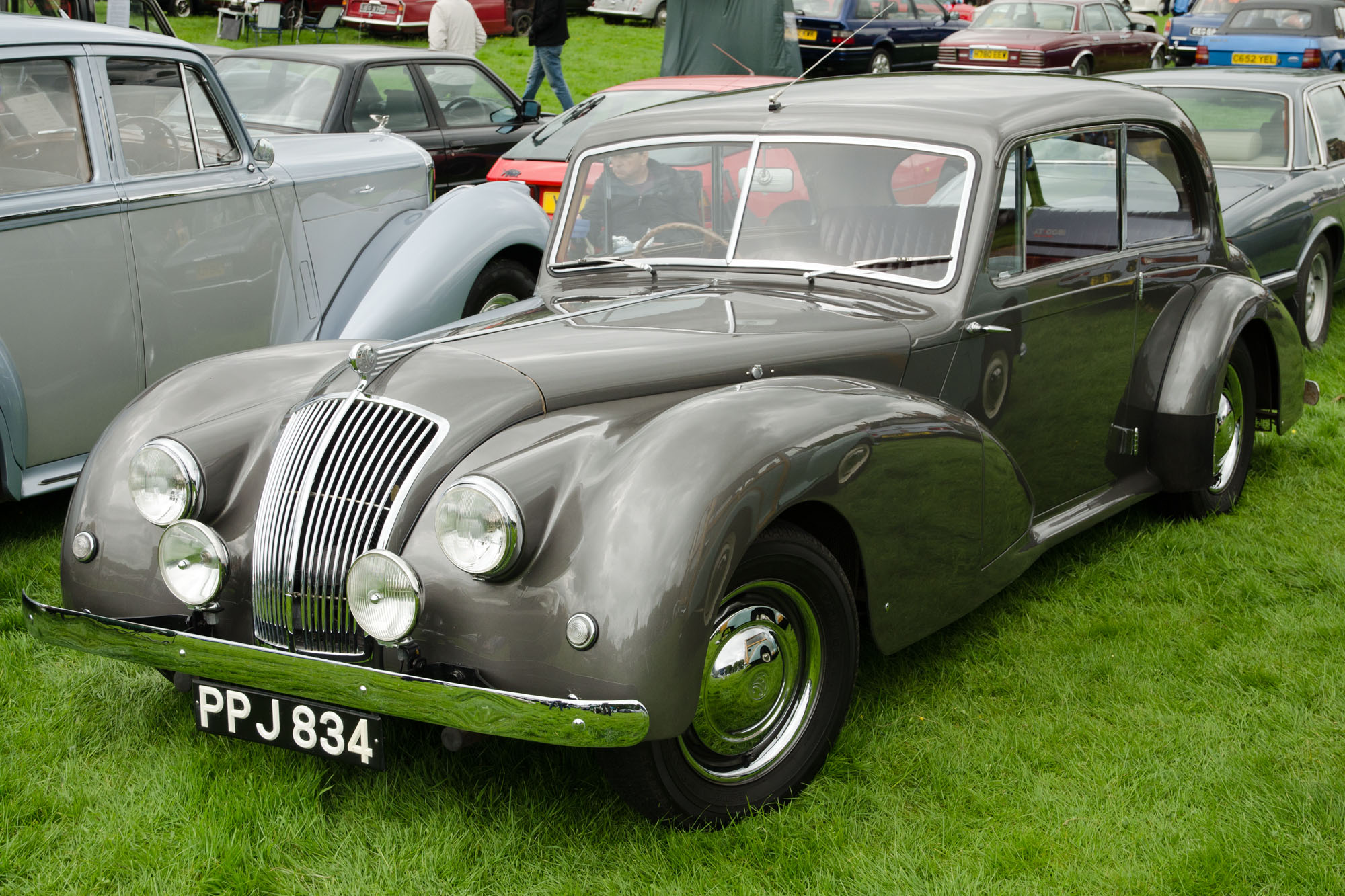
- AC 2-Litre 2 Door Saloon of 1951

Overview
- Manufacturer: AC
- Production: 1947–1956; 1,284 produced
- Assembly: Thames Ditton, Surrey, England

Body and chassis
- Body style: 2 -door / 4-door saloon, drophead coupé, tourer
- Layout: FR layout

Powertrain
- Engine: 1991 cc I6 ohc 74 bhp (55.2 kW)/76 bhp (56.7 kW)
- Transmission: 4-speed manual

Dimensions
- Wheelbase: 117 in (2,972 mm)
- Length: 184 in (4,674 mm)
- Width: 67 in (1,702 mm)
- Height: 61 in (1,549 mm)
- Curb weight: 2,912 lb (1,321 kg)

The AC 2-Litre is an automobile that was produced by AC of Thames Ditton in Surrey, England between 1947 and 1956. Two and, from 1952, four-door saloons were sold. In addition, as from 1949, a small number of drophead coupés and "Buckland" tourers were produced.

The car's wetliner, aluminium cylinder block, six-cylinder 1991 cc engine was the unit first offered by the company in the AC 16, back in 1922. However, by 1947 the engine was fed by three SU carburettors, and boasted a power output of 74 bhp (55.2 kW), increased again in 1951 to 85 bhp (63.4 kW) which was more than twice the 35 bhp (26.1 kW) claimed for engine's original commercial application.

The aluminium-panelled body on a wood frame was fitted to a conventional steel chassis with rigid axles front and rear with semi-elliptic leaf springs with, for the first time on an AC, hydraulic dampers. Until 1951 the car had a hybrid braking system, hydraulic at the front and cable at the rear with 12 in (305 mm) drums.

The car changed very little during its ten-year production run, though the wheel size did increase slightly to 16 in (406 mm) in 1951. The AC 2-litre was outlived by its engine, which continued to be offered in other AC models until 1963.

A 2-door saloon car tested by The Motor magazine in 1948 had a top speed of 80 mph (130 km/h) and could accelerate from 0-60 mph (97 km/h) in 19.9 seconds. A fuel consumption of 23 miles per imperial gallon (12 L/100 km; 19 mpg_{‑US}) was recorded. The test car cost £1277 including taxes.

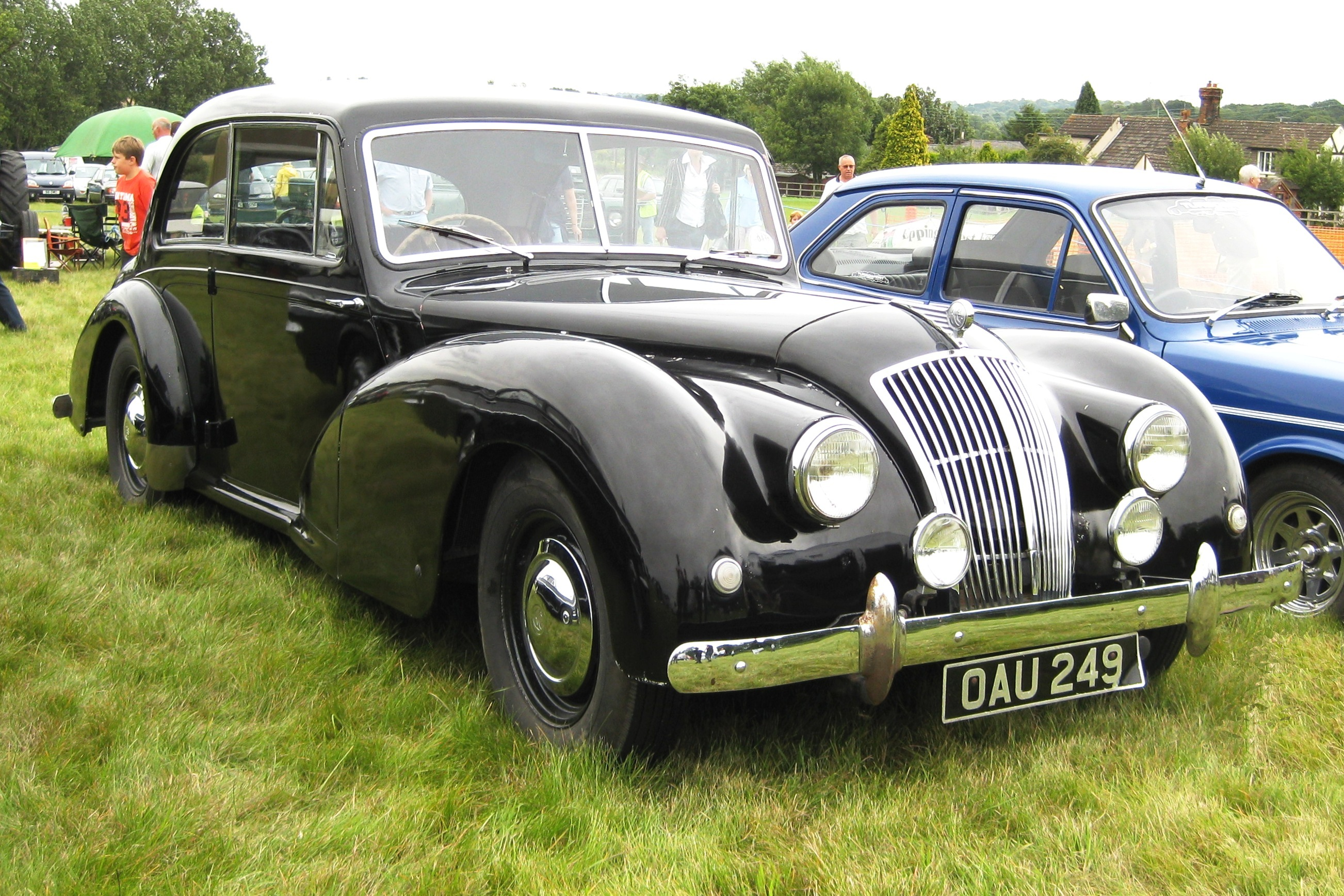
2 Door Saloon (circa 1955)

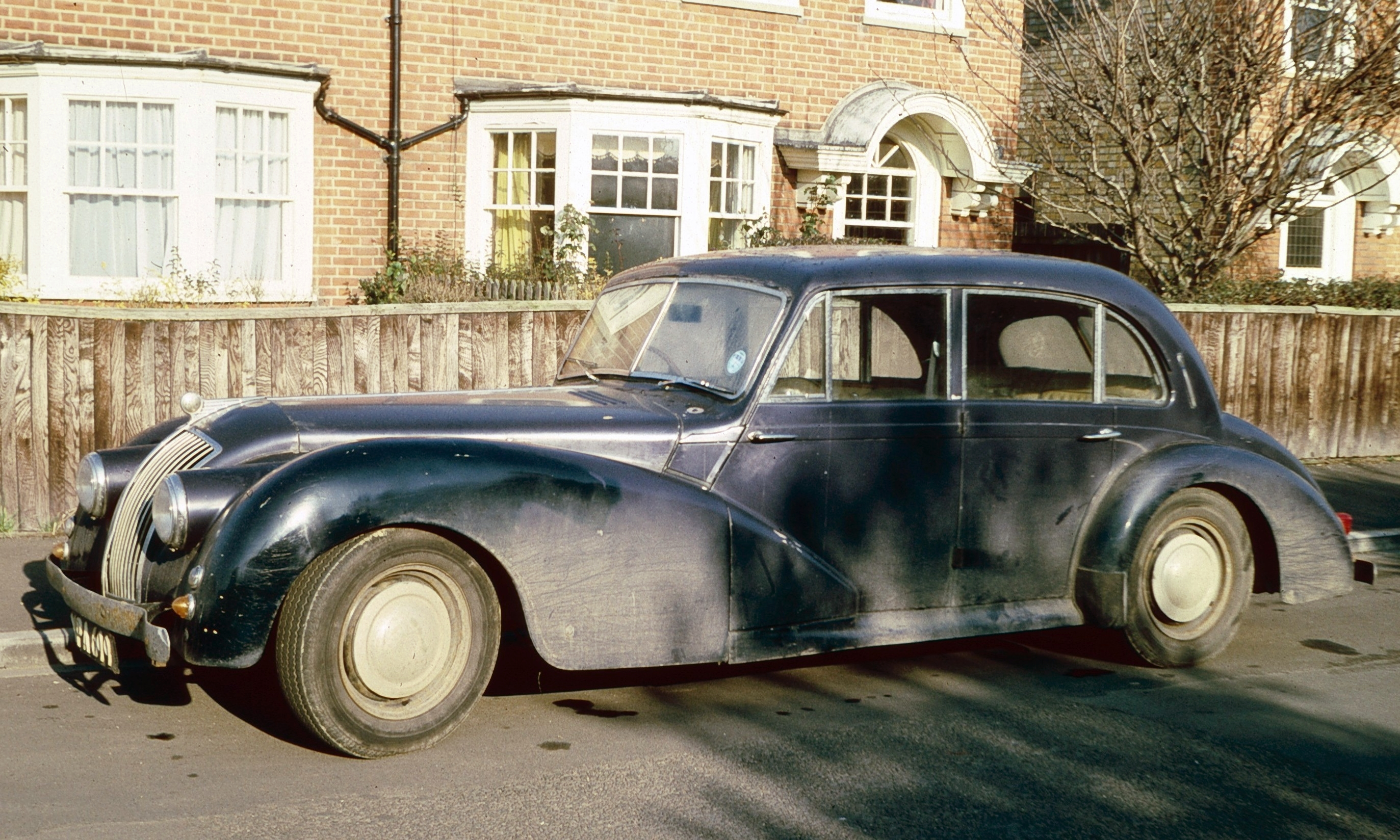
4 Door Saloon

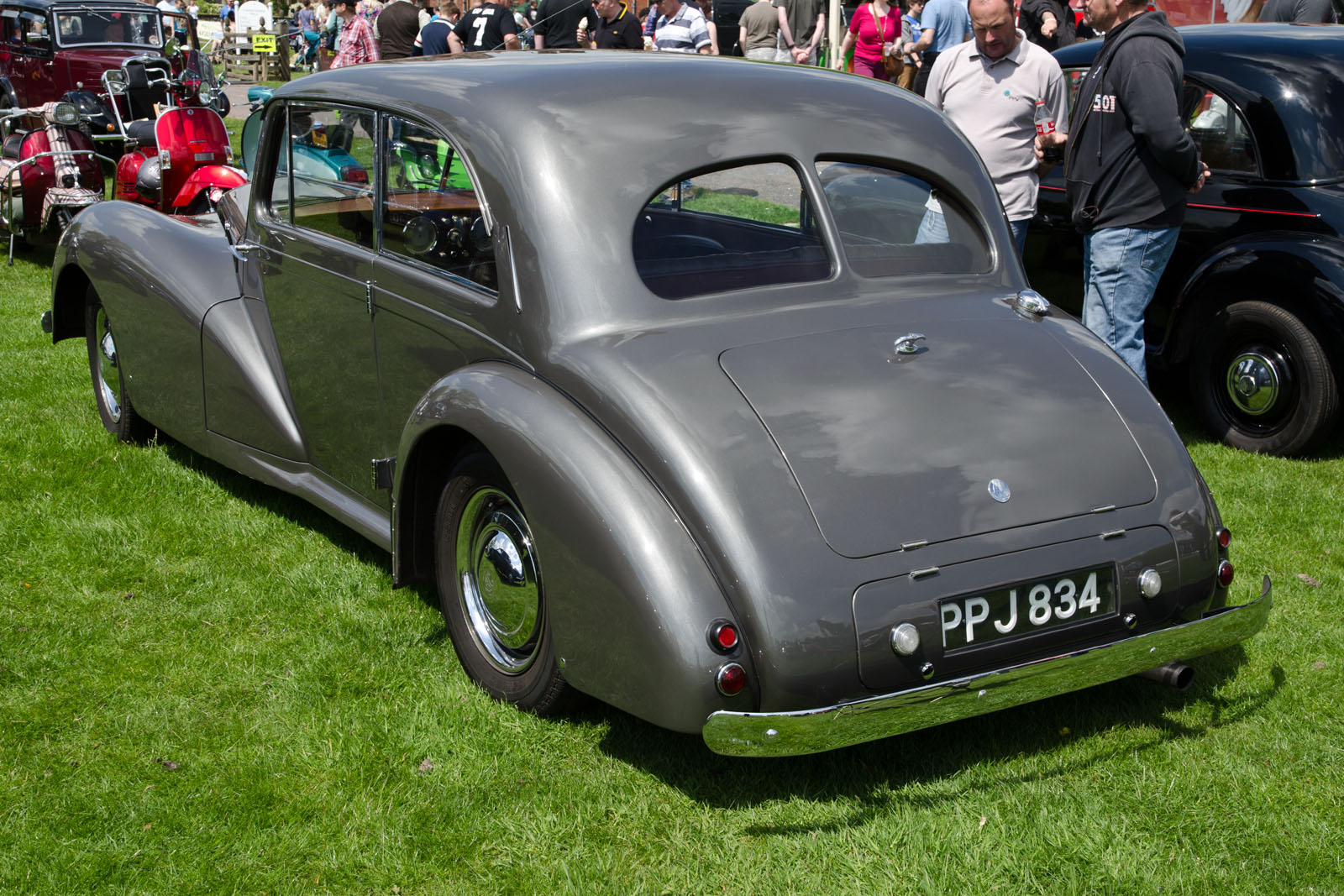
rear of 2 door saloon 1951
