= AC MK VI =

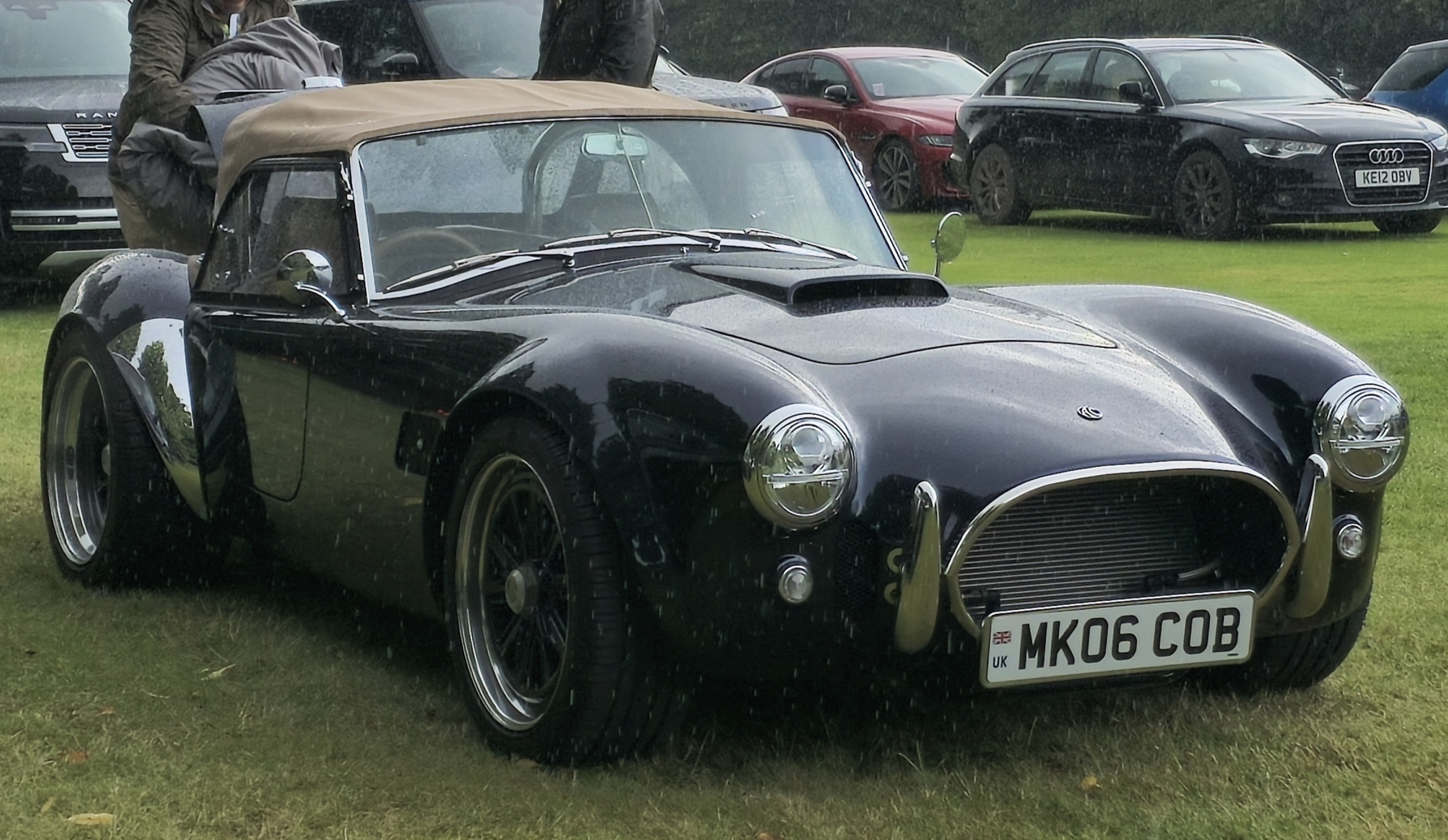

Overview
- Manufacturer: Gullwing GmbH
- Production: 2009–present
- Assembly: Heyda, Germany

Body and chassis
- Class: Sports car (S)
- Body style: 2-door coupé 2-door Roadster (MK VI GTSR)
- Layout: FR layout

Powertrain
- Engine: 6.2 L Corvette LS3 naturally-aspirated V8
- Power output: GT 437 hp (326 kW; 443 PS); GTA 550 hp (410 kW; 558 PS); GTS 647 hp (482 kW; 656 PS); GTSR 809 hp (603 kW; 820 PS)
- Transmission: 6-speed manual

Dimensions
- Curb weight: 1,050 kg (2,310 lb) (GT); 1,095 kg (2,414 lb) (GT Big Block); 1,080 kg (2,380 lb) (GTS); 995 kg (2,194 lb) (GTSR)

Chronology
- Predecessor: AC MK V
- Successor: AC Cobra GT Coupe (MK VI Coupe); AC Cobra GT Roadster (MK VI Roadster)

The AC Mark VI (stylized as MK VI) is a sports car manufactured by British company AC Cars and an iteration of AC Cars' classic Ace and Cobra sports cars. This is the third vehicle of the series to not feature the name "Cobra", due to the fact Ford Motor Company had trademarked the name.

The AC MK VI is the first version of the vehicle to be built in Germany (the MK V has been built in Malta), the first to use a V8 engine manufactured by GM (the AC 212 S/C had a Lotus engine), the first to be available in a coupé version that was not designed specifically for racing and the first version to feature gullwing doors in its coupé form.

The vehicle will be manufactured by former Gullwing GmbH in Heyda in Germany (eventually assembled by Hi-Tech Automotive in South Africa).

== Introduction ==
The MK VI was first introduced on April 16, 2009 at the Top Marques Car Show in Monaco. Later prototypes have been shown at the Geneva Motor Show in 2011 and 2012.

== Specifications ==
The company is responsible for the design of the coupe version's roof structure and gullwing doors (available as from 2014). The vehicle will feature an aluminium-hybrid body mounted onto a fully-triangulated, jig-welded roundtube spaceframe chassis to maximize strength and minimizing weight while still keeping production costs reasonable. Power will come from a specially tuned, 6.162 litre/376 cui LS3 Corvette engine delivering 437 bhp (326 kW) in "GT" trim and 550 bhp (410 kW) in "GTA" trim, which is said to meet emissions standards across Europe and in North America, which will be the MK VI's primary markets. Also featured are powerful, 6-piston (front) resp. 4-piston (rear) brakes manufactured by GM and a variable, power locking limited-slip differential.

Total weight is said to be 1,020 kg in GT trim, and 1,045 kg in GTA trim, AC representatives say that the car can hit 100 km/h in approximately 3.7 seconds (GT trim) resp. 3.5 seconds (GTA trim).
