= AC Cars =

British specialist automobile manufacturer

AC Cars (EU) Ltd
- 2022 Logo from AC Cars
- Type: Private
- Industry: Automotive
- Founded: West Norwood, London, England (1901; 125 years ago)
- Founders: The Weller brothers
- Headquarters: Donington Park, Derby, England, UK
- Key people: David Conza, CEO; Alan Lubinsky, Chairman
- Products: Automobiles
- Brands: AC Cobra, AC Ace. AC Aceca, AC Greyhound
- Website: ac.cars

AC Cars, originally incorporated as Auto Carriers Ltd., is a British specialist automobile manufacturer and one of the oldest independent car makers founded in Britain. As a result of the bad financial conditions over the years, the company was renamed or liquidated many times until its latest form. In 2022, the new corporate structure began the production of new AC Cobra models, with a slightly modified structure to adapt it to modern safety and technology requirements and obtain the European road homologation certificate.

== History ==
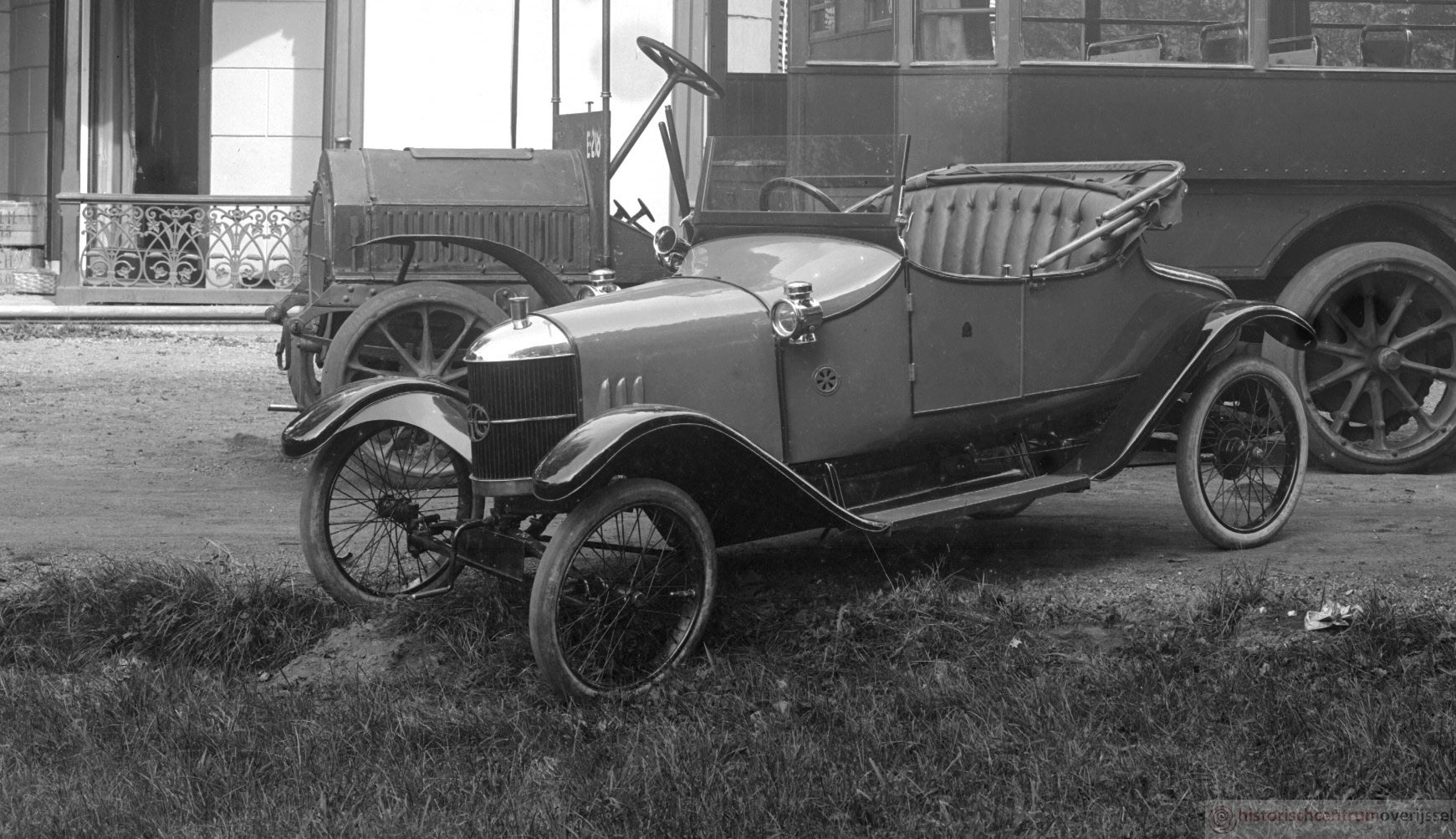
AC 10 open 2-seater AC's first 4-wheeled car

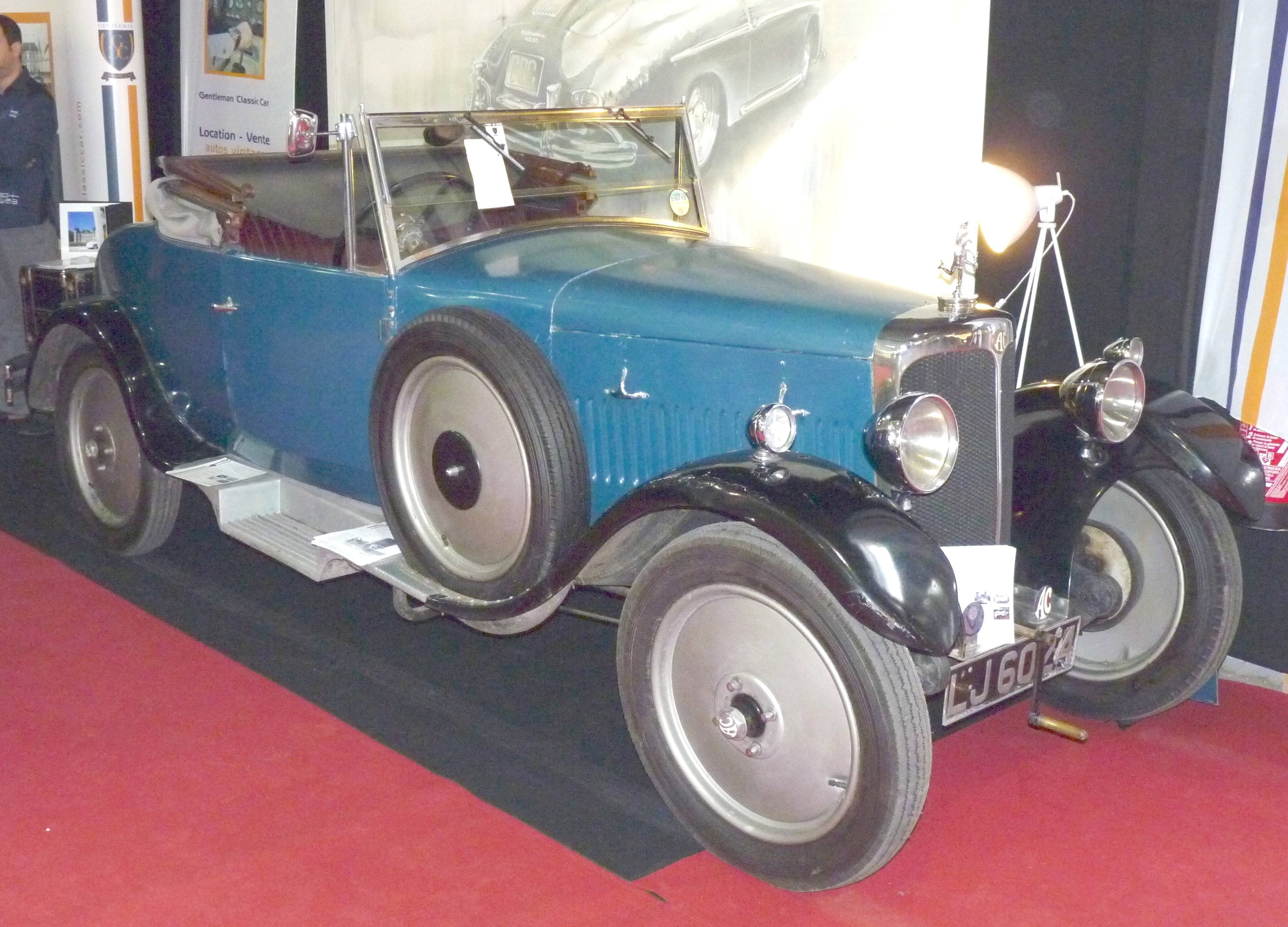
AC 12 Royal drophead coupé 1926

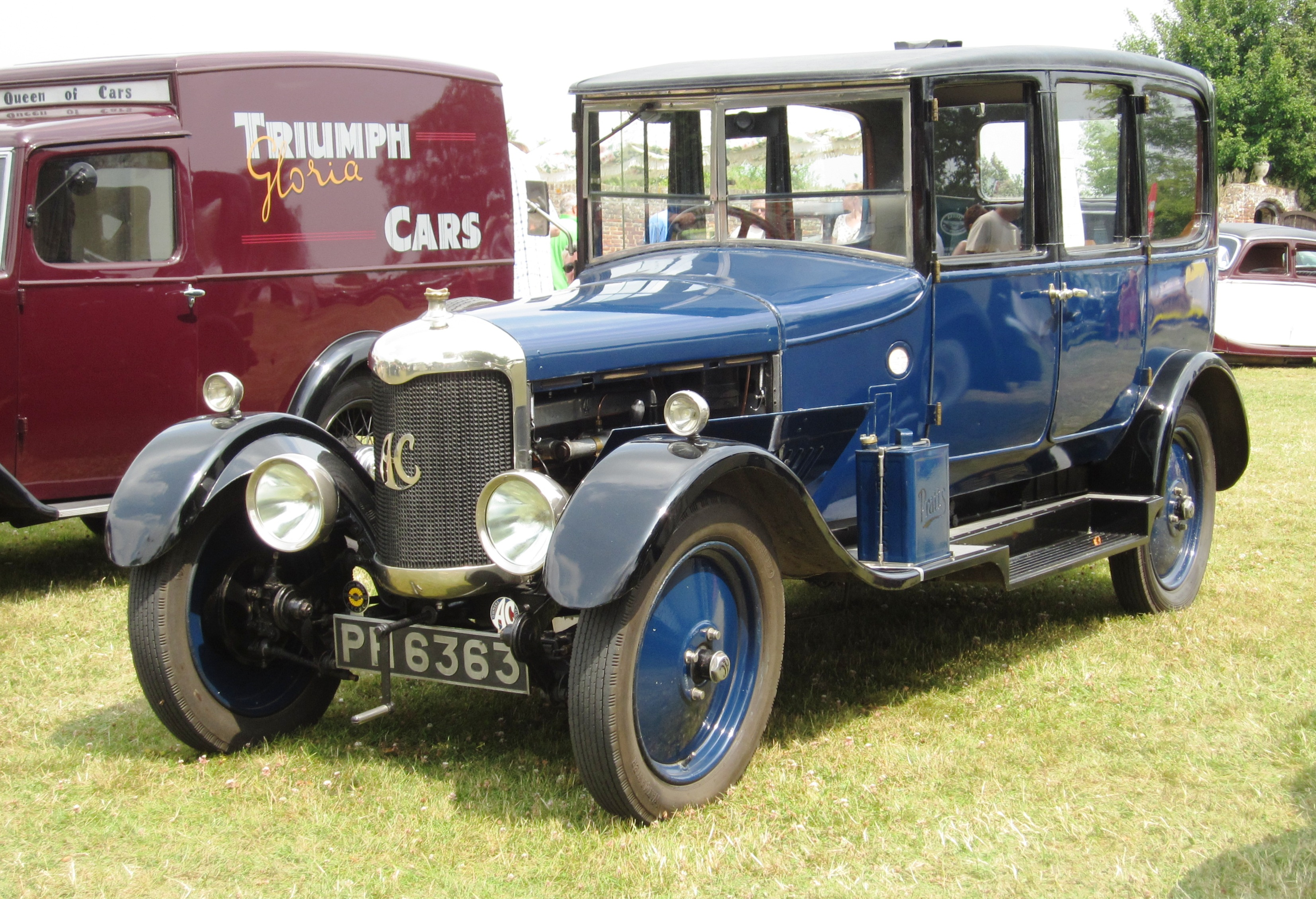
AC 16 Royal saloon 1927

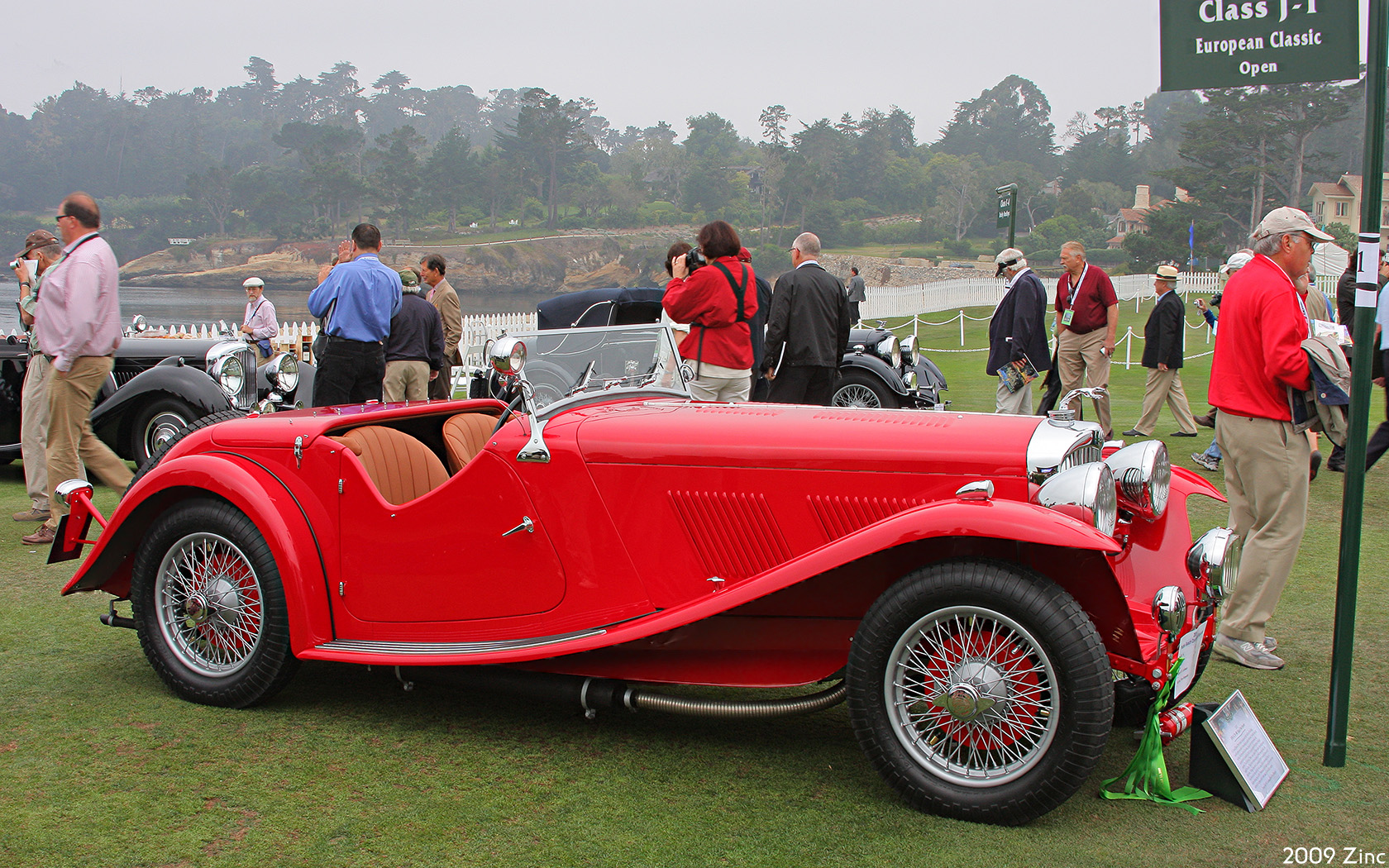
AC 16/80 open 2-seater 1939 body by March

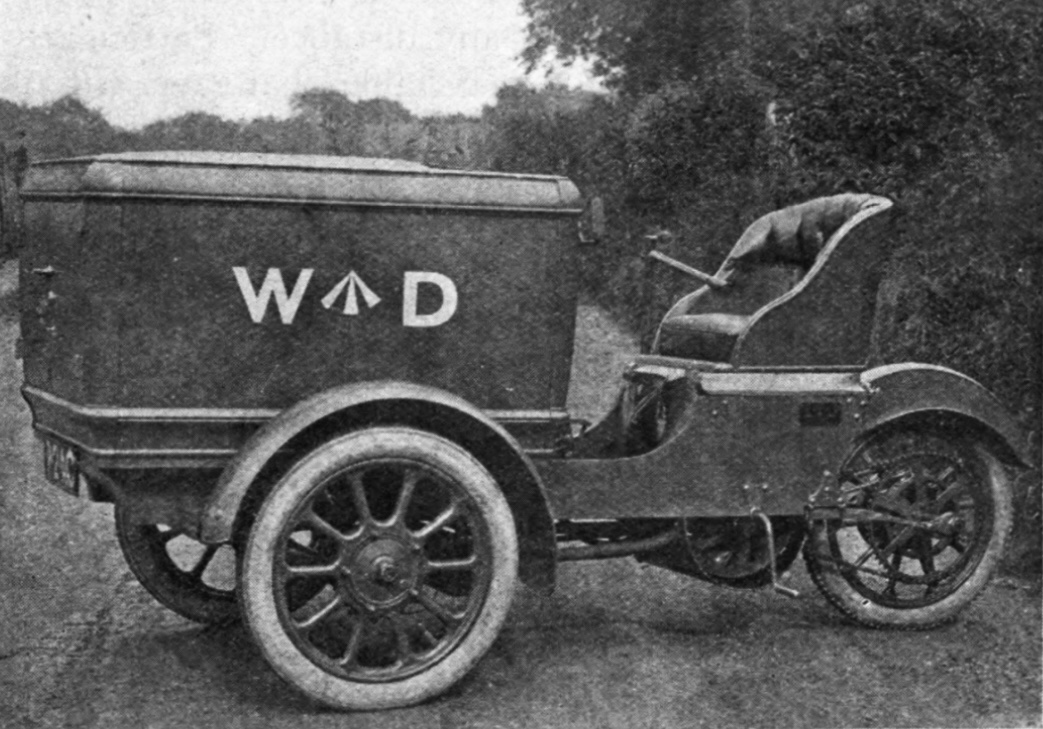
Autocarrier (1904-1914)

=== The Weller brothers prototype ===
The first car from the company that eventually became AC was presented at the Crystal Palace motor show in 1903; it was a 20 HP touring car and was displayed under the Weller name. The Weller brothers of West Norwood, London, planned to produce an advanced 20 hp (15 kW) car.

However, their financial backer and business manager John Portwine, a butcher, thought the car would be too expensive to produce and encouraged Weller to design and produce a little delivery three-wheeler.

=== Autocars and Accessories ===
In 1904, a new company was founded and named Autocars and Accessories; production started with the Auto-Carrier. The vehicle caught on quickly and was a financial success. Three years later, a passenger version appeared, called the A.C. Sociable. It had a seat in place of the cargo box.

The A.C. Sociable was described in a review of the 1912 Motor Cycle and Cycle Car Show as "one of the most popular cycle cars on the road, both for pleasure and business", and A.C. displayed eight vehicles on their stand, six for pleasure and two for business. The single rear wheel contained a two-speed hub, and the single-cylinder engine was mounted just in front of it, with rear chain drive.

=== Auto Carriers Ltd. ===
The company became Auto Carriers Ltd. in 1911 and moved to Ferry Works, Thames Ditton, Surrey — at this time, they also began using the famed "AC" roundel logo. They continued to produce the commercial 3-wheeler tricars and the A.C. Sociable now frequently referred to in their adverts as the Mighty Atom. Their first four-wheeled car was produced in 1913; it was a sporty two-seater with a gearbox on the rear axle. Only a few were built before production was interrupted by the First World War. During the First World War, the Ferry Works factory produced shells and fuses for the war effort, although at least one vehicle was designed and built for the War Office.

At the end of the war, Auto Carriers started making motor vehicles again, designing and building many successful cars at Ferry Works, as well as expanding into an old balloon factory on Thames Ditton High Street. Shortly thereafter, John Weller started on the design of a new overhead-cam six-cylinder engine. The first versions of this design were running by 1919. The Weller engine would be produced until 1963.

In 1921, Selwyn Edge (who had previously been with Napier) bought shares in the company, and was subsequently appointed governing director. He did not get along with Weller or Portwine, who resigned less than a year later. In customary fashion, Edge sought publicity for the company through motoring competition.

In 1921 Sammy Davis joined A.C. as a driver, competing in the Junior Car Club 200-mile (320 km) race, for cars up to 1,500cc, at Brooklands.

=== AC Cars Ltd. ===
In 1922, the name changed again to AC Cars Ltd. In 1923 and 1924, J.A. Joyce won the Brighton Speed Trials driving an AC. In May 1924, at Montlhéry near Paris, T.G. Gillett broke the continuous 24-hour record in a 2-litre AC, fitted with special streamlined bodywork, covering a distance of 1,949.3 miles. In 1926, the Honourable Victor Bruce, an AC employee, won the Monte Carlo Rally in his 2-litre AC. In 1927, Victor Bruce, with his wife Mildred (Mrs Victor Bruce), assisted by J.A. Joyce, set a 10-day endurance record at Montlhéry, driving an AC Six. Nevertheless, the sales started to fall.

=== AC (Acedes) Ltd. ===
Selwyn Edge bought the company outright for £135,000 in 1927 and re-registered it as AC (Acedes) Ltd., but sales, which had been falling, continued to decline. The company was caught by the crash of 1929 and went into voluntary liquidation.

Production ceased for a time, and the company was sold to the Hurlock family who ran a successful haulage business. They wanted the High Street factory only as a warehouse (Ferry Works was not acquired), but allowed the service side of AC to continue.

A single car was made for William Hurlock in 1930. He liked it and agreed to restart very limited production using components left over from previous models.

An agreement was reached with Standard to supply new chassis, the ancient three-speed transaxle was replaced by a modern four-speed gearbox (built in unit with the engine), and by 1932 a new range of cars was launched. Production continued on a small scale, averaging less than 100 vehicles per year, until the outbreak of the Second World War in 1939. The final pre-war car was delivered in June 1940, after which the factory was fully involved with war production.

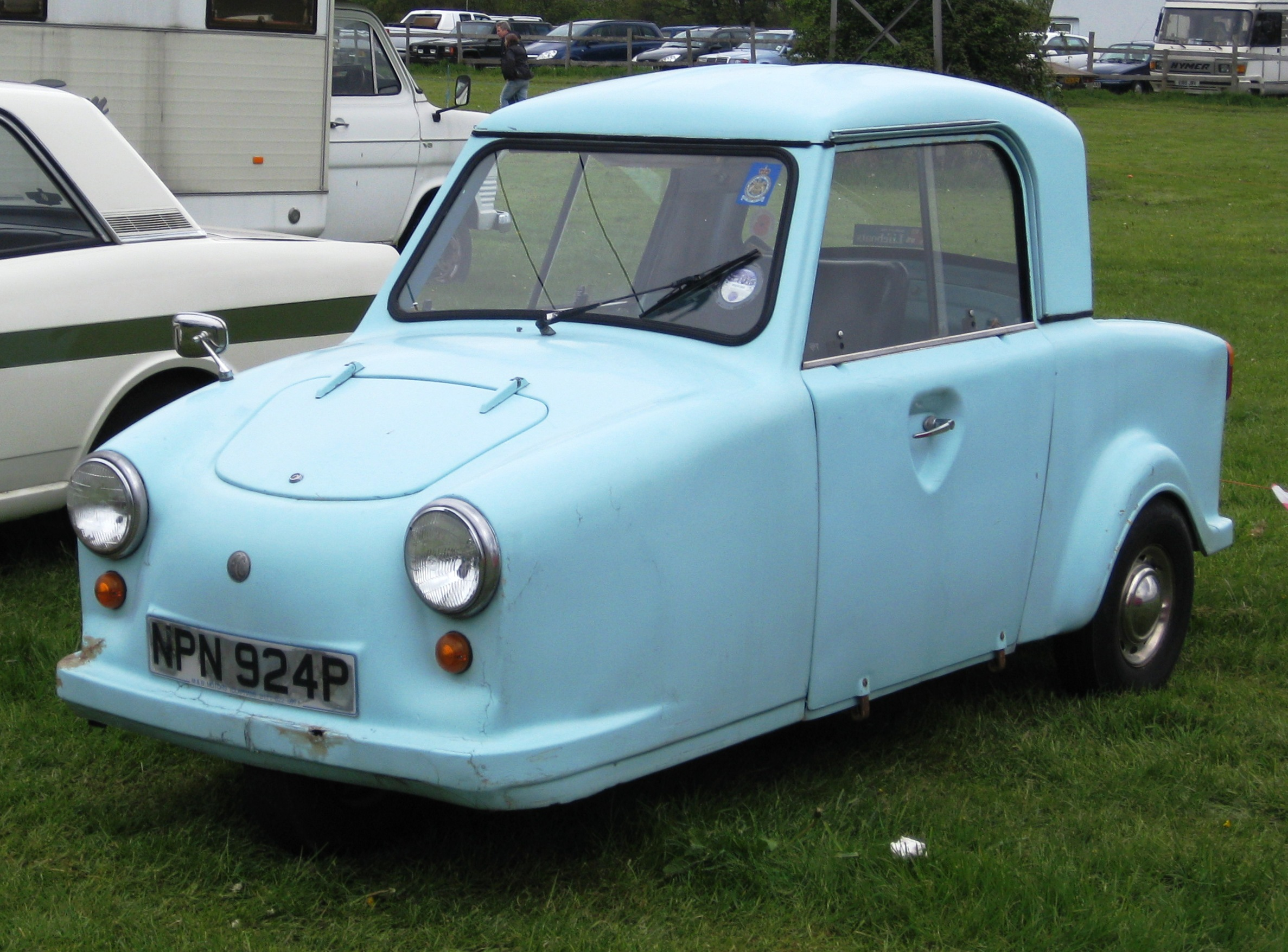
While the company's sporting cars won plaudits from many enthusiasts, it was the long-running contract with the UK government for the production of three-wheeled invalid carriages that may have most impressed those concerned for the company's financial stability.

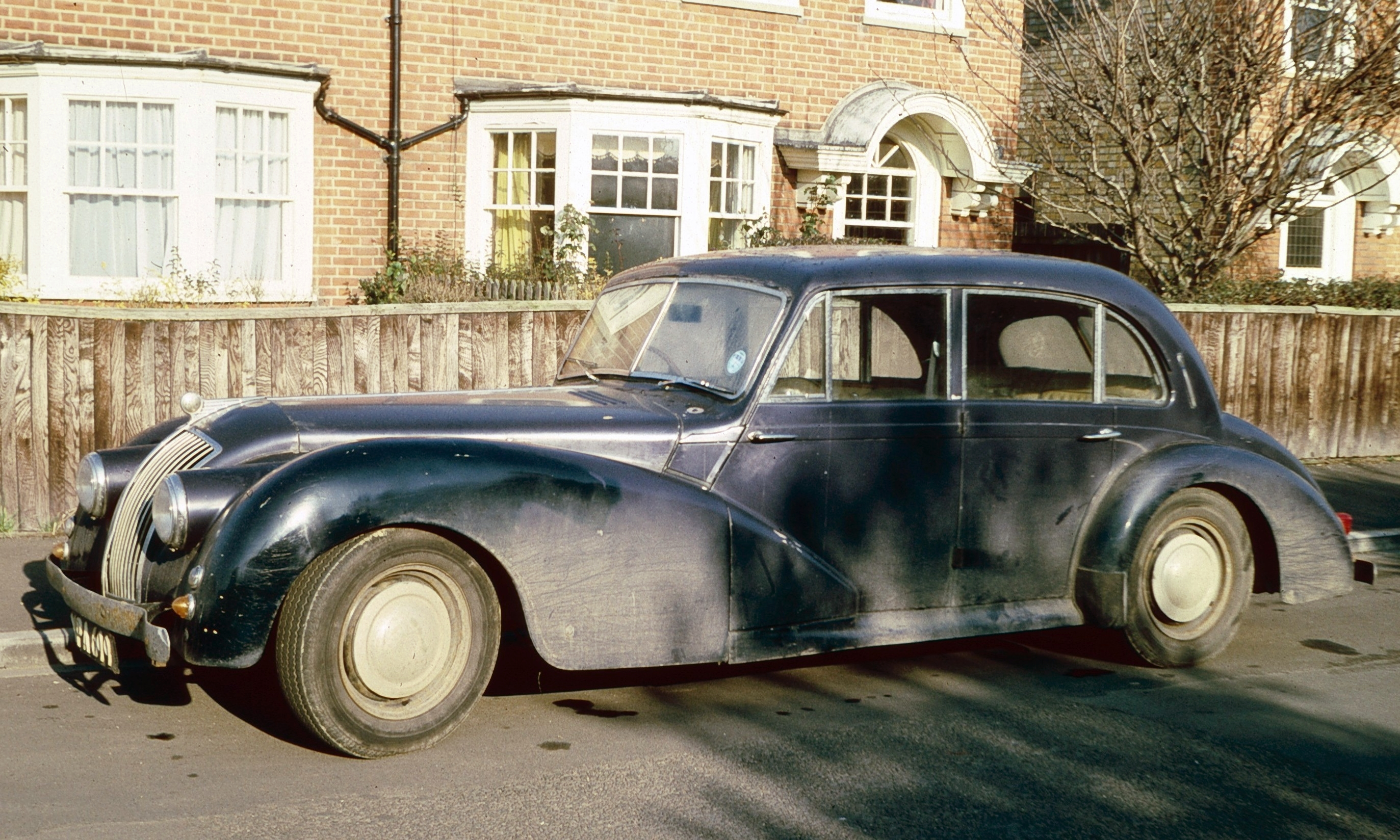
A.C. 2-Litre 1947–1956. The four-door configuration and the wider 6.75 × 16 inch wheels identify this as a later example. The flashing indicators will have been retro-fitted.

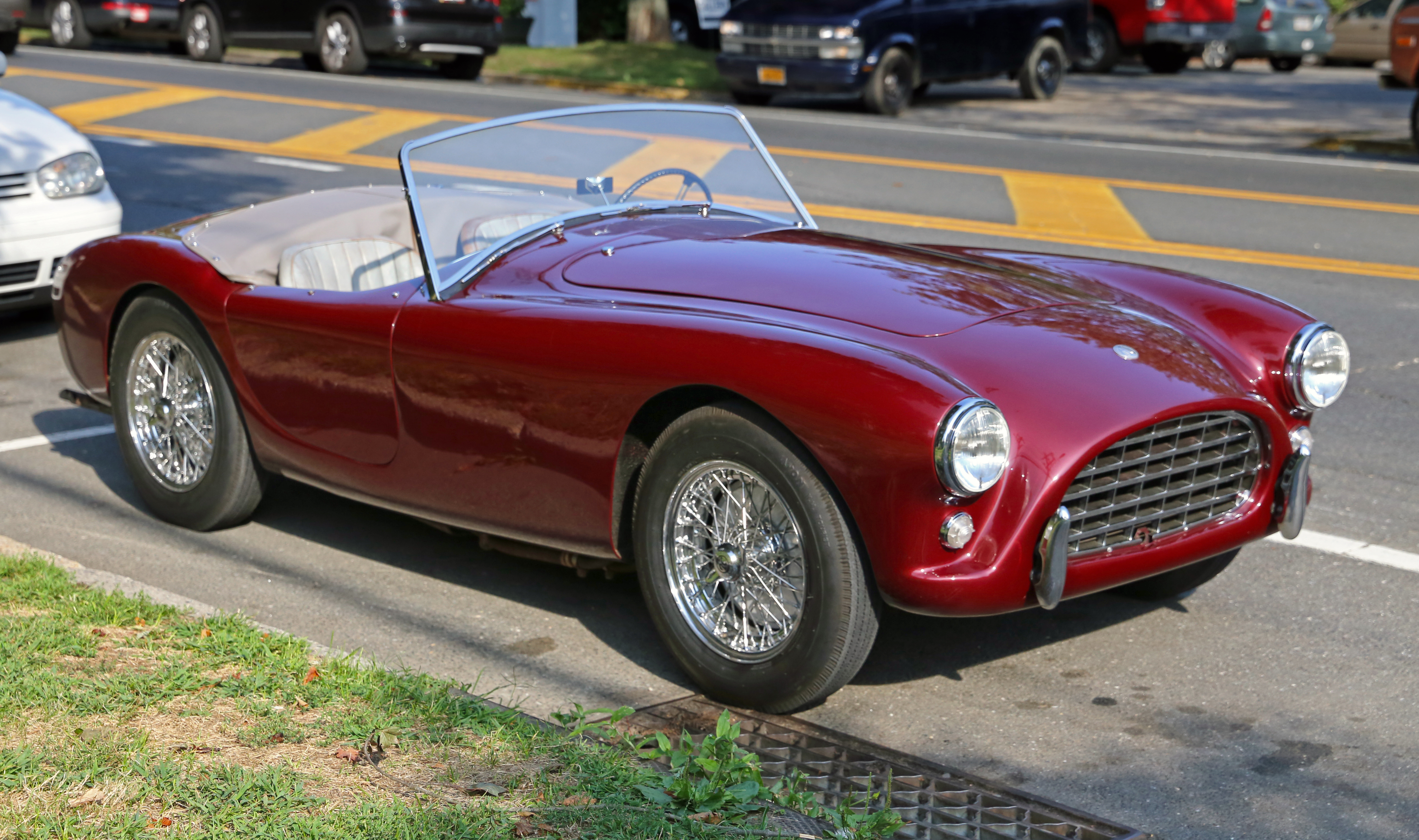
1958 AC Ace, AC engined

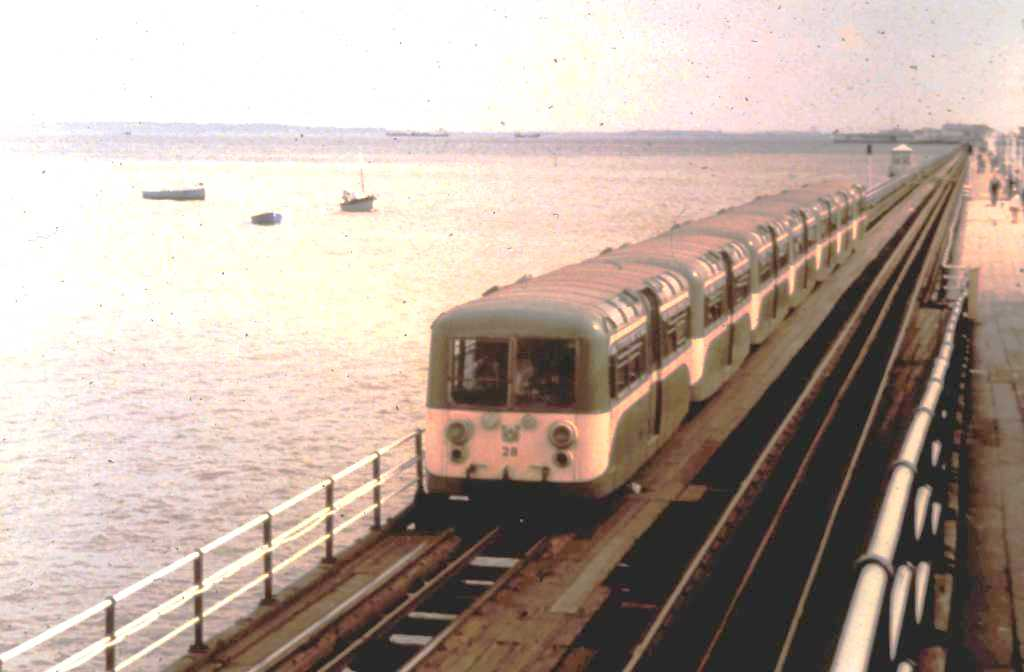
One of the four Southend Pier Railway cars, built by AC-Cars in 1949

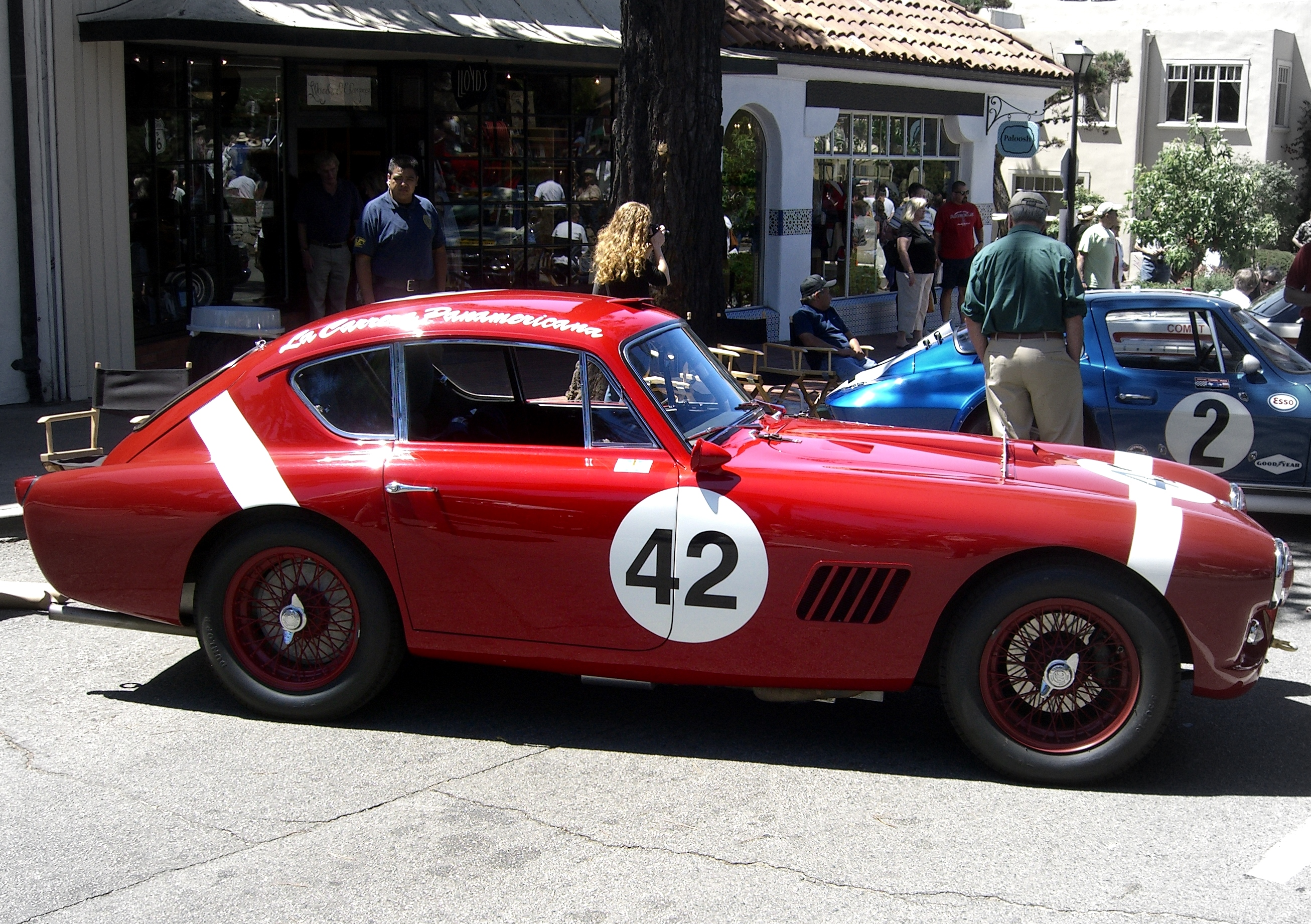
1957 AC Aceca Bristol prepared for the "Carrera Panamericana" revival Mexican road race

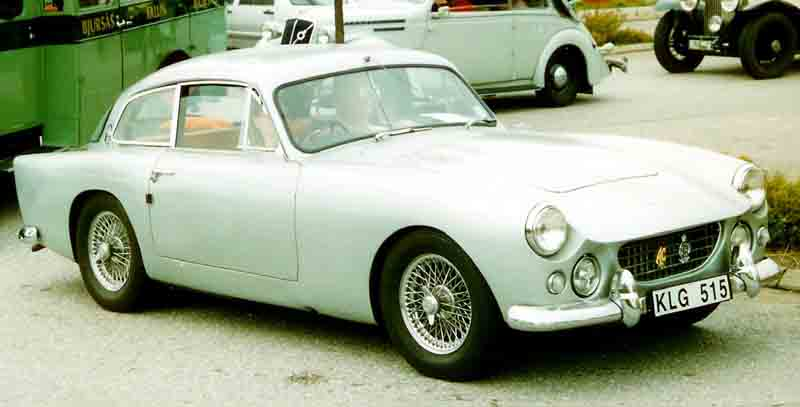
A.C. Greyhound Saloon 1962

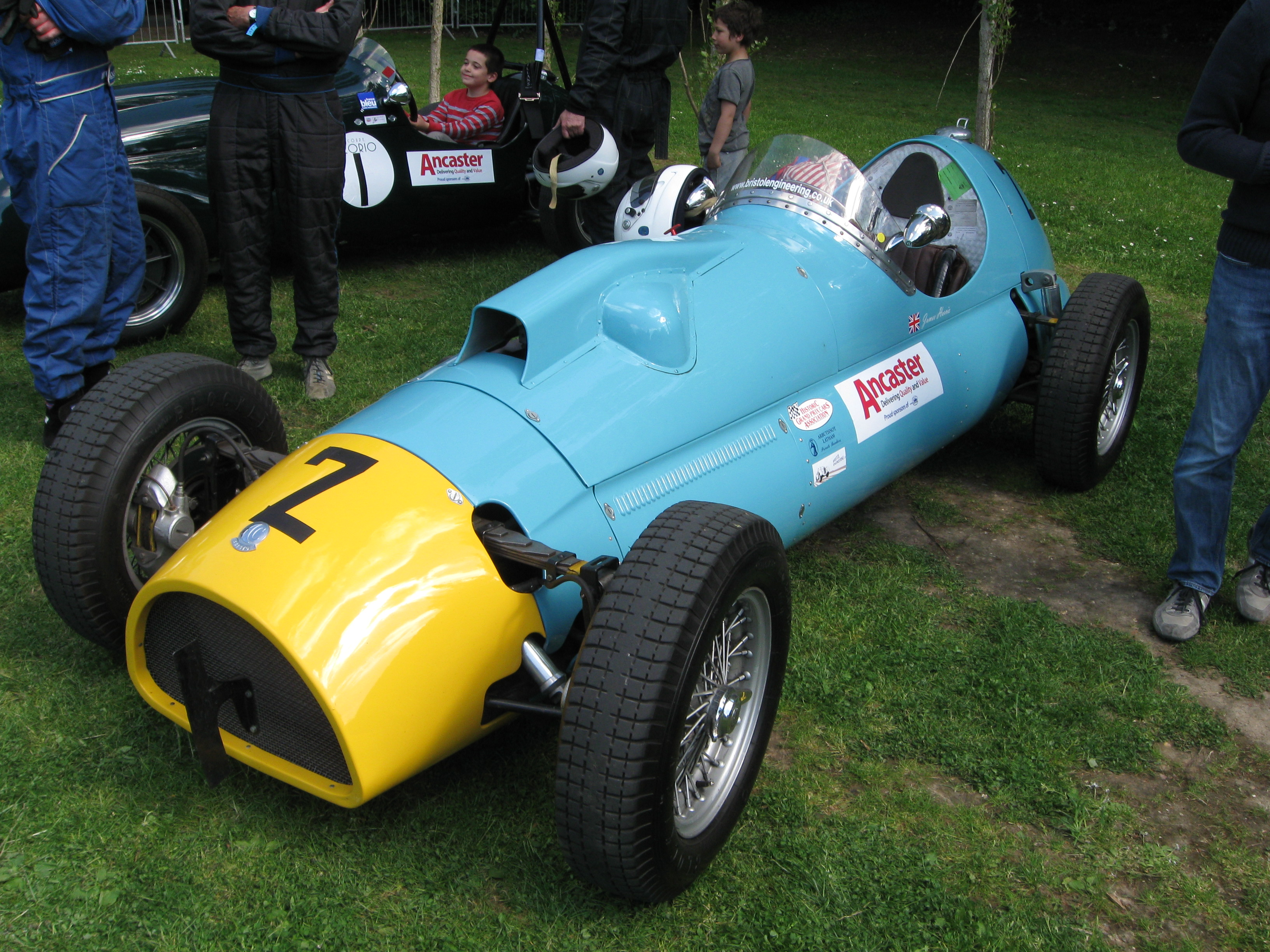
1959 AC single-seater at Motor Sport at the Palace, Crystal Palace (circuit) 27 May 2013

After the war, AC secured a large contract with the government to produce the fibreglass-bodied, single seat, Thundersley Invacar Type 57 invalid carriages with Villiers 2-stroke engines. The invalid carriages continued to be built until 1976 and were an important source of revenue for the company. Production restarted in 1947 with the 2-Litre, using the 1991 cc engine from the 16. The 2-Litre used an updated version of the pre-war, underslung chassis, fitted with the AC straight-six engine and traditional ash-framed and aluminium-panelled coachwork, available in saloon or convertible versions. They also built an aluminium-bodied three-wheeled microcar, the Petite, as well as "Bag Boy" golf carts (with independent suspension to the two wheels).

In 1953, the firm began production of the AC Ace, based on a lightweight chassis designed by John Tojeiro and hand built aluminium body designed and built by Eric George Gray with the venerable Weller-designed 2-Litre engine.

For 1954, a new aluminium-bodied closed coupe was unveiled at Earls Court, the AC Aceca, pronounced A-seek-a. It was only slightly heavier than the convertible Ace, and because of better aerodynamics was also slightly faster (128 mph (206 km/h) top speed).

There was a demand from some customers for a larger four-seater car, for whom AC produced the Greyhound. This was built on a stretched Ace chassis with coil suspension all around and a 2.2-litre Bristol engine.

In September 1961, AC was approached by Carroll Shelby to use a small block Ford Windsor V8 engine in the Ace chassis, producing the AC Cobra. Shelby needed a car that could compete with the Chevrolet Corvette in US sports car racing. Only a single example was built (CSX 2000) using a Ford 221 Windsor V8. It debuted in 1962 with a Ford 260 V8 engine. This was then superseded by the Ford 289 V8 engine.

=== 1964 Le Mans ===
In 1964 the company decided that in addition to supplying Shelby's chassis orders they would enter a works Cobra (which had the chassis number A98) in that year's Le Mans 24 Hours race. They contracted Jack Sears to be one of the drivers. To test its stability and gearing at the speeds the car was expected to reach in the race's three mile Mulsanne Straight they decided to test it beforehand along the only available place that was long enough to reach its potential top speed. This was the northern end of the first section of the six lane M1 motorway which had no barriered central reservation and no speed limit. The use of the motorway for high speed testing was not unusual as Aston Martin, Jaguar and the Rootes Group had also used it.

After Sears had some food at the Blue Boar service station and waited beside it for no traffic to pass for several minutes, he set off at about 4:15 am on 11 June 1964. In top gear the car reached 6,500 rpm on its rev-counter (it had no speedometer) until the needle moved no more. Sears then slowed down and returned to the engineers. From the engine revolutions and after compensating for tyre growth, they calculated that the car had reached 185mph.

Within days, after a conversation in a Fleet Street bar, reports of the high speed run made the headlines in national newspapers. This led to the Ministry of Transport investigating, but no action was taken as no laws had been broken.

Nine days after the M1 test, the car participated in the 1964 Le Mans race with Sears and Peter Bolton sharing the driving. While being driven in the evening by Bolton the car had a rear tyre blowout, spun and was then hit by the Ferrari of Giancarlo Baghetti. Tragically the Cobra barrelled, speared off into the barriers and killed three young French spectators who were standing in a prohibited area. Baghetti was uninjured but Bolton was taken to hospital with minor injuries.

The damaged Cobra was brought back from France and stored at the AC factory in Thames Ditton until in 1972 it came into the possession of collector Barrie Bird. Over many years he undertook a full rebuild, including fitting it with new body manufactured by Maurice Gomm, who had created the car's original body.

=== Development of a new chassis ===
At the end of the 1964 racing season, the Cobra was being outclassed in sports car racing by Ferrari. Carroll Shelby decided he needed a bigger engine. A big block Ford FE series 390 V8 was installed in a Cobra but it was over-powered and the car was now almost undrivable. It was decided that a completely new chassis was needed. With the combined help of Ford's computers and the experience of the AC engineers, the new MKIII was born with 4-inch (100 mm) main tubes instead of 3-inch (76 mm) ones for the chassis, adding huge cross-braced shock towers and coil springs all around. In 1965 a competition version with a stripped interior, no glove box, different instrument layout and revised suspension was introduced. The competition version also had a more powerful motor with only one carburettor, side exhausts, a roll bar and wider fenders to accommodate racing tires. The engine that was installed in the car was Ford's famed 427 FE NASCAR "Side-Oiler" V8, a power-house engine developing 425 bhp (317 kW) in its mildest street version.

The car missed homologation for the 1965 season and was not raced by the Shelby team. However, it was raced successfully by many privateers and went on to win races all the way into the 1970s. At the end of 1966, Shelby was left with 31 unsold competition cars; it was decided by Shelby American to sell them to the general public under the name of Cobra 427 S/C or Semi-Competition. These S/C cars have become the most sought after models and can sell in excess of 1.5 million dollars.

In 1966, a street model of the 427 S/C was made available. It came with a tamer motor, optional dual carburetors, a glove box, and exhaust running under the car. Meanwhile, AC went on producing a milder version of the 427 MK III Cobra for the European market fitted with the small block Ford motor. The car was called the AC 289 and 27 were produced. Carroll Shelby sold the Cobra name to Ford in 1965 and went on to help develop the famed racing Ford GT40.

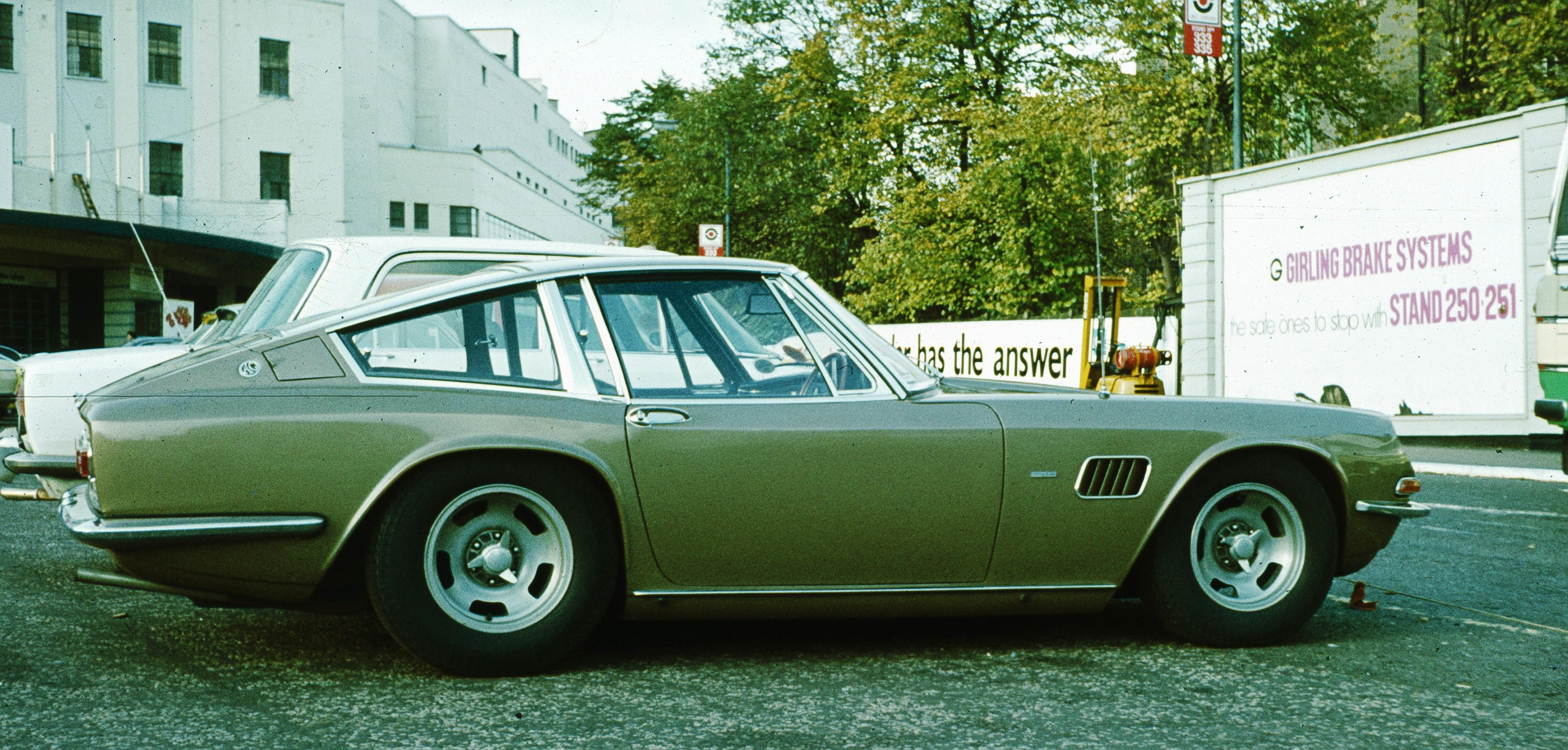
AC 428 Frua

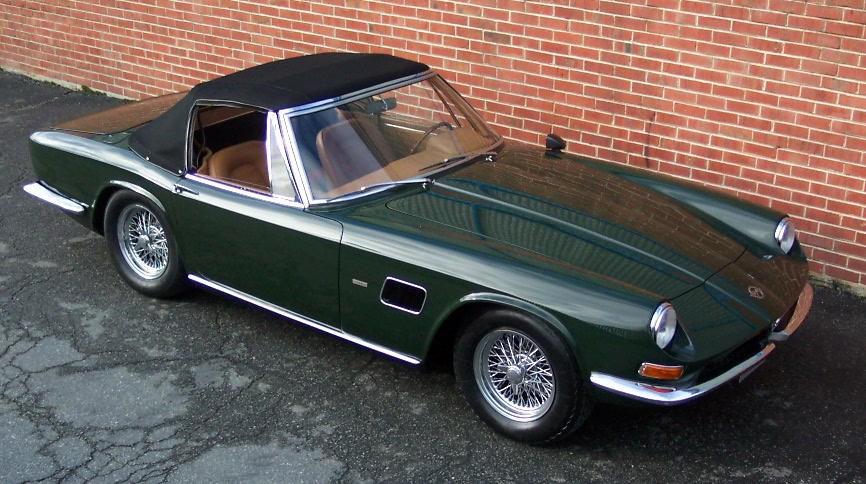
1971 AC 428

At the same time, the company realized they needed a grand tourer model that could appeal to wealthy customers. AC contacted the famed Italian coach builder Pietro Frua to design an appealing GT body that could be fitted on a MKIII Cobra chassis stretched by 6 inches (150 mm). The new car was shown at the 1965 Turin show. A few early models were fitted with the famed 427 Ford FE motors. In 1967 the long-stroked 428 motor became available and the car was known as the AC 428. Built out of steel rather than AC's usual aluminium, the Frua is heavier than a Cobra at slightly under 3,000 lb (1,400 kg). That said, it is still a light and very fast automobile built on a racing chassis. The car was never fully developed and the cost of sending chassis from England to Italy and back for final assembly made it so expensive that only a few were produced. Production ended in 1973 after only 80 cars (29 convertibles and 51 coupes) were finished.

In 1970, a special version of the coupé was built. It was based on an extended bodyshell that Frua built for Monteverdi which was supposed to become the second Monteverdi 375/L (Monteverdi chassis# 2002). After the alliance between Monteverdi and Frua broke apart in Summer 1969, that bodyshell remained in the Frua works in Turin. A year or so later Frua changed some details on front and rear, including some semi-hidden headlamps similar to those seen on the Iso Lele and the second series Iso Grifo before. The car was called AC 429; it remained a one-off.

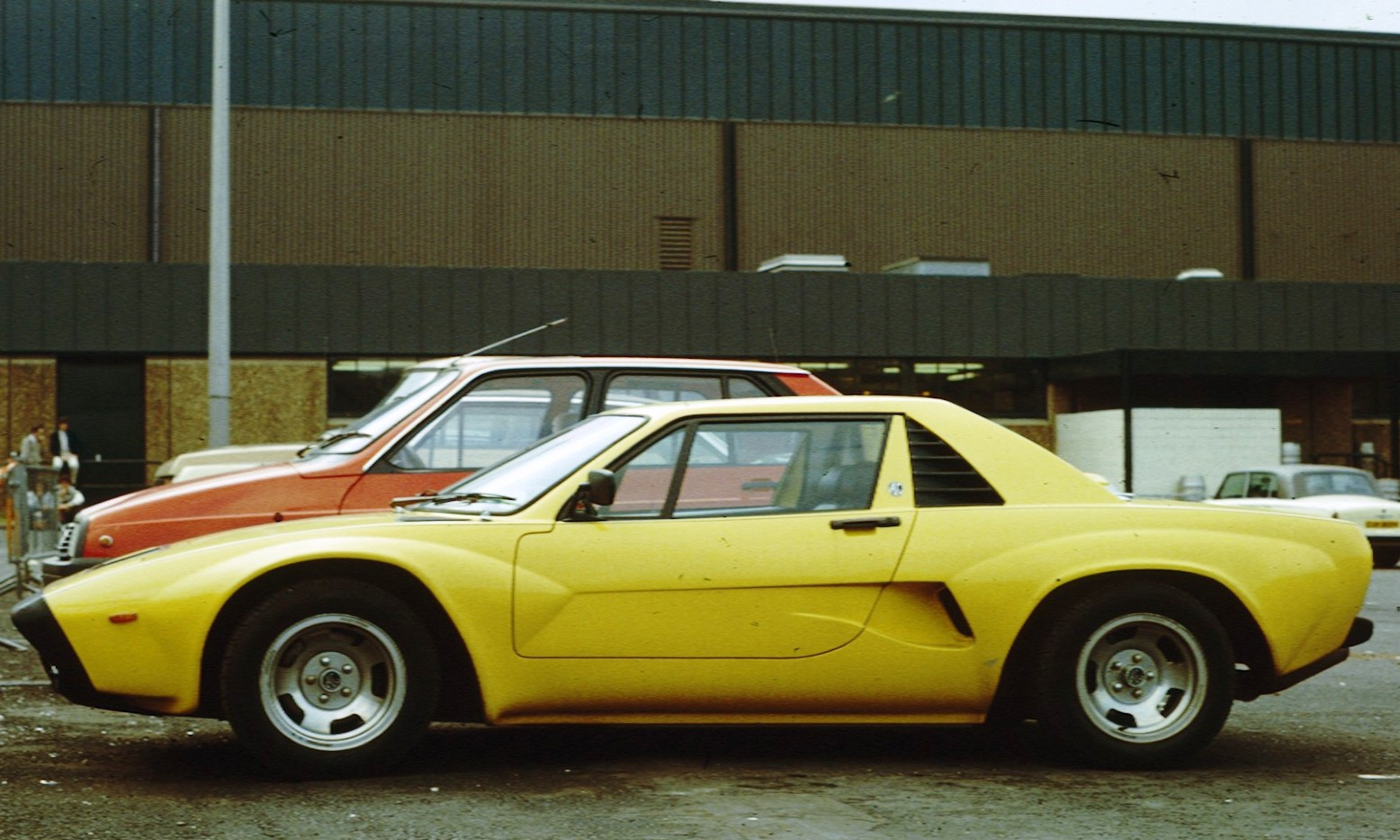
1979 AC 3000ME

The 1970s were not a good period for luxury car manufacturers and Derek Hurlock went searching for a totally new, smaller car. Mid-engined designs were in fashion at the time and in 1972 the Diablo, a prototype with an Austin Maxi engine and transaxle, was built by privateers Peter Bohanna and Robin Stables.

In much the same way as they had taken up the Tojeiro prototype and turned it into the Ace, AC acquired the rights and at the 1973 London Motor Show showed their own version, the mid-engined ME3000 with the 3.0-litre Ford Essex V6 engine installed transversely over a bespoke AC-designed gearbox. Development was virtually complete in 1976 when new Type Approval regulations were introduced. A prototype failed the 30 mph (48 km/h) crash test, and the chassis had to be redesigned. On the second attempt, the car passed with flying colours. This was a huge achievement for a tiny firm — Vauxhall had to make several attempts before the contemporary Chevette passed. For AC, such delays meant that the first production cars (later renamed 3000ME) were not delivered until 1979, by which time they were in direct competition with the Lotus Esprit. Although comfortable, brisk, nicely built and practical, the car's handling was heavily criticised by writers from Car Magazine, Autocar and Motor. AC's ambitions of selling 250 cars per year were a distant memory. After just 71 cars were sold, Hurlock called a halt to production as his health was suffering and the company was struggling in the teeth of a recession. In 1984, production stopped at Thames Ditton and the car and the AC name were licensed to a new company registered as AC (Scotland) plc run by David McDonald in a new factory in Hillington, Glasgow. Here, 30 cars were built, including a development car tested with Alfa Romeo's 2.5-litre V6 engine and a nearly complete Mark 2 prototype of the same. Regardless (or possibly because) of these developments, AC Scotland called in the receivers in 1985.

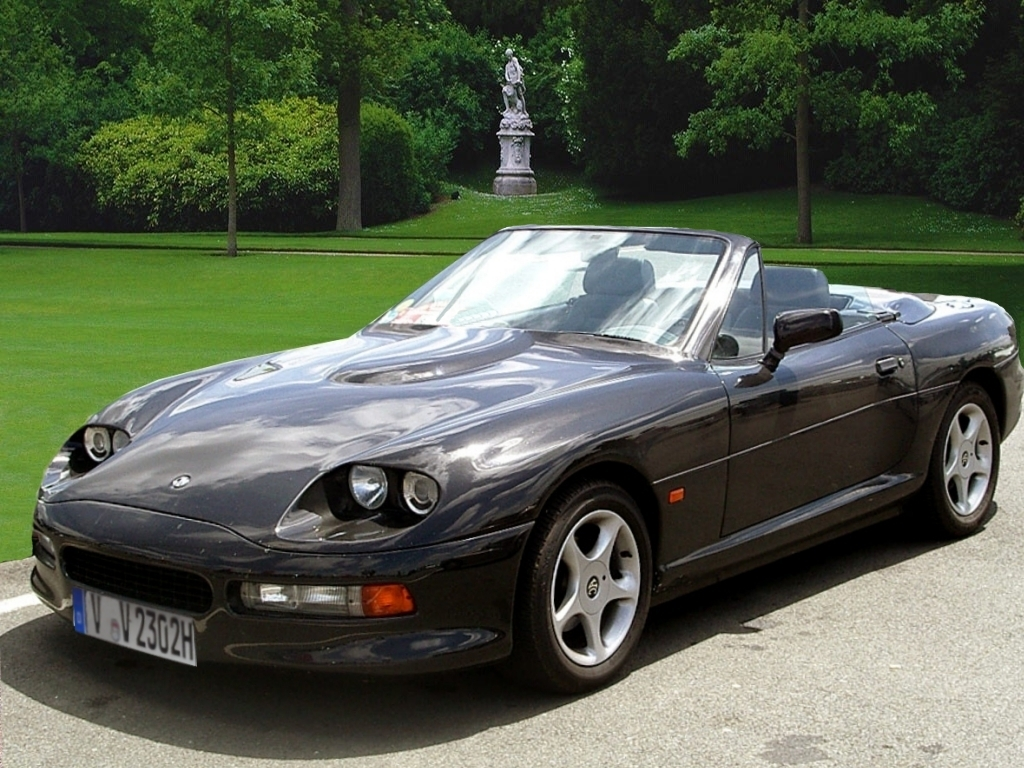
AC Brooklands Ace

=== Dissolution of the company ===
After selling the historic High Street works for redevelopment, AC themselves soldiered on as a service operation in the "21st Century" works on Summer Road until the Hurlock family finally sold their holdings in 1986 to William West.

After some complex machinations, the company was split between property interests and the car brand; the former was renamed and the latter was acquired by C.P.Autokraft's owner, Brian Angliss.

=== Autokraft name acquisition ===
In 1982, Brian Angliss was running Autokraft, a Cobra restoration shop, parts supplier and replica manufacturer. To further such pursuits, he acquired some of the tooling from Thames Ditton and created the MKIV; the car had US-spec 5 mph (8.0 km/h) bumpers, a US-regulations compliant motor, and a larger interior with modern switchgear. About 480 cars were produced in his factory at Brooklands. He also produced a lightweight model which was more in tune with the original Cobra spirit, though it could not be exported to the US owing to federal regulations.

Early cars were sold as the Autokraft MKIV, but eventually Angliss acquired the rights to use the AC name. Derek Hurlock had been strongly protective of the name, but Angliss' high standards of craftsmanship won him over. When the Hurlock family finally sold up in 1986 Angliss fully acquired the AC trademark rights and set up a new AC company as a joint venture with Ford, who had also recently bought Aston Martin. A big conflict followed over the future direction for AC, but Angliss eventually won his independence as well as Ford's continuing and essential cooperation as an engine and parts supplier.

Also interested in aircraft, Angliss restored a Hawker Hurricane XIIB at Brooklands as well as acquiring two ex–Indian Air Force Hawker Tempest IIs as future projects. The Hurricane was registered as G-HURR and was destroyed in a fatal accident at the Shoreham air show in 2007.

Angliss looked for a new car to complement and perhaps replace the MKIV. At the 1993 London Motor Show, he introduced a new vehicle that he named the AC Ace. It was a modern automobile with a stainless steel chassis and an aluminium body, but was expensive to develop and build. The costs hit Angliss hard and he sold his large motor bike collection, vintage Bentley and other assets to try to make ends meet. The receivers were called in by 1996 after approximately 50 "new" Aces had been built.

=== AC Car Group Ltd. ===
In March 1996, largely due to the cost of developing the new Ace, Angliss' company went into receivership and was eventually sold to South African businessman Alan Lubinsky in December 1996, who continued car production in Weybridge, Surrey, under the name of AC Car Group Ltd.

Both the Cobra Mk IV and the Ace were made, and soon a 'CRS' version of the Mk IV was announced with a carbon fibre body shell, a 212 S/C version with Lotus twin-turbo V8 power, as well as the AC Superblower with a supercharger Ford V8. Two Aceca coupes (enclosed version of the Ace) were also made.

=== AC Motor Holdings Ltd. ===
In August 2002, AC Motor Holdings Ltd. was incorporated in Malta.

In 2003, Carroll Shelby International and AC Motor Holdings Ltd. announced the production of an authentic Shelby/AC Cobra, with the production vehicle arriving at dealers in July 2004. Initial models included Shelby AC 427 S/C Cobra and Shelby AC 289 FIA Cobra, which were branded as the CSX 1000 and CSX 7500 Series, respectively. In February 2004, the first handcrafted aluminium body shell was built at Frimley works.

In 2004, a new manufacturing plant was opened in Malta and production of the carbon-fibre-bodied AC MkV began. Due to problems with the factory building, production ceased in 2007.

=== Acedes Holdings LLC ===
In August 2008, Acedes Holdings LLC was incorporated in St Kitts.

In 2008, AC announced a joint venture with Brooklands Motor Company (the spiritual successor of Autokraft) in Weybridge, Surrey, and confirmed plans for the continuation of the traditional AC designed tubular chassis and aluminium-bodied models.

In April 2009, a joint venture in Germany was announced to manufacture the new AC MKVI.

=== AC Automotive ===
AC Automotive, based in Straubenhardt, Germany, built AC cars under the original name from 2010 to mid-2023. Cars were sold in Germany, France and England, with sales in Luxembourg, Holland, Lichtenstein, Switzerland, and Belgium slated for the future. Pricing for the standard ACGT model starts at £104,400 before options. The AC Automotive company went into liquidation on 24 July 2023.

Following a supply deal with GM, the AC MKVI had a novel spaceframe chassis, 6.2-litre V8 engine and 6-speed manual transmission, and new Corvette brakes, retaining the original shape in lightweight composite material with the moulds taken from an original AC MKIII body. The car went into series production in July 2012 after two years of intense prototyping and development.

In 2010, AC announced a joint venture with the USA-based company Iconic which resulted in the design of the ultimate "Cobra": the "Iconic AC Roadster".

At the Geneva Motor Show in 2012, AC Cars showed three different models: the AC MK VI, AC MK II Classic, and AC 378 GT Zagato.

In 2020, AC Cars announced that they would be building a zero-emission version of the Cobra called the Series 1 Electric. Fifty-eight of these electric sports cars will be built alongside a 2.3-litre petrol version called the AC Cobra 140 Charter Edition.

In 2022, the new corporate structure began the production of 663 new AC Cobra models, with a slightly modified structure to adapt it to modern safety and technology requirements and obtain the European road homologation certificate.

== Car models ==
Type	Engine	Approx production	Year	Notes
Autocarrier	648 cc single-cylinder air-cooled	About 1500	1904–1914	Three-wheeler goods carrier with single wheel at rear and driver behind the load. Chain drive to rear wheel via two-speed epicyclic gearbox.
AC Sociable	648 cc single-cylinder air-cooled	Possibly 1800	1907–1914	Passenger version of the Auto Carrier from 1907 with driver and passenger side by side (2-seater) or driver behind (3-seater).
AC Ten	1096 cc four-cylinder water-cooled	About 100	1913–1916	Engine made by Fivet of France. Transmission by Transaxle (combined rear axle and gearbox). Two-seater and dickey or Sports two-seater. Optional 1327 cc engine pre war, standard post war.
AC 12 hp	1478/1992 cc four-cylinder water-cooled	Approx 850 including six-cylinder models to 1929	1920–1927	Engine made by Anzani or later Cubitt in Aylesbury. Transmission by three-speed transaxle. Two- or four-seater bodies.
AC Six (16/40, 16/56 and 16/66)	1478/1991 cc six-cylinder water-cooled	Approx 850 including 12 hp models to 1929 plus 50 assembled from parts 1930–33.	1920–1929	Engine made by A.C. Larger capacity from 1922. 16/66 had triple SU carburetors. Transmission by 3-speed transaxle. Two- or four-seater bodies.
AC Six (16/60, 16/70, 16/80 and 16/90)	1991 cc six-cylinder water-cooled	618 1932 to 1940	1932–1940	Engine made by AC; 16/90 was supercharged with an Arnott blower. Transmission by four-speed ENV, Moss synchromesh or Wilson pre-selector gearbox. Longer and wider than previous Six. Chassis overslung 1932–33, underslung 1933–1939, overslung 1939–1940.

=== After the Second World War ===
Type	Engine	Approx production	Year	Notes
AC 2-Litre	1991 cc six-cylinder water-cooled	1284	1947–1958	Engine made by A.C. Two- and four-door saloons, drophead coupé and tourer bodies.
AC All Weather (Invalid)			1950–1953	Villiers engine.
AC Petite	350 cc single-cylinder two-stroke	Approx 4000	1952–1958	Villiers engine. Four-speed gearbox. Three-wheeler with single front wheel. Two/three-seater.
AC Ace	1991/1971 cc six-cylinder water-cooled	689	1953–1963	Engine made by AC; or Bristol (1971 cc) from 1956; or Ford Zephyr (2553 cc) from 1961. Two-seat aluminium open sports bodies.
AC Aceca	1991/1971/2553 cc six-cylinder water-cooled	357	1954–1963	Engine made by AC; or Bristol (1971 cc) from 1956; or Ford Zephyr (2553 cc) from 1961. Front disc brakes from 1957. Two-seat aluminium sports coupé bodies with hatchback.
AC Acedes (Invalid)	Villiers Mk 11E engine.		1957–1967	MK 1-12
AC Greyhound	1971/2216/2553 cc six-cylinder water-cooled	83	1959–1963	Engine from Bristol. De Dion rear suspension, (Some might have the AC Independent suspension). 2 plus 2 coupe bodies.
AC Cobra 260/289	4261/4727 cc V8	75/571	1962–1965	Legendary two-seat aluminium roadster. Ford small block V8 Engine. Four-wheel disk brakes. Early MK1 cars had cam and peg steering, later MK2 cars rack and pinion.
AC Cobra 427/428	6997/7016 cc V8	306	1965-1966	MK3 series. A reworked AC Cobra designed for racing with coil springs all around and beefed up 4" chassis tubes. Early cars had Ford FE 427 Engines, later cars fitted with less expensive 428 FE motors. Around 400 bhp (298 kW) or more depending on version, four-wheel disc brakes and rack and pinion steering. Aluminium-bodied two-seat roadster bodies.
AC 289 Sports	4727 cc V8	27	1965–1968	AC 289 Sports had AC 427 MK3 coil spring chassis & body with narrow fenders.
AC 428	6997/7016 cc V8	81	1965–1973	Frua body built on a six-inch (150 mm) stretched Cobra 427 Chassis Ford FE 428 400 bhp (298 kW) engine. four-wheel disc brakes. Manual or automatic transmission. Two-seat open or coupé, steel body built in Italy.
AC Acedes (Invalid)	Villiers Mk 11E engine.	5,928	1967–1971	MK 14-15 (Fiberglass body)
AC Model 70 (Invalid)	493cc Steyr-Puch flat-twin		1971–1978	Produced jointly by both AC Cars Ltd & Invacar Ltd. (AC Cars designed)
AC 3000ME	2994 cc V6 Ford 'Essex'	101 full production cars	1979–1985	Transverse mid-engined with five-speed AC gearbox. Platform chassis with front and rear subframes, GRP body.

=== AC Autokraft models ===
Type	Engine	Approx production	Year	Notes
AC MK IV	V8	1982–1996	Engine made by Ford.	
AC MK III S/C	V8	~17 Cars	1992–1996	Series CSX 3000, CSX 4000, COB 4000, COX 6100
AC Brooklands Ace	4601/4942 cc V8	~58 Cars	1993–1996	Engine made by Ford. 4942 cc version supercharged.

=== AC Car Group models ===
Type	Engine	Approx production	Year	Notes
AC Ace V8	4601/4942 cc V8	1997–2000	Engine made by Ford. 4942 cc version supercharged. Chassis made in South Africa, bodies in Coventry.	
AC Aceca	4601/4942 cc V8	2 Cars	1998–2001	Engine made by Ford. 4942 cc version supercharged. Four-seat coupé version of the Ace. Chassis made in South Africa, bodies in Coventry.
AC MK III FIA	V8	1 Car	1998	1 race model made for Brooklands Motor Company, (COB 4007). Car produced at Brooklands.
AC MK II FIA	V8	1 Car	1999	Only 1 of the planned 25 cars were built. Chassis number COB 1001. Aluminium Body and Chassis produced at Brooklands. Painted Viking Blue with Red team stripe in 2001.
AC Superblower (MK IV)	V8	1999–2002	Cars produced in Brooklands.	
AC CRS (MK IV)	V8	2000–2002	Cars produced in Brooklands.	
AC 212 S/C	3506 cc V8 Twin Turbo Lotus Engine	2 cars	2000	Car produced in Brooklands, Surrey.
AC Mamba Coupe	V8	1 Car	2000	Car produced in Brooklands, fiberglass coupe.
AC Centenary FIA	V8	1 Chassis	2001	Chassis produced in Brooklands, (AC 100 Series). This chassis was produced for the 100th Anniversary of AC Cars. A planned run of only 10 cars. The chassis used a CRS chassis (with 4in main tubes and a double roll bar) with leaf spring suspension from a MK II FIA.
AC MK III	V8	12 Cars	2002–2002	Cars made in Frimley works, (COB 5000 Series).

=== Superformance export models ===
Type	Engine	Approx production	Year	Notes
AC MK II	V8	1 FIA, 1 289	2002–2003	Cars made in Frimley works, (COX 2610, COX 2615)
AC MK III	V8	1 Car	2002–2003	Car made in Frimley works, (COX 3361).
AC MK II Ace 2.6	V6	2 Cars	2002–2003	Car made in Frimley works, (RS 5027, RS 5028).

=== AC Motor Holdings models ===
Type	Engine	Approx production	Year	Notes
AC CRS (MK V)	V8	5 Cars	2002–2007	Engine made by Ford. Car made in Malta.
Shelby/AC 427 Cobra	V8	14 Cars	2003–2007	Engine made by Ford. Car made at Frimley works. (CSX 1001–1014)
Shelby/AC FIA Cobra	V8	2 Cars	2003–2007	Engine made by Ford. Car made at Frimley works. (CSX 7501, CSX 7503)

=== ACEDES Holdings models ===
Type	Engine	Approx production	Year	Notes
AC MK VI	6.2 V8	2009–	Corvette sourced engine. Car assembled by Gullwing in Germany (eventually by Hi-Tech Automotive in South Africa)	
AC MK II Classic	5016cc V8	3 cars	2012–	Ford sourced engine. Chassis made by Hi-Tech Automotive in South Africa. Composite bodies by Hi-Tech, alloy bodies by Brooklands Motor Company in UK. LHD (COX) cars assembled and shipped from Hi-Tech, RHD (COB) cars partially assembled by Hi-Tech and completed by Brooklands Motor Company in UK.
AC 378 GT Zagato	6.2 V8	2012–	First shown as Perana Z-One in 2009. Car built in South Africa by Hi-Tech Automotive.	

== Trains and railbuses ==
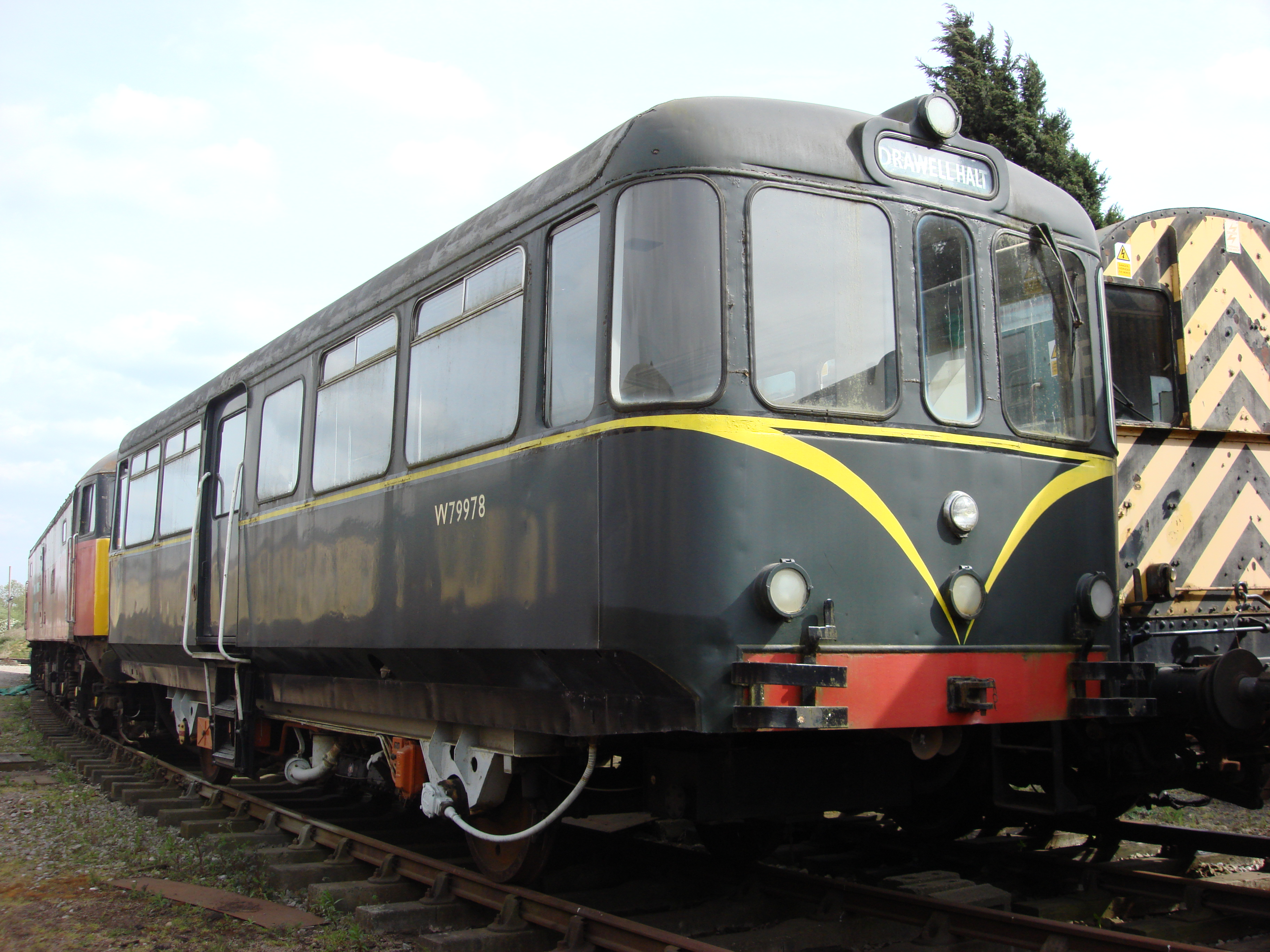
AC Cars railbus W79978 at the Colne Valley Railway

In 1949, AC Cars produced four trains, each consisting three power cars and four coaches, for the Southend Pier Railway in Essex. These remained in use until 1976. The company also ventured briefly into the railway rolling stock business, building five four-wheel railbuses for British Rail in 1958.

== See also ==
- British motor industry
- List of car manufacturers of the United Kingdom
