= AC Cobra =

Sports car

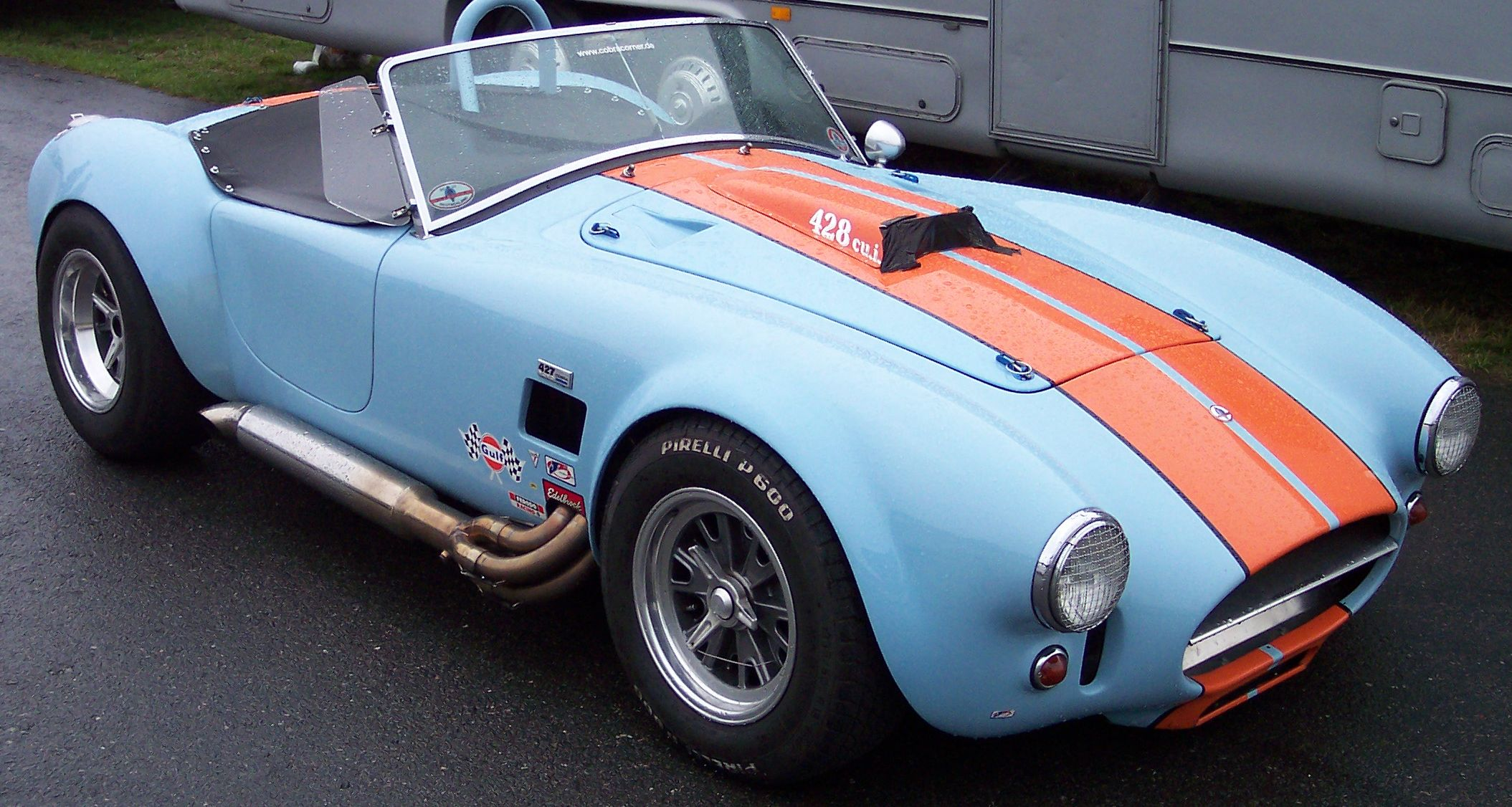
- AC Cobra MkIII

Overview
- Manufacturer: AC Cars; Shelby American
- Also called: AC Shelby Cobra; Shelby AC Cobra; Shelby Cobra; AC 289 Sports
- Production: 1962–1967; Leaf-spring: 655; Coil-spring: 343
- Assembly: Thames Ditton, Surrey, England, UK (AC Cars (EU) Ltd.); Los Angeles, California, U.S. (Shelby American, Inc.)

Body and chassis
- Class: Sports car (S)
- Body style: 2-door roadster
- Layout: FR layout
- Related: AC 428; Shelby Daytona

Chronology
- Predecessor: AC Ace
- Successor: AC MK IV

MkI
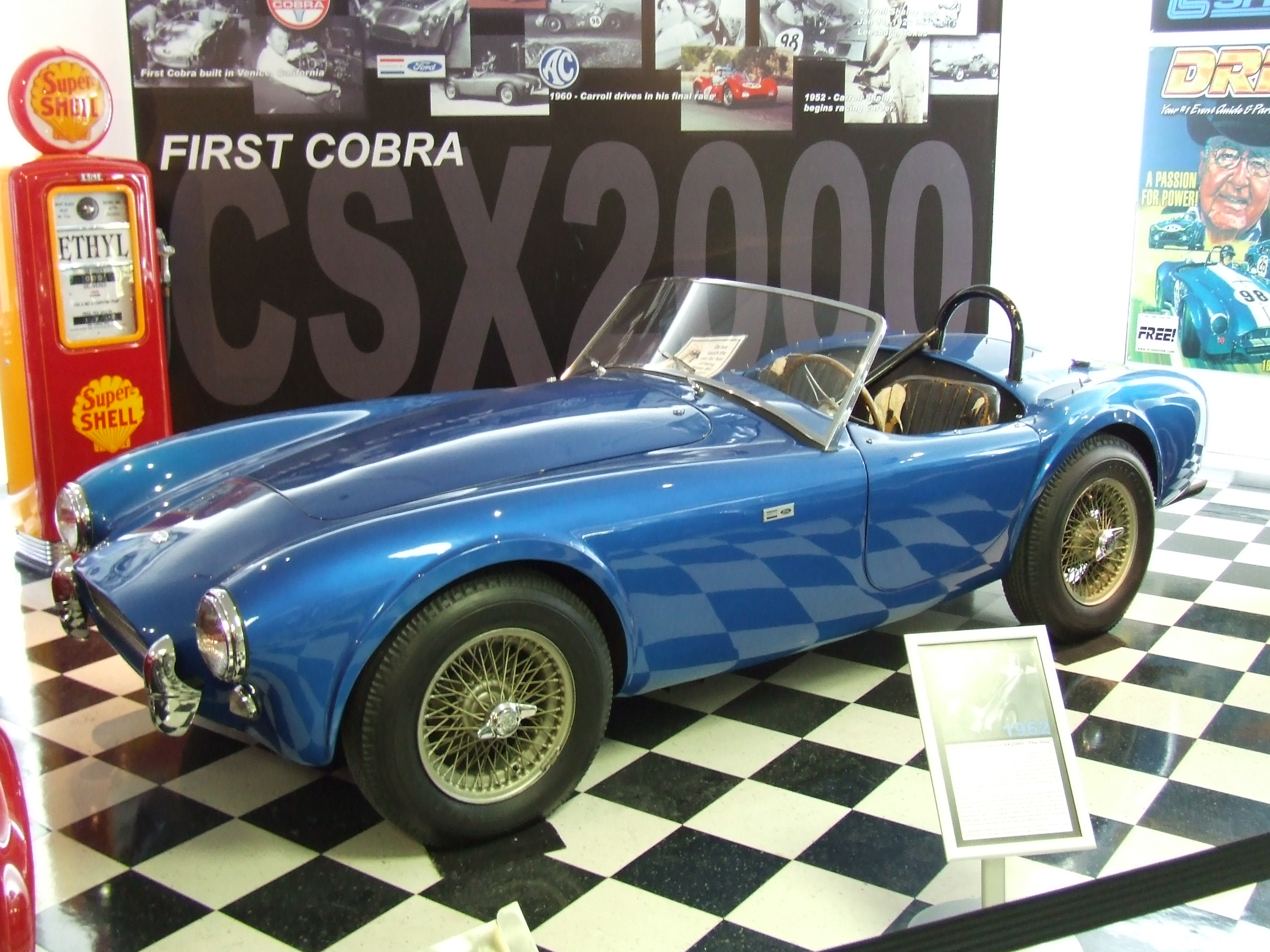
- CSX2000 – The first Cobra completed by Shelby

Overview
- Production: 1962–1963

Powertrain
- Engine: 4.3 or 4.7 L (260 or 289 cu in) V8

Dimensions
- Wheelbase: 2,286 mm (90 in)
- Length: 3,848 mm (151.5 in)
- Width: 1,549 mm (61 in)
- Height: 1,245 mm (49 in)
- Curb weight: 916 kg (2,019 lb)

MkII
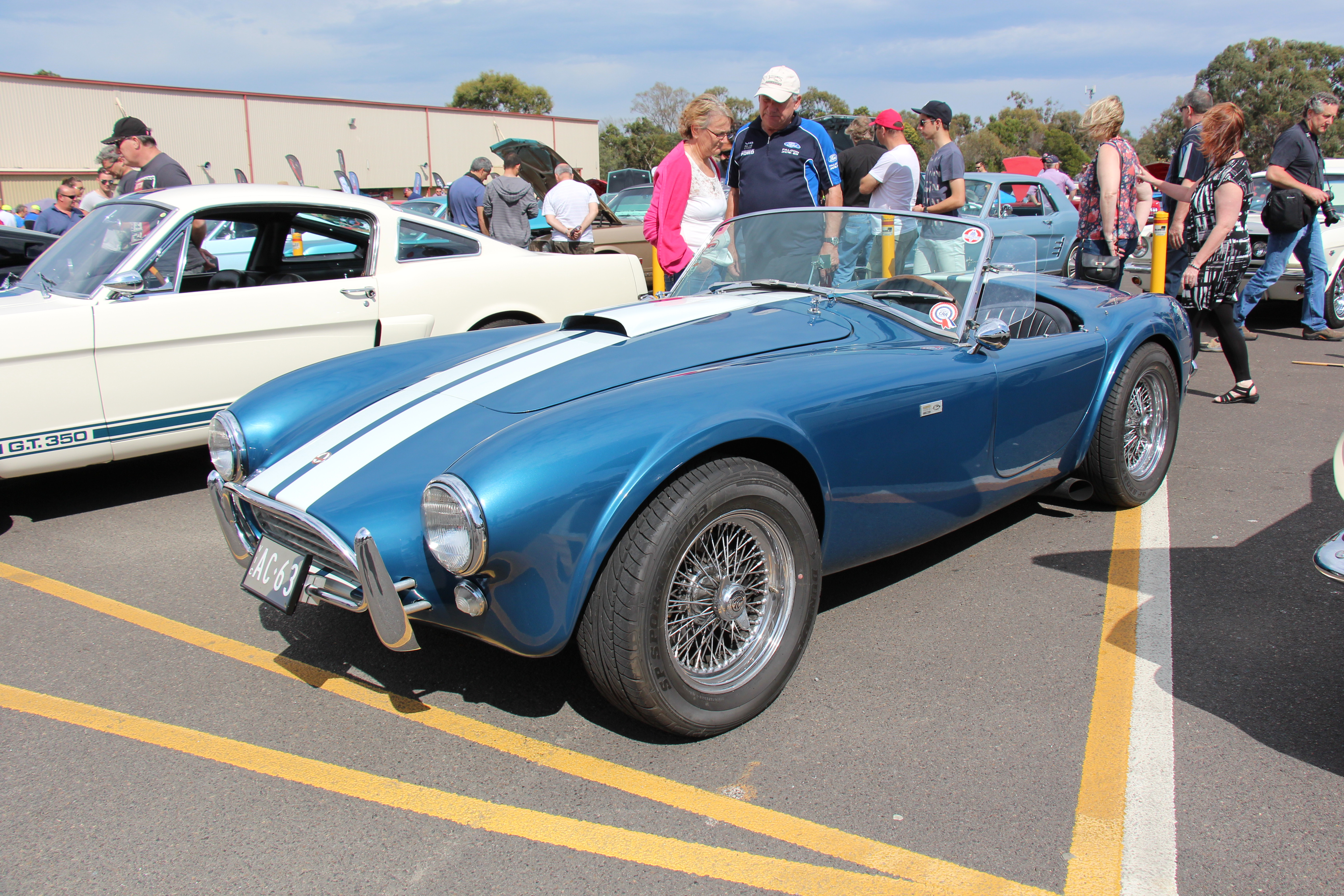
- 1963 Cobra MkII 289

Overview
- Production: 1963–1965

Powertrain
- Engine: 4.7 L (289 cu in) V8

Dimensions
- Wheelbase: 2,286 mm (90 in)
- Length: 3,848 mm (151.5 in)
- Width: 1,549 mm (61 in)
- Height: 1,245 mm (49 in)
- Curb weight: 1,050 kg (2,315 lb)

MkIII
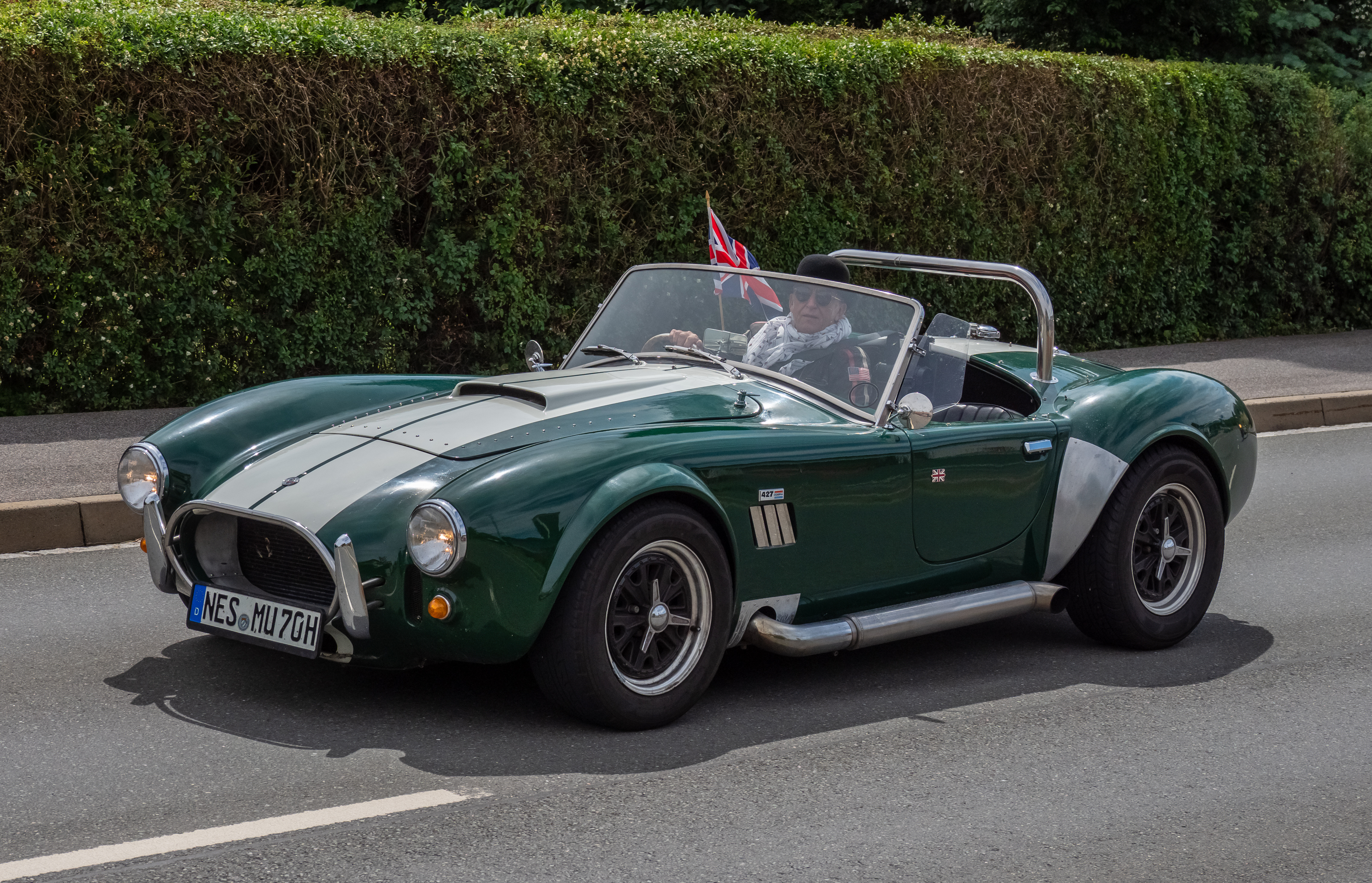
- AC Cobra 427

Overview
- Production: 1965–1967

Powertrain
- Engine: 7.0 or 4.7 L (427 or 289 cu in) V8

Dimensions
- Wheelbase: 2,286 mm (90 in)
- Length: 3,962 mm (156 in)
- Width: 1,727 mm (68 in)
- Height: 1,219 mm (48 in)
- Curb weight: 1,068 kg (2,355 lb)

The AC Cobra, sold in the United States as the Shelby Cobra and Shelby AC Cobra, is a sports car manufactured by British company AC Cars, with a Ford V8 engine. It was produced intermittently in both the United Kingdom and later the United States from 1962 to 1967.

== History and development ==
AC Cars had been building small numbers of its AC Ace two-seater roadster since 1953. The Ace had a steel ladder chassis with 3-inch (76 mm) diameter tubular main rails, and a hand-built body of aluminium panels shaped using English wheeling machines. The Ace had used three different straight-six engines over its production life, starting with AC's own Light Six, then Bristol Cars six derived from the pre-war BMW M328, and finally a 2.6 L (160 cu in) Ford Zephyr 6 engine. The Zephyr 6 was low enough that it allowed AC to restyle the nose of the car, lowering the hoodline, adding a smaller air intake, and removing the "moustache" lines below the headlamps on earlier cars.

In September 1961, Ford provided Shelby with two of its new 221 cu in (3.6 L) small block V8 engines, one of which was shipped to AC in England.

== AC Ace 3.6 ==
In January 1962 mechanics at AC Cars in Thames Ditton, Surrey completed the "AC Ace 3.6" prototype with chassis number CSX2000.

AC had already made most of the modifications needed for the small-block V8 when they installed the Ford Zephyr 6 engine, including the extensive rework of the AC Ace's front end bodywork. The only modification of the front end of the first Cobra from that of the "AC Ace 2.6" was the steering box, which had to be moved outward to clear the wider V8 engine.

A significant modification was the fitting of a stronger rear differential to handle the increased engine power. In the place of the old E.N.V. unit was a Salisbury 4HU differential with inboard disc brakes to reduce unsprung weight—the same unit used on the Jaguar E-Type.

After testing and modification, the engine and transmission were removed and the chassis was air-freighted to Shelby in Los Angeles on 2 February 1962.

By this time the small-block's displacement was increased to 4.3 L (260 cu in). Shelby's team installed the engine and a transmission into CSX2000 in less than eight hours at Dean Moon's shop in Santa Fe Springs, California, and began road-testing.

== Production ==
(CSX/CS 2001–2602)

A few changes were made to the production version:

- The inboard brakes were moved outboard to reduce cost.
- The fuel tank filler was relocated from the fender to the center of the trunk. The trunk lid had to be shortened to accommodate this change.

AC exported completed, painted, and trimmed cars (less engine and gearbox) to Shelby who then finished the cars in his workshop in Los Angeles by installing the engine and gearbox and correcting any bodywork flaws caused by the car's passage by sea. A small number of cars were also completed on the East Coast of the US by Ed Hugus in Pennsylvania, including the first production car; CSX2001.

The first 75 Cobra Mk1 models (including the prototype) were fitted with the 4.3 L (260 cu in) Windsor Ford V8. The remaining 51 Mk1 models were fitted with the larger 4.7-litre (289 cu in) version of the engine. After the 289 became available, Shelby offered an upgrade to the earlier cars. Most accepted the upgrade so cars with the 260 CID engine are rare today.

In late 1962, Alan Turner, AC's chief engineer, completed a major design change of the car's front end to accommodate rack and pinion steering while still using transverse leaf spring suspension (with the leaf spring doubling as the upper suspension link). The new car entered production in early 1963 and was designated Mark II. The steering rack was borrowed from the MGB while the new steering column came from the VW Beetle. About 528 Mark II Cobras were produced from 1963 to the summer of 1965. The last US-bound Mark II was produced in November 1964.

== European model ==
(COB/COX 6001–6062)

The Ace 2.6 was discontinued in 1963 to keep production focused on building cars for Shelby American Inc. To supply cars to the European market, AC began to market and sell the Cobra in Europe. Advertisements from the time state that the Cobra was designed to meet the requirements of Shelby American Inc.

== Chassis CSX2196 (the "Flip Top" Cobra) ==
Shelby experimented with a 390-cubic-inch (6.4 L) Ford FE engine in chassis CSX2196. The car did not receive the development it needed, as all available resources were committed to taking the crown from Ferrari in the GT class. Ken Miles raced the FE-powered Mark II at Sebring and pronounced the car virtually undrivable, naming it "The Turd". The car retired early with a failed engine.

However, the car was not just "virtually undriveable"; during the earlier practice session at Sebring, Ken had lost control of CSX2196 and crashed into a tree. After the disastrous race, with crash damage to repair and wild handling to improve, the car was completely stripped. Rebuilding the car from the bottom up, significant changes were made to the chassis and bodywork. The chassis was strengthened and stiffened to handle the greater power and torque of larger engines, using the same techniques as employed on the Shelby Daytona Coupe. The bodywork had to facilitate easier access to engine, drivetrain and suspension, so clamshells were installed front and rear, pivoting at the extremities and earning CSX2196 the nickname "Flip Top" Cobra. In addition to clamshells, the doors were hinged along the bottom and flipped down to open.

The revised CSX2196 raced in the showdown at Nassau, where a more relaxed division of racing classes allowed the Cobras to run against a prototype Ford GT40, GM Grand Sport Corvettes and a Lola Mk6. An aluminium 6.4-litre (390 cu in) engine was used. By the end of the first lap, the Cobra had a lead the length of the start-finish straight. However, the car failed to finish due to brake problems.

CSX2196 never raced again, remaining as a one-off development prototype, but it had proven a point - a big-block powered Cobra had huge potential, and the lessons learned facilitated production of the Cobra 427.

The car itself survives today, being driven occasionally at international prestige and enthusiast meetings.

== Cobra 427 ==
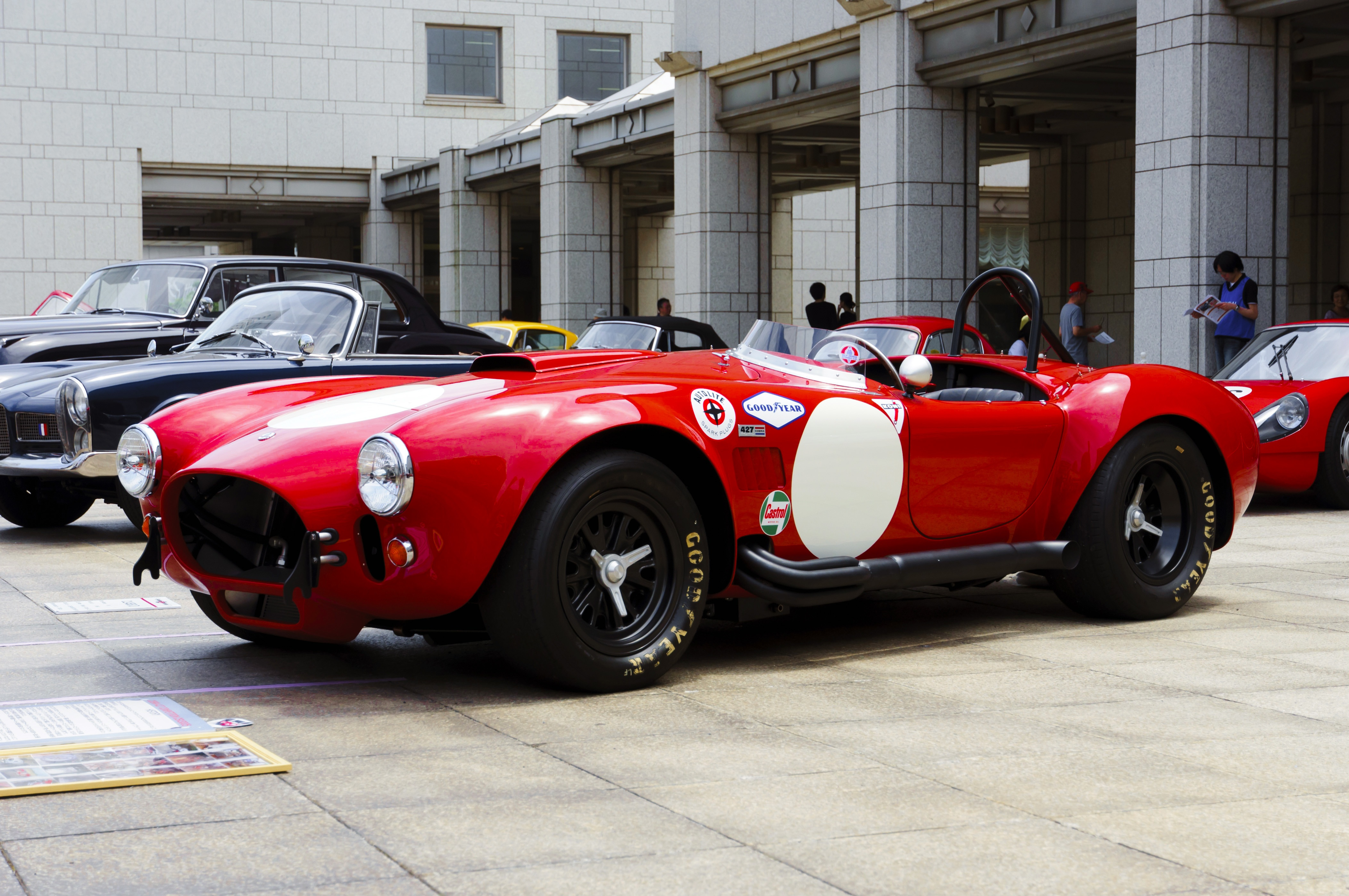
AC Cobra 427 Competition

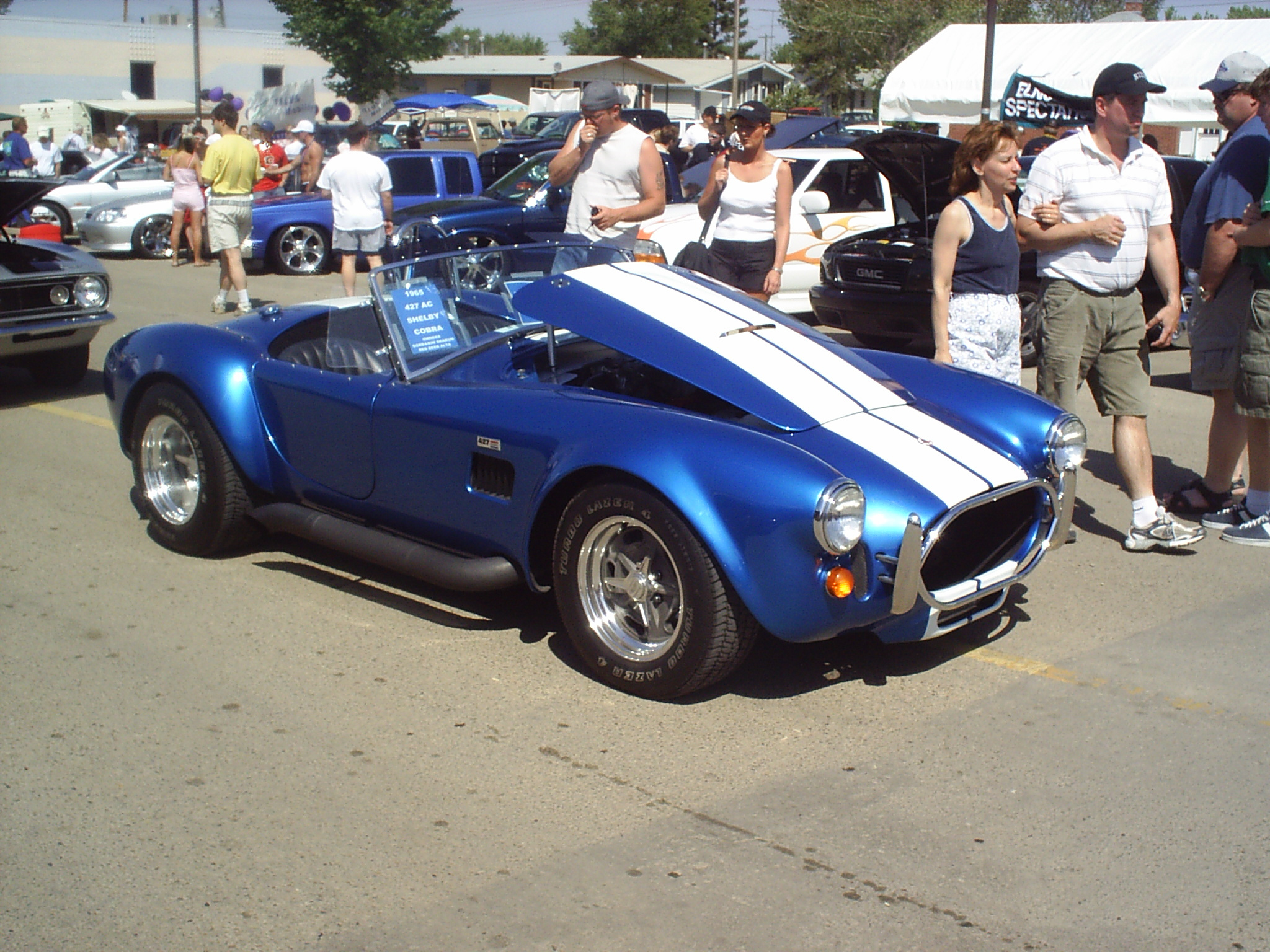
AC Cobra 427 classic blue with white stripes

A new chassis, designated Mark III, was designed in cooperation with Ford in Detroit. The Mark III chassis was built using 101.6 mm (4 in) main chassis tubes, up from 76.2 mm (3 in), and coil spring suspension all around (an especially significant change up front, where the previously used transverse leaf spring had done double duty as the top link). The new car also had wide fenders and a larger radiator opening. It was powered by the Ford 7.0 L (427 cu in) FE "side oiler" engine equipped with a single 4-barrel 780 CFM Holley carburetor rated at 317 kW (425 hp; 431 PS) at 6000 rpm and 651 N⋅m (480 lb⋅ft) at 3700 rpm of torque, which provided a top speed of 264 km/h (164 mph) in the standard model. The more powerful semi-competition (S/C) model was tuned to 362 kW (485 hp; 492 PS), and had a top speed of 298 km/h (185 mph).

=== Competition models (CSX/CSB 3001–3100) ===
Cobra Mark III production began on 1 January 1965; two prototypes had been sent to the United States in October 1964. Cars were sent to the US as unpainted rolling chassis, and they were fitted with engines and finished in Shelby's workshop.

Unfortunately, the MK III was not homologated for the 1965 racing season and was not raced by the Shelby team. Only 56 of the 100 cars required were produced when the FIA arrived in April, making these competition cars difficult to sell. Of those, 31 unsold competition models were fitted with windscreens and production dual-quad, side-oiler R-code 427s for street use. Called S/C for semi-competition, an original example can currently sell for US$1.5 million, making it one of the most valuable Cobra variants.

=== Production models (CSX/CSB 3101–3360) ===
Some 260 Cobra 427s were produced as street cars. The first 100 were fitted with fitted with dual-quad, top-oiler 427s and the next 105 or so were fitted with Ford's 428 FE engine. With a longer stroke and smaller bore than the 427, the oversquare V8 was a lower-cost engine intended for road use rather than racing, but in 1966 Police Interceptor trim made some 360hp. The final 55 cars reverted to the 427 side-oiler, but with the single 4 barrel carburetor on most of these late cars.

The AC Cobra was a financial failure that led Ford and Carroll Shelby to discontinue importing cars from England in 1967.

== AC 289 Sports ==
(COB/COX 6101–6132)

AC Cars kept producing the coil-spring AC Roadster with narrow fenders and a small block Ford 289. It was built and sold in Europe until late 1969.

== Packages ==
=== Dragon Snake ===
Shelby offered a drag racing package, known as the Dragon Snake, which won several NHRA National events with Bruce Larson or Ed Hedrick at the wheel of CSX2093.

Only six 289 Dragon Snake Cobras were produced by the factory: "2019", "2357" as factory team cars, and "2248", "2416", "2427", "2472" as private team cars. One 427 Dragon Snake, 3198, was produced.

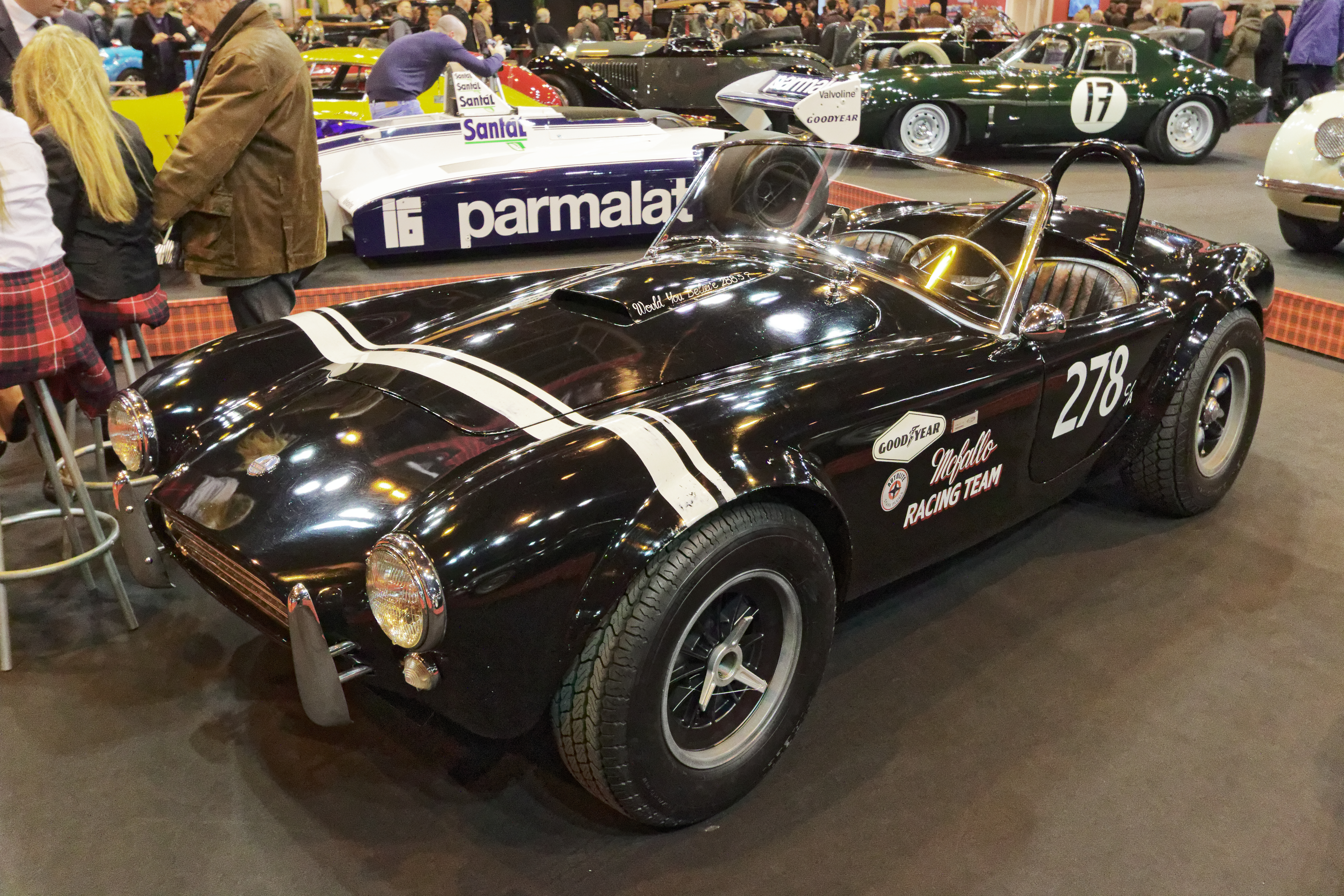
1963 AC Cobra 289 Dragon Snake

Cobras were also prepared by customers using the drag package. Examples include: "2075", "2093", "2109", "2353", and 3159 "King Cobra."

=== Slalom Snake ===
Designed for auto-cross events, only two examples were produced, the CSX2522 "Slalom Special", and the CSX2537 "Slalom Snake". Both had white exterior paint (with red racing stripes) and red leather interiors.

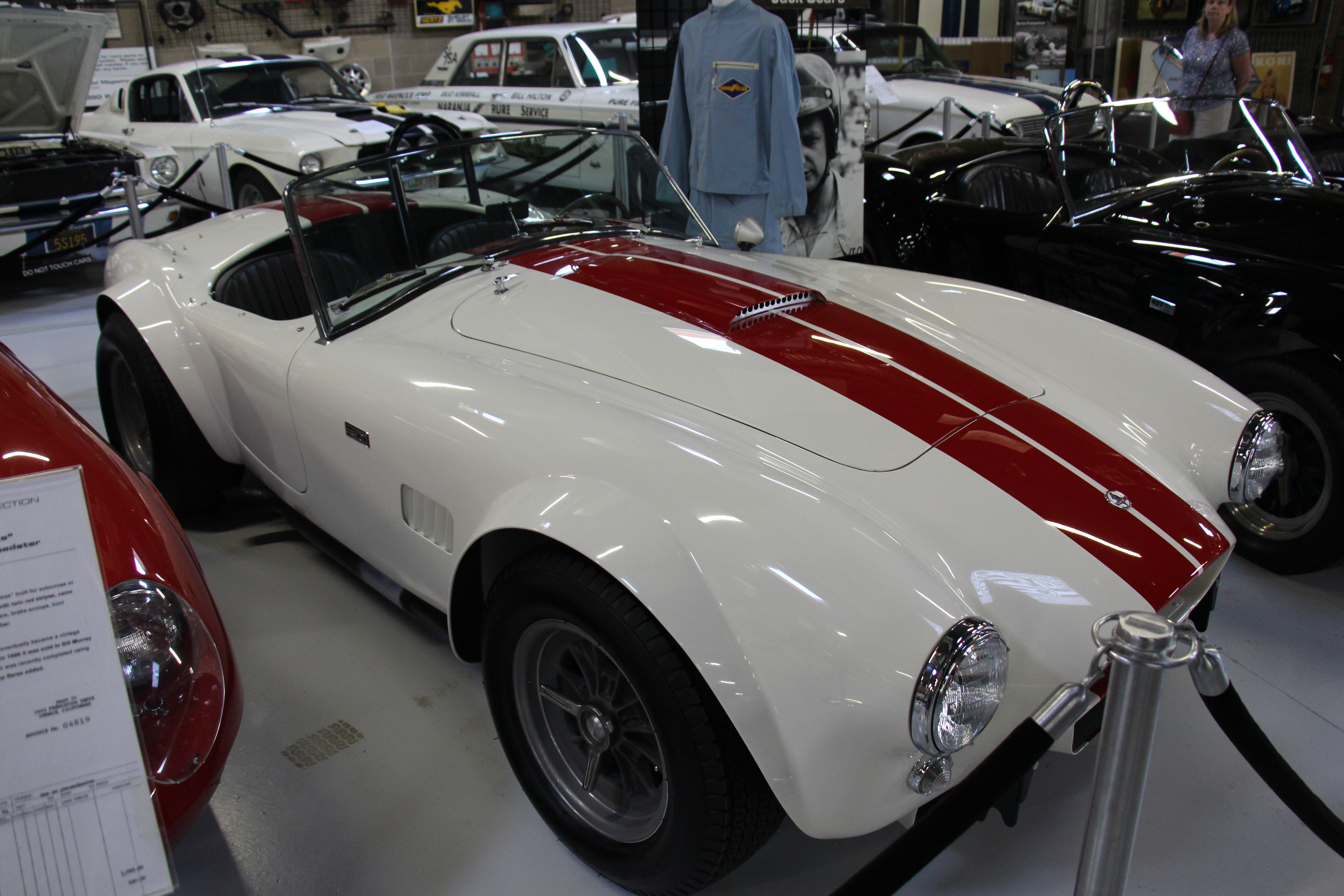
1964 Shelby Cobra Slalom Snake

Equipped almost identically to CSX2522, the second example had aluminum valve covers, a tuned air cleaner, a Smiths heater, seat belts, front and rear brake cooling ducts, a hood scoop, side exhausts and a painted roll bar (2522's roll bar was chromed). Suspension options included Koni shock absorbers, front and rear anti-roll bars, unpolished six-inch magnesium pin-drive wheels, and Goodyear Blue Streak Sports Car Special tires.

=== Super Snake ===
In 1966, CSX 3015 S/C, originally part of a European promotional tour, was converted into a special model called the Super Snake, the "Cobra to End All Cobras." This conversion called for making the original racing model street legal with mufflers, a windshield and bumpers amongst other modifications. But some things were not modified, including the racing rear end, brakes and headers. The most notable modification is the addition of Twin Paxton Superchargers, TPS.

Shelby crafted a second model, CSX 3303, from a street version. CSX 3303 was given to comedian Bill Cosby, his close friend. When Cosby attempted to drive CSX3303, he found very difficult to control; he later recounted the experience on his 1968 stand-up comedy album 200 M.P.H.. Cosby gave the car back to Shelby, who then shipped it out to one of his company's dealers in San Francisco, S&C Ford on Van Ness Avenue. S&C Ford then sold it to customer Tony Maxey. Maxey had his throttle stick while leaving a traffic stop, lost control and drove it off a cliff, landing in the Pacific Ocean waters.

Shelby used CSX 3015 as a personal car over the years, sometimes entering it into local races like the Turismos Visitadores Cannonball-Run race in Nevada, where he was "waking [up] whole towns, blowing out windows, throwing belts and catching fire a couple of times, but finishing." CSX3015 was auctioned on 22 January 2007, at the Barrett-Jackson Collector Car Event in Scottsdale, Arizona, for $5 million (~$7.47 million in 2025) plus commission (£2.8 million), a record for a vehicle made in the U.S.

== Adaptations ==
(CF/CFX 01–80)

AC produced the AC 428 Frua on a stretched Cobra 427 MK III coil spring chassis with a steel body designed and built by Pietro Frua. The car was built until 1973.

(EF/EFX 501–509)

The American Electric Car Company used an even more extensively modified chassis for their vehicles. A single EFX chassis was supplied to the United Kingdom with an engine and gearbox fitted.

GHIA SPYDER

(CSX 5001–5002)

One 244-centimetre (96 in) prototype chassis (CSX 3063) was shipped to Ghia in Italy in 1965 for a body styling exercise. This vehicle was first displayed during a European car show with a Cobra license tag. The car was written up in the Winter 65/66 edition of "Style Quarterly" magazine. Shelby American internal production records show that the car was shipped to Shelby American for evaluation and review. AC Cars Ltd internal production records show that Shelby American placed an order for two 96-inch chassis (CSX 5001–5002) in 1966. AC labeled these chassis as "GHIA CONVERTIBLE" in their factory ledger.

FORD XD COBRA

(CSX 3001)

Shelby American internal production records show that the car was shipped to Shelby American for evaluation and review in early 1966. The vehicle was returned to Ford and now resides in the Detroit Historical Museum.

== AutoKraft ==
Autokraft manufactured an AC 289 continuation car called the Autokraft Mk IV, basically a Mk III with a 4.95-litre (302 cu in) Ford V8 and Borg Warner T5 Transmission. The Mk IV also received an independent suspension.

In 1986, Autokraft (as a joint venture with Ford joining in 1987) purchased AC Cars, and produced the AC Mk IV Cobra, with a 186 kW (250 hp; 253 PS) at 4,200 rpm, 4,942-cubic-centimetre (301.6 cu in) Ford V8, which provided a top speed of 134 mph (215 km/h) and 0–62 mph (0–100 km/h) in 5.2 seconds.

At the 1990 Geneva Salon the Lightweight version was presented: weight was down to 1,070 kg (2,360 lb) (compared to 1,190 kg or 2,620 lb) and power was up to 276 kW (370 hp; 375 PS) at 5,750 rpm thanks to aluminum heads, a Holley four-barrel carburetor, and no catalytic converter. While the Lightweight did not meet US federal regulations, the Mk IV did, and 480 cars of all versions were built until 1996.

== AC Car Group ==
In 1996 the company was purchased by Pride Automotive. Two new 'Cobra' style cars were launched in 1997, the 'Superblower', an aluminium-bodied car with a supercharged 4,942-cubic-centimetre (301.6 cu in) Ford V8 providing 239 kW (320 hp; 324 PS) and the cheaper 'Carbon Road Series' (CRS) with a carbonfibre body and a 168 kW (225 hp; 228 PS) version of the Ford V8 engine. 22 Superblowers and 37 CRSs were built between 1997 and 2001.

In 1999, a limited edition run of 25 289 FIA Cobras were planned. Only 1 example was manufactured, chassis number COB 1001.

A further variant, 'the 212 S/C' with a 3,506-cubic-centimetre (213.9 cu in) 261 kW (350 hp; 355 PS) twin-turbocharged Lotus V8 engine was introduced in 2000, but only two examples were built.

In 2001, the company relocated its factory to Frimley, Surrey. By August 2002, the company was in a financial low and briefly acquired by Private Corp, who closed operations in October 2003. Only two models were produced, a FIA 289 (COX 2610), and a 427 Cobra (COX 3361). The cars were intended to be sold in the US market, through a new company, AC Cars USA, in Florida. Both cars were numbered following where the original ledger entries left off during the 1960s.

== AC Motor Holdings Ltd ==
On 8 July 2002, a new company was formed in Malta named AC Motor Holdings and was responsible for the branding of the company.

In late 2003, the Frimley factory was under the control of AC Motor Holdings.

On 4 December 2003, Shelby and AC announced a co-production of the CSX1000 and CSX 7500 series. Only 14 CSX1000, and 2 CSX 7500 cars were built by 2007.

Between 2004 and 2007, AC Motor Holdings produced the AC Mk V in their Malta factory. However, only 3 right-hand drive and 2 left-hand drive carbon-fibre AC Mk Vs powered by 254 kW (340 hp; 345 PS) 5-litre (305 cu in) Ford V8 engines were built before the Maltese operation closed.

== Acedes Holdings Llc ==
On 20 April 2008, AC announced its Heritage Series, the UK operations were granted to Brooklands Motor Company, dba AC Heritage. The US operations were granted to AC AutoKraft, Llc, of Michigan.

Both companies are licensed to produce traditional aluminum-body models: Ruddspeed, 289, and 427 continuation Aces and Cobras.

In 2009, AC licensed Gullwing GmbH in Germany, dba AC-Automotive, to produce the AC MK VI, with an aluminium coated composite body and powered by a 6.2-litre (380 cu in) 328-kilowatt (440 hp; 446 PS) LS3 Chevrolet engine, or a 410 kW (550 hp; 558 PS) supercharged version.

In 2012, the AC Mrk II Classic was released. Available in either aluminum or fiberglass bodies.

In 2017, the AC Mrk1 260 Legacy edition was released in a limited production of nine cars. Also released was the AC 378 a newer composite body version of the Cobra.

== Shelby Daytona Coupé ==
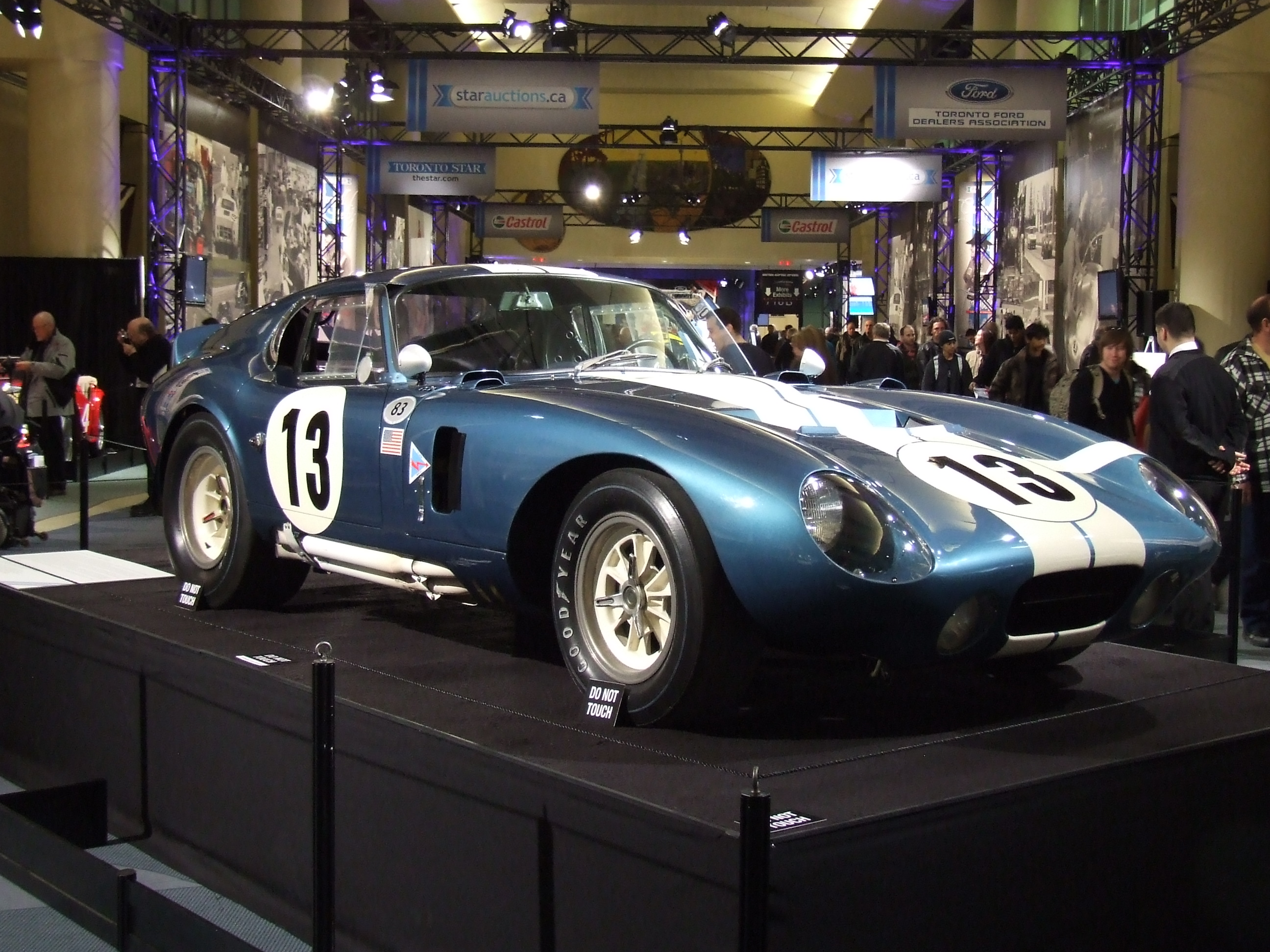
1964 Shelby Daytona Cobra Coupe (CSX2299)

In an effort to improve top speed along the legendary Mulsanne Straight at the 24 Hours of Le Mans race, a number of enclosed, coupé variations were constructed using the leafspring chassis and running gear of the AC/Shelby Cobra Mark II. The most famous and numerous of these were the official works Shelby Daytona Cobra Coupés. Six were constructed, each being subtly different from the rest.

AC Cars also produced a Le Mans coupé. The car was a one-off and was nearly destroyed after a high-speed tyre blow-out at the 1964 Le Mans race. The car was qualified conservatively second in GT. The race started well with the AC, chassis number A98, maintaining its position in the top two in GT and even leading the class for a time. This was not to last as an act of sabotage (newspaper in the fuel tank) began to block the fuel filter. The car lost time until this was diagnosed and cleaned out. The car proceeded on at the predetermined conservative lap time and for the next stint remained trouble free. The car was able to match the Shelby Daytona's speed despite running a higher differential ratio (2.88 instead of 3.07) and a lower state of engine tune for reliability (265 kW [355 hp; 360 PS] instead of the Daytona's 287 kW [385 hp; 390 PS]).

The Willment race team became interested in Shelby's Cobra-based coupé and inquired on purchasing one. Shelby turned down the offer, but supplied the drawings to Willment. Dubbed the Willment Cobra Coupé, this car was fully built by the JWA racing team and numbered 2131 on the frame.

== 427 Super Coupé ==
A prototype (CSX 3027) was to become 427 Coupé, but since the focus was shifted towards the GT program, this project received little attention. The bodywork and chassis were soon scrapped.

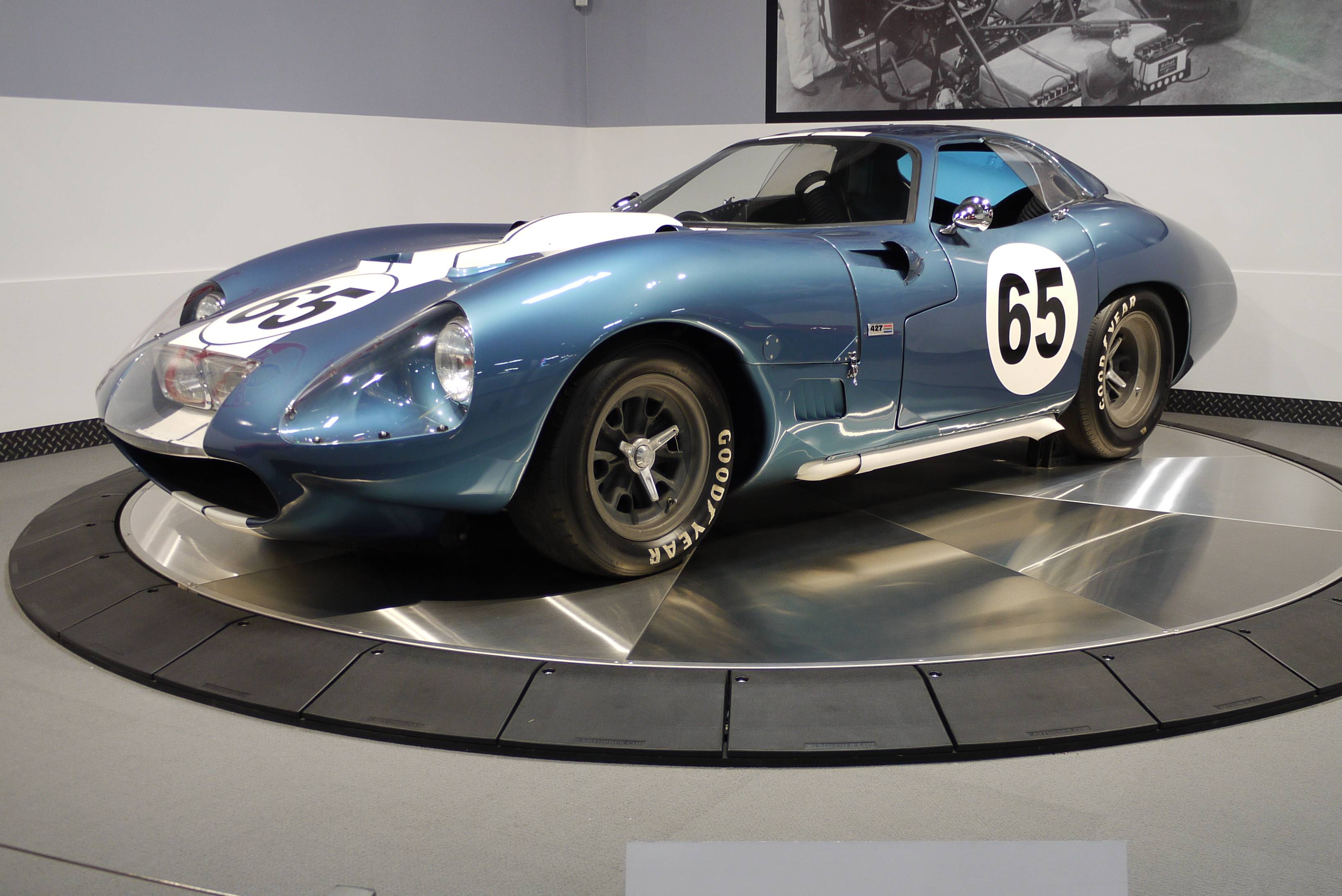
427 Super Coupe CSX3054

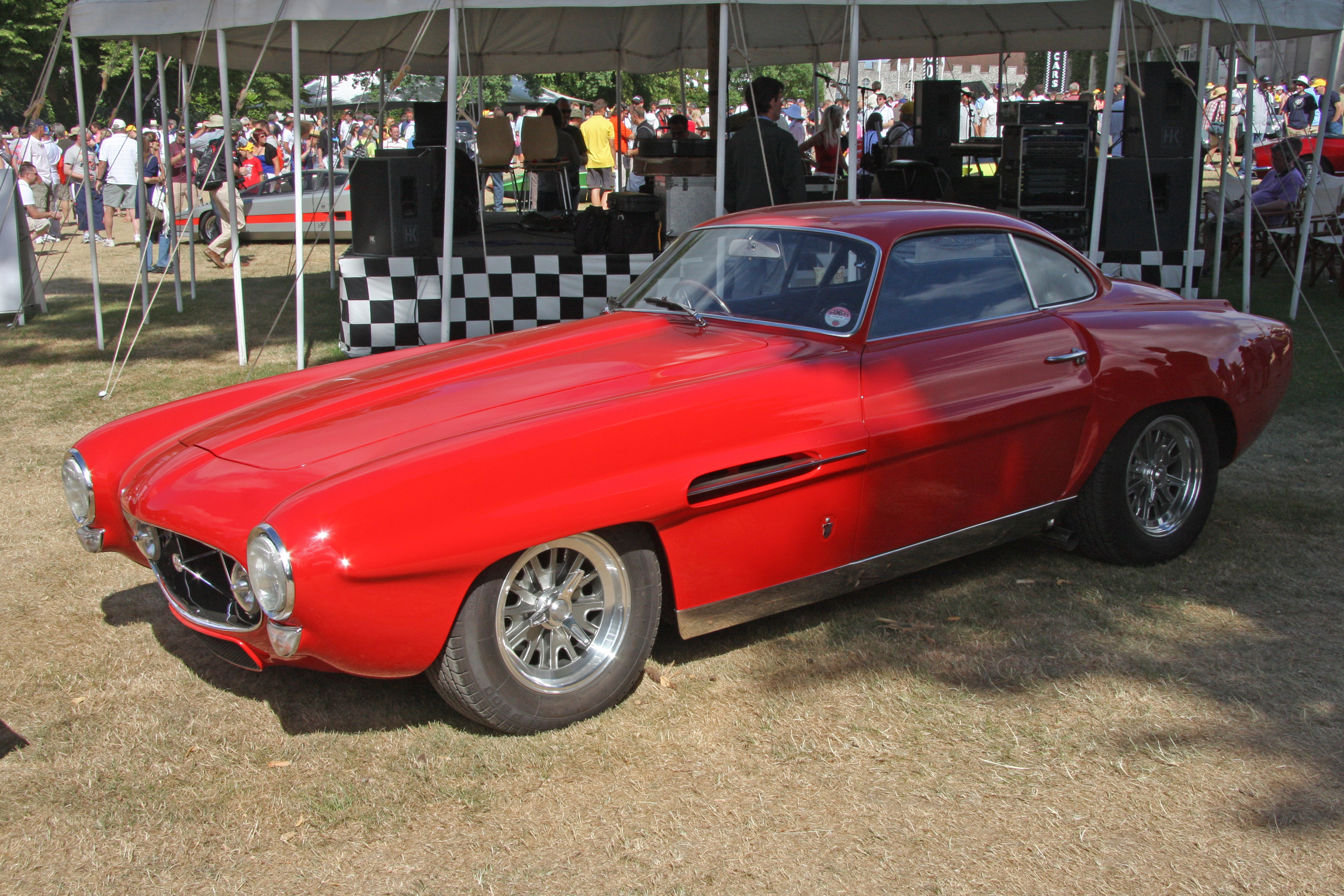
1965 Willment/Ghia Coupé (CSX3055)

Two further chassis were ordered number CSX 3054 and CSX 3055. This project was also abandoned with just CSX 3054 receiving a body. CSX 3055 was sold to the Willment Race Team and was fitted with a Ghia Supersonic body originally mounted on a Fiat 8V.

== Argentine manufacturing ==
In 2023, Argentine entrepreneur Federico Álvarez Castillo announced that he would manufacture Big Block 427 and Small Block 289 models under official license at his plant located in Pilar, Buenos Aires. The plan is to manufacture 12 units per year with the goal of exporting them to the Latin American market.

== Counterfeit Cobras ==
In 1993, the Los Angeles Times exposed a scheme by Shelby to counterfeit the AC Cobra. With the price of an original 7 L (427 cu in) Cobra skyrocketing, Shelby had requested the California Department of Motor Vehicles (the government agency responsible for titling vehicles and issuing operator permits) to issue 43 duplicate titles for vehicles that did not officially exist in company records. A letter from AC Cars confirmed the fact that the chassis numbers for which Shelby had obtained titles were never manufactured, at least not by AC Cars. Only 55 7 L (427 cu in) Cobras had been originally produced out of a block of serial numbers reserved for 100 vehicles. Shelby had taken advantage of a loophole in the California system that allowed one to obtain a duplicate title for a vehicle with only a written declaration, without the vehicle identification number appearing in the DMV's database or the declarant ever presenting an actual vehicle for inspection. Shelby admitted that the chassis had been manufactured in 1991 and 1992 by McCluskey Ltd, an engineering firm in Torrance, California, and were not original AC chassis, however Shelby denied having misled anyone and said he was a victim of a campaign by Brian Angliss, a British competitor, who owned AC at the time and was also building Cobras from the original tooling and wished to enhance his sales by smearing Shelby's car.

== Continuation cars ==
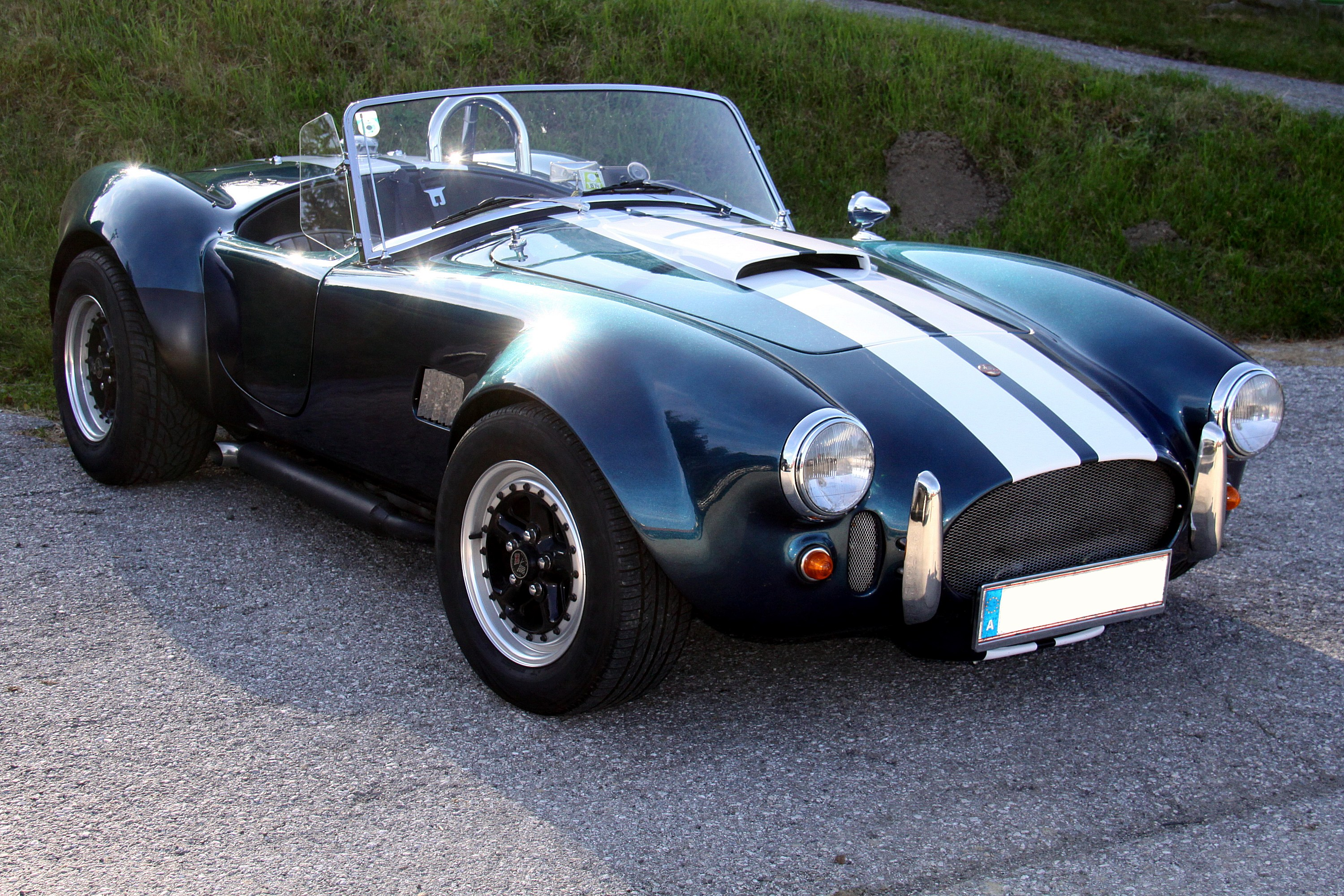
50th-anniversary Cobra Limited Edition CSX8000

Since the late 1980s onwards, various companies have built what are known in the hobby as "Continuation Cars".

Shelby authorized continuations of the original AC-built Cobra series. Produced in Las Vegas, Nevada, these cars retain the general style and appearance of their original 1960s ancestors, but are fitted with modern amenities. The initial version for continuation was a 427 S/C model which was represented in the CSX4000 series. This was meant to continue where the last 427 S/C production left off, at approximately serial number CSX3360 in the 1960s.

The initial CSX4000 series cars were completed from the chassis built by Mike McCluskey with NOS and reconditioned parts. Based in Torrance, Calif., McCluskey had been Shelby’s personal mechanic since the 1960s and was a well-established restorer and fabricator. Given the value of the vehicle many "extra" cars have appeared over the years, even some sharing the same chassis number. Gradually as the vintage parts supply ran low, newly constructed frames and body panels were obtained from a variety of suppliers. The production of chassis numbers CSX4001 to CSX4999 took roughly 20 years and many different business relationships to complete.

During the continuation period, Kirkham Motorsports were contracted by Shelby to produce rolling Cobra body/chassis units but this did not end amicably. Pete Brock said in a Hot Rod magazine interview "Shelby would go to [Kirkhams] and say he would buy their entire year’s worth of production and sign a contract. They called me and asked if they should do it and I said, "As long as you get the money up front, but if you let a car out the door, you'll lose money." Shelby paid that way for two years and then finally [Kirkhams] got a great big order and Shelby's truck driver said he forgot to bring the check. He went back with a bunch of cars on the transporter and Shelby told them he wasn't going to pay them—that they owed it to him. That almost put [Kirkhams] out of business."

In 2009, CSX4999 was produced, concluding the 4000 series. Production has continued with the CSX6000 serial numbers, featuring "coil over" suspension.

The 289 FIA "leaf spring" race version of the car is reproduced as CSX7000, and the original "slab side" leaf spring street car is the CSX8000 series. The Daytona Coupé is reproduced as the CSX 9000 series.

To date most continuations are produced in fiberglass, with some ordering cars with aluminium or carbon-fibre bodywork.

In 2004, at the North American International Auto Show in Detroit, Ford unveiled a concept for a modernized AC Cobra. The Ford Shelby Cobra Concept was a continuation of Ford's effort to bring back the retro sports cars that had been successful in the 1960s, including the Ford GT40 and the fifth generation Ford Mustang.

In 2014, Shelby American announced a limited edition production of 50 cars for the 50th anniversary of the original 427 Shelby Cobra.

== See also ==
- Bill Thomas Cheetah, the 1963-started, Chevrolet Corvette-based private-venture challenger to the Cobra
- The Snake and the Stallion
- Timeline of most powerful production cars
