= AC Aceca =

Aceca
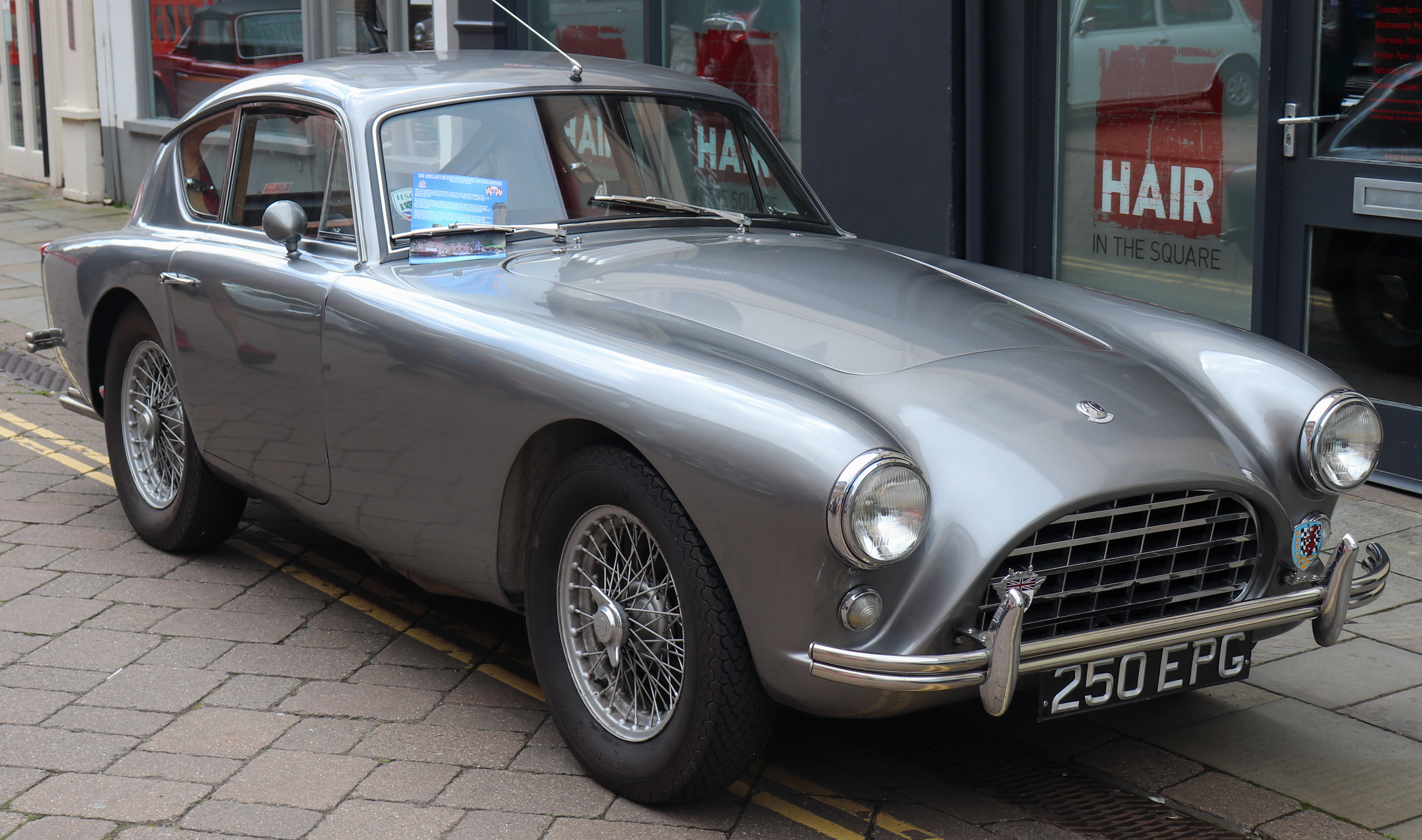
- 1958 AC Aceca

Overview
- Manufacturer: AC Cars
- Production: 1954–1963

Body and chassis
- Class: Grand tourer
- Related: AC Ace; AC Greyhound

Powertrain
- Engine: 2.0 or 2.6 L I6
- Transmission: 4-speed manual

Dimensions
- Wheelbase: 90 in (2,286 mm)
- Length: 153.5 in (3,899 mm)
- Width: 61 in (1,549 mm)
- Curb weight: 2,120 lb (962 kg)

The Aceca (UK: /ˌæˈsiːˌkə/) is a fixed head coupé built by AC Cars from 1954 until 1963. Three variations of the car were offered: the original Aceca, with an engine from AC; the Aceca-Bristol, with an engine from Bristol Cars; and the Aceca 2.6, with a tuned Ford engine.

== Overview ==
The Aceca is a hand-built grand tourer in the British tradition, with ash wood and steel tubing used in its construction. One notable feature is the hatchback at the rear, making the Aceca only the second car, after the 1953 Aston Martin DB2/4, to incorporate this element.

The styling of the AC Ace, on which the Aceca is based, is generally believed to have been inspired by, or a direct copy of, the Ferrari 166 MM barchetta.

The car is relatively light, owing to its tubular ladder frame and aluminium body panels. Large 16" spoked road wheels and near 50/50 weight distribution allowed exceptional handling on substandard road surfaces. Later Acecas feature front-wheel disc brakes (optional in 1957, standard from 1958 on), while all share transverse leaf spring independent front and rear suspensions, articulated rear half-axles, worm-gear steering, an optional overdrive on second, third and fourth gears, curved windscreen, and leather-covered bucket seats. The differential has a rubber mounting, and additional fibreglass panels were installed between the interior bulkheads to reduce noise in the cabin.

== Models ==
The main difference between the Aceca, the Aceca-Bristol, and the Aceca 2.6 are their engines. All three use straight-six engines, but from different manufacturers.

=== Original Aceca ===
When launched in 1954, the only engine available in the Aceca was AC's own Light Six straight six engine. This 2.0 L (1,991 cc; 121.5 cu in) engine was first produced in 1919 by John Weller, who was one of the original founders of AC. The engine has an aluminium cylinder block and cast iron head. Often called a single overhead camshaft design, the engine has a single cam-in-head, which operates the valves through rocker arms. Power outputs ranged from 85 to 105 bhp (63 to 78 kW) during production, which ended in 1961.

=== Aceca-Bristol ===
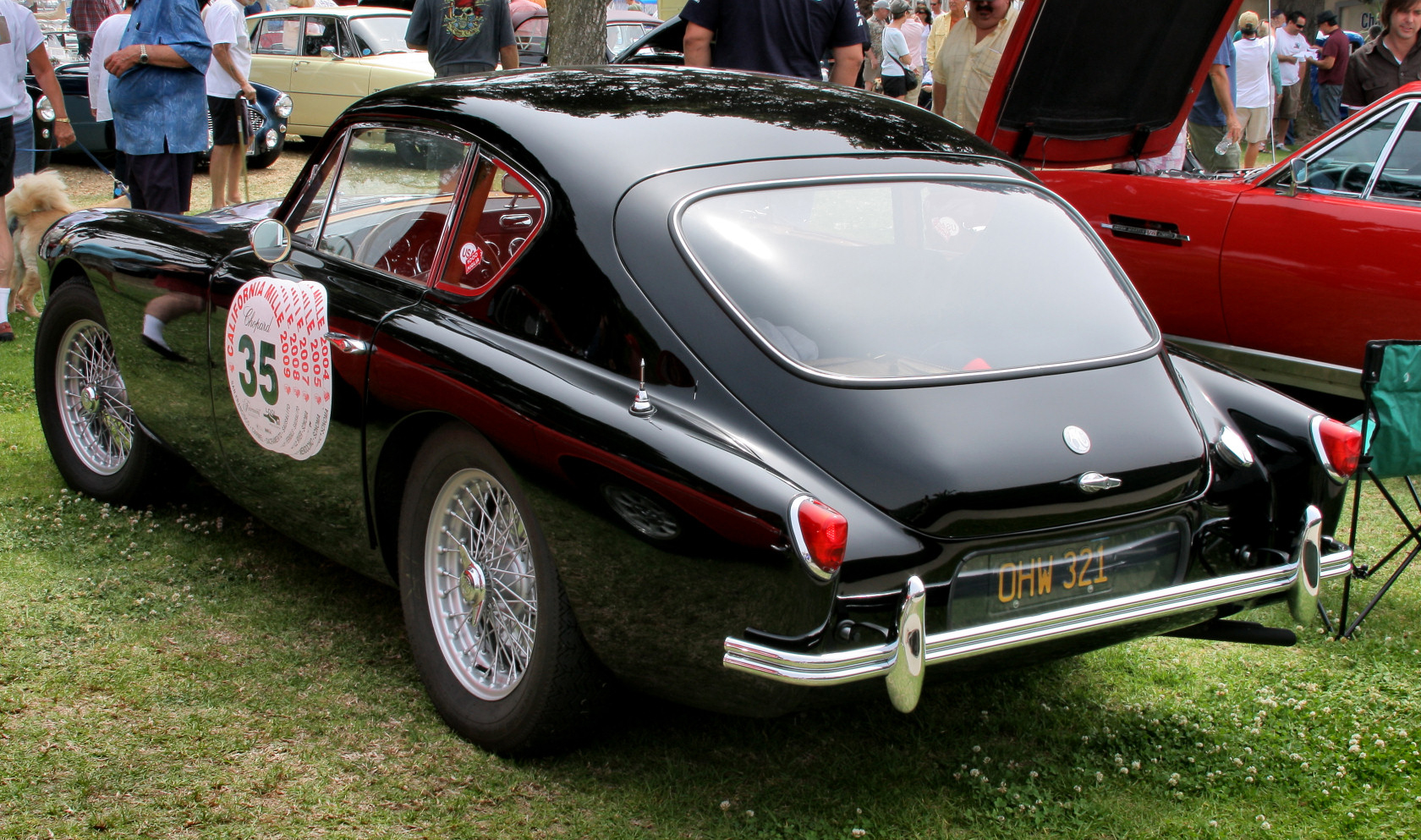
1957 AC Aceca-Bristol

Beginning in 1956 and lasting until 1963, AC offered an Aceca powered by an engine from Bristol Cars. The straight-six Bristol engine is based on the BMW M328 engine of 1936, with a cylinder block of cast chromium-steel alloy with dry liners of Brivadium austenitic steel and an aluminium cylinder head. It has a single camshaft in the block, with pushrods running vertically to a rocker shaft for the intake valves, and an additional six pushrods in tubes running horizontally from the intake rocker shaft across the top of the head to operate the exhaust rockers. The two inclined rocker covers give the engine an appearance similar to that of an overhead camshaft arrangement. Three inline Solex downdraught carburettors were bolted directly to the cylinder head casting using small adaptor plates.

This 2.0 L (1,971 cc; 120.3 cu in) engine was offered in different stages of tune. The base Type 100B engine produces 105 hp (78 kW), while the Type 100D makes 125 hp (93 kW). In the UK, the basic car cost £1722.

=== Aceca 2.6 ===
The Aceca 2.6 debuted in 1961, and was offered until the end of production in 1963. It has a 2.6 L (2,553 cc; 155.8 cu in) version of the overhead valve Ford Zephyr 6 engine specially tuned by Ken Rudd's Ruddspeed company for use in the Aceca. The Ruddspeed engine was offered in four (originally five) levels of tune, with power outputs of up to 170 bhp (127 kW).

== Chassis numbers and production ==
As with the Ace, AC used chassis numbers beginning with AE for cars with the AC Light Six, BE for Bristol-powered cars, and RS for those equipped with the Ruddspeed-tuned Ford unit. An "X" following the first two letters indicated an export model with left-hand drive.

151 Acecas, 169 Aceca-Bristols and 8 Aceca 2.6es had been built when production halted in 1963.

== Specials and modified cars ==
=== AC Aceca 'Bluebird' VPL 441 ===
In 1954 the AC Aceca was launched at the Earls Court Motor Show in London. The car displayed on the stand is the prototype Aceca, later registered as VPL 441.

As the first Aceca, there were differences between VPL 441 and the production models. At the motor show, the car was shod with white-wall tyres, and the Aceca name in chrome metal badging was affixed to the wings and tailgate. The windscreen is flat, rather than curved glass as in production Acecas. It also has overriders rather than the production tubular bumpers.

From 1954 to 1956 VPL 441 was used by water- and land-speed record holder Donald Campbell as his personal vehicle. Campbell had the car painted with the leftover ultramarine "Bluebird Blue" used on his K7 hydroplane. During the time that Campbell was using the car, its original AC Light Six engine was upgraded to a Bristol 100B. Campbell returned the car to AC at the end of the three-year period.

VPL 441 then passed through a series of owners, and eventually was left abandoned in a farmyard. After this, it was bought by a couple named Nickless, who restored the car and campaigned it in sprint races and hill-climbs. After another round of ownership changes, Kevin Shilling acquired the car in 2014 and began an extensive restoration that was completed in 2018. The car was loaned to the Lakeland Motor Museum.

=== AC Aceca-Aigle ===
Hubert Patthey was the importer of AC Cars for Switzerland. He created or influenced the creation of more than one AC model. Patthey had three Aceca-Bristols customised by the carrozzeria Ghia-Aigle, which had been a subsidiary of Carrozzeria Ghia until 1953. The revised body had a lower tapering nose, with headlamps recessed into the front wings with transparent covers. By 2016, of the three cars built, one was destroyed in 1965, one was in Germany in need of restoration, and one, a 1956 model, was restored and drivable.

=== AC Aceca Triumph ===
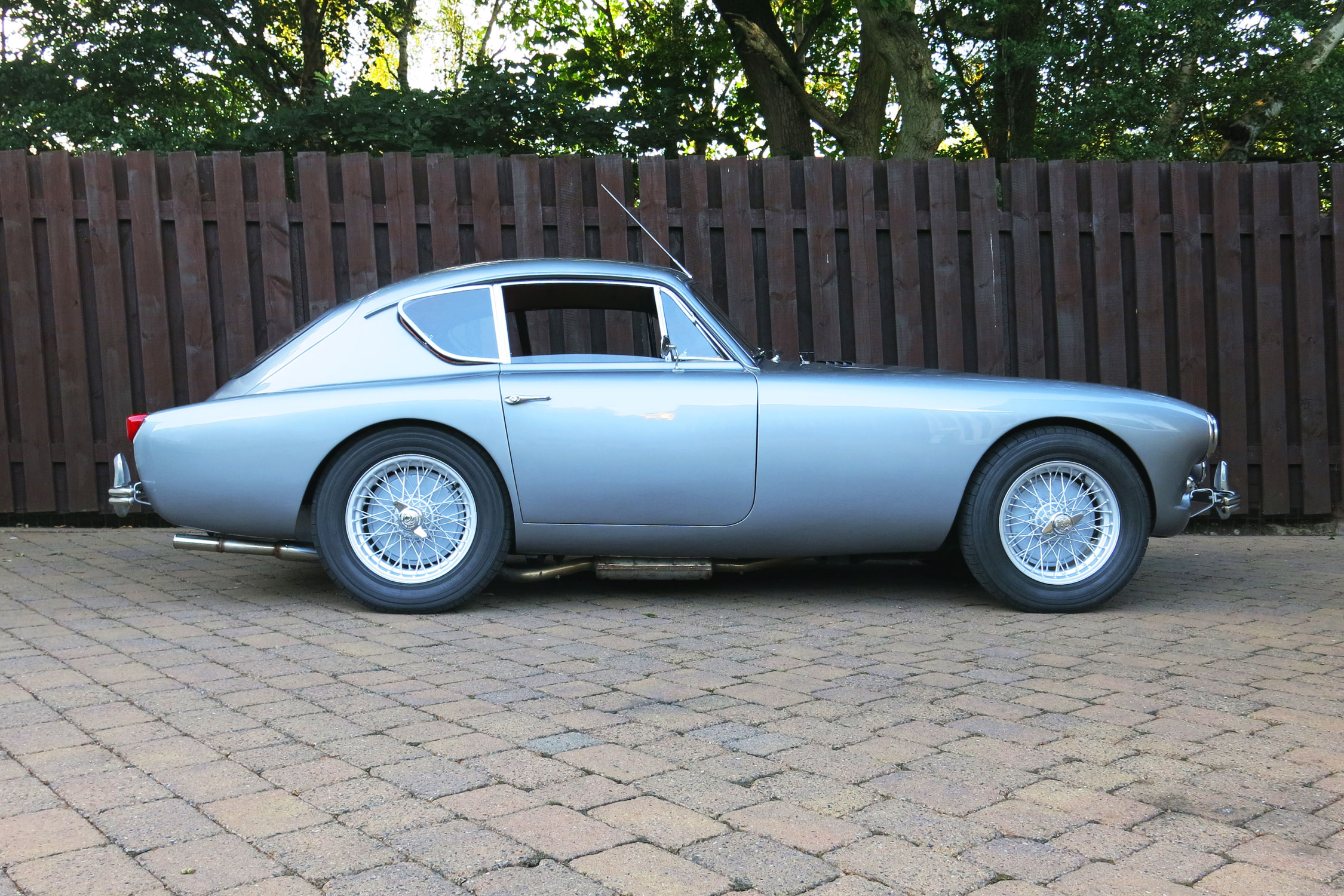
AC Aceca Triumph

On 2 July 1957, a single AC Aceca was completed with a Triumph engine installed as original equipment by the factory. The car has chassis number TAE 618, the prepended "T" standing for "Triumph", and was a prototype of a lower-cost option than the Bristol-engine Acecas, as AC sought a replacement for its Light Six engine which had reached the end of its development.

Instead of a six-cylinder engine, TAE 618 is powered by the same version of the Standard wet liner inline-four engine that was used in the contemporary Triumph TR3 and TR3A. This engine displaces 2.0 L (1,991 cc; 121.5 cu in), and produces 100 hp (75 kW). The transmission is a four-speed unit, with overdrive on third and fourth. The car was finished in gunmetal grey for the body and red for the interior.

The AC Aceca Triumph was the subject of a restoration that was made into series 4, episode 2 of the Car SOS television series.

=== AC Aceca Bristol wide-body special ===
In 1959 AC completed a special one-off Aceca-Bristol. Visually this car is distinguished by its being four inches wider than a standard Aceca, and by the small arch extensions over the wheels. Mechanically it also dispenses with the transverse leaf suspension of the standard model in favour of a coil-over-damper suspension, and rack and pinion steering gear instead of the usual worm and sector system. Used extensively by Charles Hurlock after completion, it was informally known as "Mr. Charles' car".

=== AC Aceca 240 SPF ===
The 1960 AC Aceca registered 240 SPF has had three engines over its lifetime. It originally left the factory with a Bristol engine but the owner, apparently uncomfortable with the performance of the Bristol six, returned the car to Thames Ditton, where an AC Light Six was substituted. At a later date, during a complete rebuild of the AC engine, a tuned 2.5-litre Triumph straight-six engine was installed. After the rebuild of the AC engine was completed, the car continued with the Triumph six, while the AC engine remained in storage to preserve the provenance of the car.

=== AC Aceca-Buick ===
In the early 1960s, American Rip Carter created an engine-swapped Aceca coupé. Working out of his shop, Carter's Foreign Car Service in Bell, California, Carter installed an aluminum-block Buick 215 V8 in place of the AC Light Six. The Buick V8 had twice the power output of the original engine, but weighed less.

To accommodate the wider V8, Carter narrowed the passenger's footwell by three inches, making it the same width as the driver's. The engine was mounted forward in the chassis, which did not leave enough room for an engine-driven cooling fan, although the stock AC radiator seemed to cool the engine adequately without the extra airflow. A plan to add an electric fan was considered.

Changes to the placement of the chassis tubes necessitated fabricating a new exhaust manifold. The original 4-speed manual transmission was replaced by a 2-speed automatic. The driveshaft was a shortened part from a Jaguar Mk VII, while a generator from an Austin-Healey Sprite with a pulley from a Mini-Minor supplied 12 volt power.
