= The Snake and the Stallion =

Documentary film

- Written by: Richard Symons
- Directed by: Richard Symons
- Narrated by: Robbie Coltrane
- Country of origin: United Kingdom
- Original language: English

Production
- Producers: Hamish Barbour and Richard Klein
- Running time: 60 minutes
- Production company: Spirit Level Film

Original release
- Release: 2002

The Snake and the Stallion, also known as Cobra Ferrari Wars, is a film that documents the rivalry between Texas chicken farmer turned American car producer Carroll Shelby and the Italian automotive entrepreneur Enzo Ferrari.

== Release ==
The Snake and the Stallion aired on the BBC on Monday 17 June 2002 and was subsequently released on DVD in 2005. A remastered collector's edition of the film was released on DVD in 2008.

== Synopsis ==
Richard Symons's documentary recounts the origins and rise to racing history of the AC Cobra, the car requested by Carroll Shelby. The film details the history of the Cobra and Carroll Shelby's racing career from its humble beginnings to the 1959 victory at the 24 Hours of Le Mans with Roy Salvadori at the wheel of an Aston Martin DBR1. The story goes on to explain Shelby's motivation to take on the might of Ferrari with the help of Ford and AC of England (who were then manufacturing invalid carriages as well as sports cars) and why Carroll Shelby had to retire from racing.

Carroll Shelby was closely involved in the making of the documentary, stating "I spent a whole lot of time with Richard on this and he’s really nailed it. Got all the right people, from Dan Gurney to Lee Iacocca. It’s a wonderful story and I’ve never seen anybody tell it better. I’m very proud to have been part of it".

== Reception ==
Simon Arron of The Daily Telegraph wrote, "There isn't a great deal in the way of contemporary footage (although the surviving material is pleasingly evocative), so the bulk of the story is told by those who took part. Their narrative is an undiluted treat." Of the two-DVD version released in 2005, The Province said, "Its fast-pace, 1960s-era soundtrack and split-screen scenes make it compelling viewing." News Letter found the documentary to be "a compelling tale of courage and dogged determination" and recommended it for "petrolheads and those intrigued by this titanic David and Goliath struggle". John Connolly of The Australian wrote, "Without doubt the best racing documentary ever".

== See also ==
- Ford vs. Ferrari
