= AC Ace =

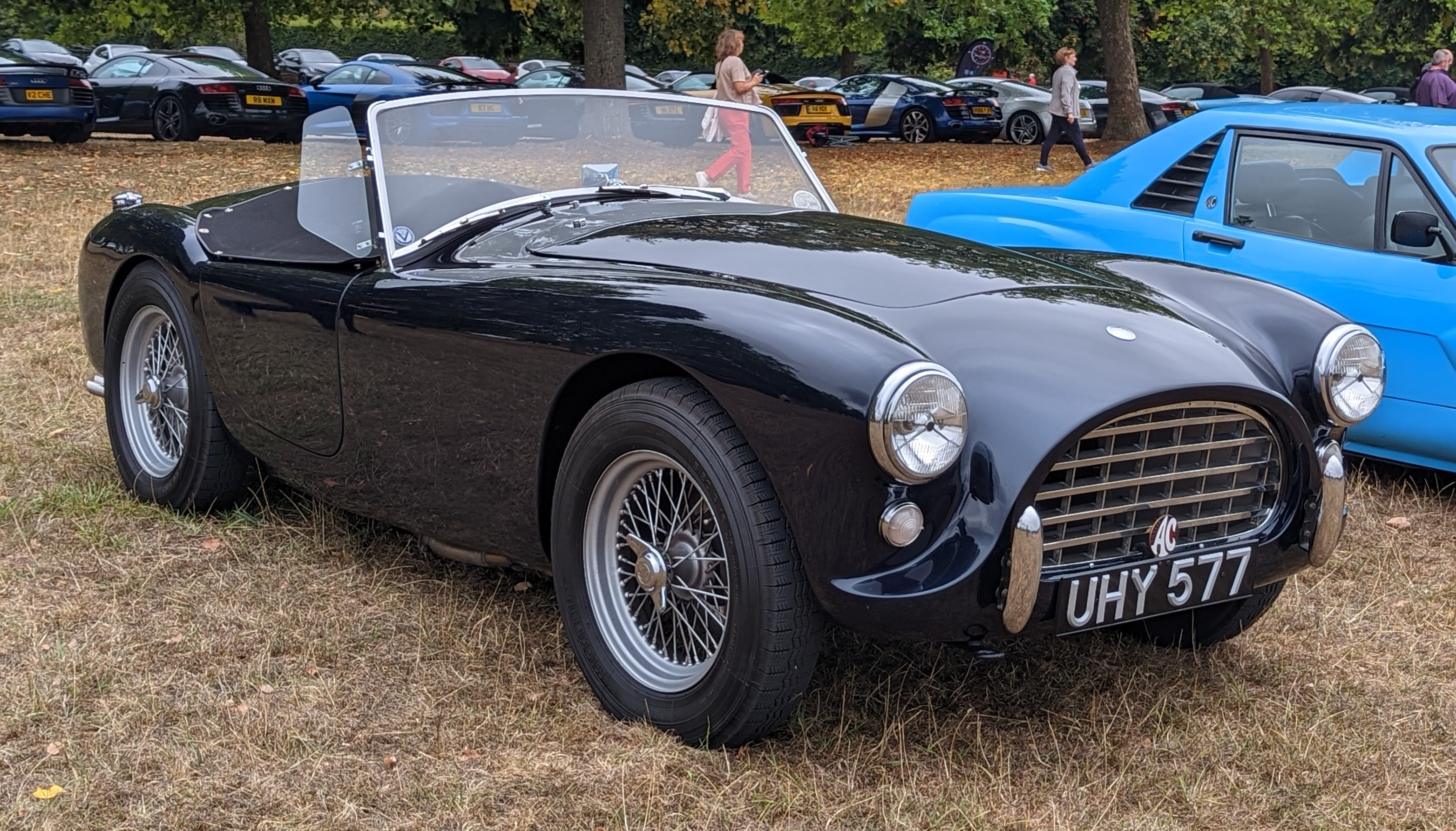
- 1953–1963 AC Ace

Overview
- Manufacturer: AC Cars
- Production: 1953–1963
- Designer: John Tojeiro

Body and chassis
- Body style: 2-door roadster
- Related: AC Aceca; AC Greyhound; AC Cobra

Powertrain
- Engine: 2.0 L I6 (AC); 2.0 L I6 (Bristol); 2.6 L I6 (Ford)
- Transmission: 4-speed manual (With overdrive available)

Dimensions
- Wheelbase: 90 in (2,286 mm)
- Length: 152 in (3,861 mm)
- Width: 59.5 in (1,511 mm)
- Height: 49 in (1,245 mm)
- Curb weight: 1,920 lb (871 kg)

Chronology
- Successor: AC Cobra

The AC Ace is a sports car produced by AC Cars of Thames Ditton, England, from 1953 until 1963. There were three main versions: the original AC Ace, the Ace Bristol, and the Ace 2.6, differentiated by the type of engine installed. About 220 AC Aces and 466 Ace-Bristol cars were produced during its 10 year run. The AC Ace was the base car from which the original AC Cobra was developed.

== History ==
AC resumed civilian production after the Second World War with the 2-Litre range of cars in 1947, but it was with the Ace sports car of 1953 that the company really made its reputation in the post war years. Casting around for a replacement for the ageing 2-Litre, AC took up a design by John Tojeiro that used a light, ladder-type tubular frame, all independent transverse leaf spring suspension, and an open two-seater alloy body possibly inspired by the Ferrari 166 MM barchetta.

Joining the Ace in 1954 was the Aceca hard top coupé, which had an early form of hatchback rear door but used a classic timber framed alloy body.

For both the Ace and the Aceca, AC used chassis numbers beginning with AE for AC-engined cars, BE for Bristol-engined ones, and RS for those equipped with the Ford unit. An "X" following the first two letters indicated an export model.

In 1961 Bristol stopped building the 2.2-litre version of their six cylinder engine for internal use, but agreed to continue producing the 2-litre version for AC until 1963. At the same time, the AC six cylinder engine had reached the end of its development potential.

In 1961, Texan Carroll Shelby approached AC's owner, Charles Hurlock, with a proposal to install a Ford V8 in the Ace chassis. AC agreed, and began adapting an Ace 2.6 to accommodate one of Ford's new small V8s. Shelby arranged for Ford to provide two engines, and shipped a 3.6 L (221 cu in) version to Thames Ditton for the new car. Among the many changes made to accommodate the engine's greater power and torque was the selection of a Salisbury 4HU differential with inboard brakes, as used on the Jaguar E-type. Built on chassis CSX2000, AC dubbed the car the AC Ace 3.6. Reportedly complete late in 1961 and tested by AC in January 1962, the engine was removed and the car was shipped to the United States, where Shelby's crew installed a new 260 cu in (4.3 L) version of the Ford V8. CSX2000 is considered to be the very first AC Cobra.

Production of the Ace ended one year after the debut of the AC Cobra.

== AC engine cars ==
Early cars used AC's own 100 bhp (75 kW) two-litre overhead cam straight-six engine first seen soon after the end of the First World War, which, according to a 1954 road test by Motor magazine, gave a top speed of 103 mph (166 km/h) and 0–60 mph (0–100 km/h) in 11.4 seconds and a fuel consumption of 25.2 miles per imperial gallon (11.2 L/100 km; 21.0 mpg_{‑US}). It was hardly a sporting engine however, and it was felt that something more modern and powerful was required to put the modern chassis to good use.

== Bristol engine cars ==
From 1956, there was the option of Bristol Cars' 2-litre 120 bhp (89 kW) straight-six with 3 downdraught carburettors and Bristol four-speed gearbox. Top speed rose to 116 mph (187 km/h) with 0–60 mph (0–100 km/h) in the nine second bracket. Overdrive was available from 1956, and front disc brakes were an option from 1957, then standardised for 1958 on.

The Bristol engine was offered until the end of Ace production.

== Ford/Ruddspeed engine cars ==
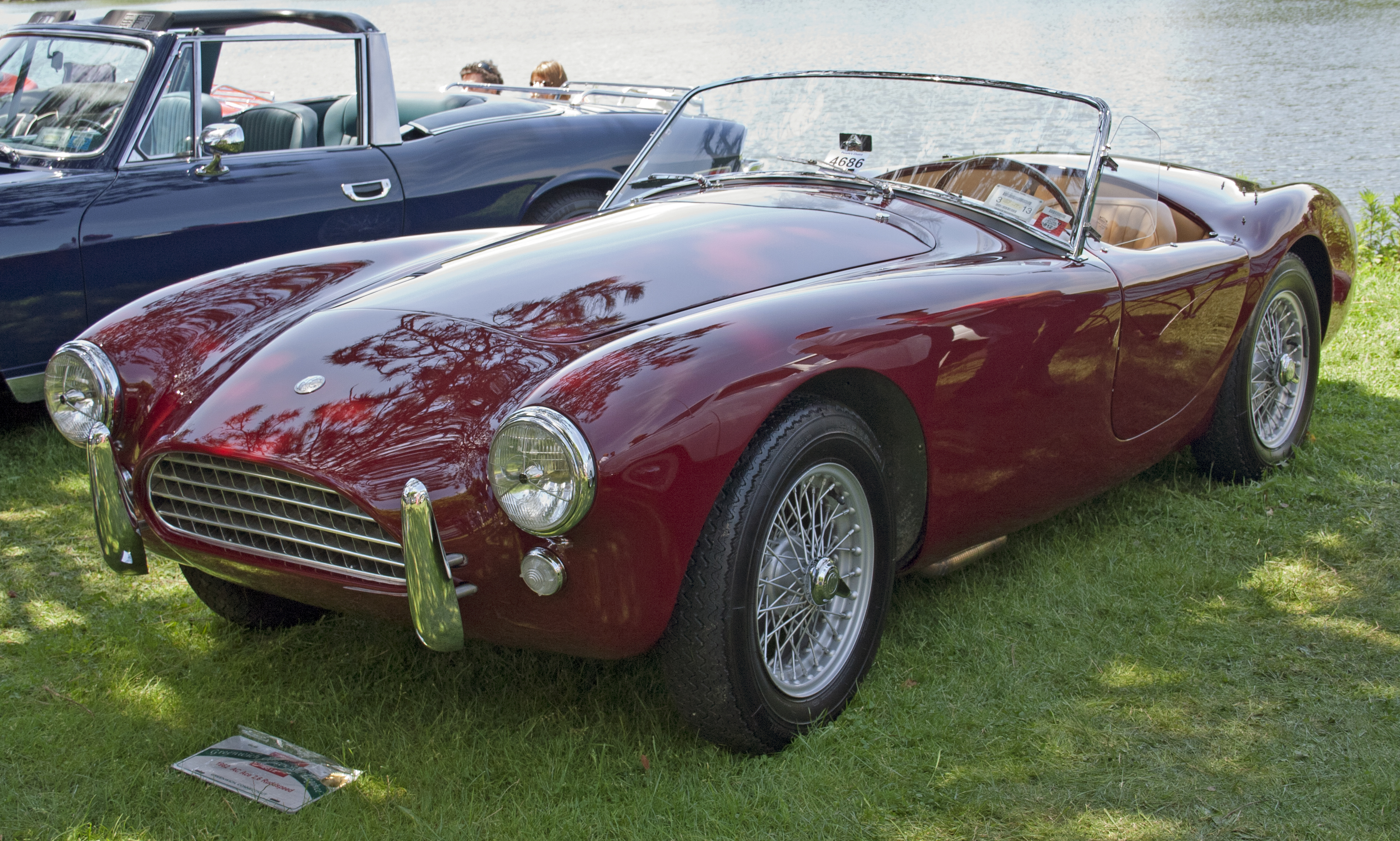
1962 2.6-litre Ruddspeed-engined Ace

In 1961 a new 2.6 L (2,553 cc; 155.8 cu in) straight-six 'Ruddspeed' option became available, which was a version of the Ford Zephyr 6 engine tuned by Ken Rudd. It used three Weber or SU carburettors and either a cast iron Ford cylinder head, either stock or modified, or a 'Mays' alloy head. This setup boosted the car's performance further, with some versions tuned to 170 bhp (127 kW), providing a top speed of 130 mph (209 km/h) and 0–60 mph (0–100 km/h) in 8.1 seconds. The AC-powered chassis AE 1191 was taken off the line and was renumbered as RS 5000 to become the prototype Ace 2.6, but without the subsequent changes AC made to the bodywork for the other 2.6es.

To fit the Zephyr 6 engine, AC had to modify the frame and relocate the steering box. The reduced height of the Ford engine also allowed them to completely change the nose of the car, which included a lower bonnet and a smaller grille, changes which were carried over to the Cobra but are often mistakenly attributed to Carroll Shelby.

It was not long before the Cobra drew away the attention of buyers, so only 37 of the 2.6 models were made.

== Technical data ==
AC Ace (1953–1964)
	Ace (1953–64)	Ace Bristol (1956–64)	Ace 2.6 (1961–63)
Engine:	Straight-six (four-stroke)		
Engine type:	AC Light Six	Bristol Type 100B/100D	Ford Zephyr 6/Ruddspeed
Displacement:	1,991 cc (121.5 cu in)	1,971 cc (120.3 cu in)	2,553 cc (155.8 cu in)
Bore × Stroke:	65 mm × 100 mm (2.6 in × 3.9 in)	66 mm × 96 mm (2.6 in × 3.8 in)	82.55 mm × 79.5 mm (3.3 in × 3.1 in)
Maximum power:	85 bhp (86 PS; 63 kW) at 4500 rpm 90 bhp (91 PS; 67 kW) at 4500 rpm 102 bhp (103 PS; 76 kW) at 5000 rpm	105 bhp (106 PS; 78 kW) at 5000 rpm (Type 100B); 128 bhp (130 PS; 95 kW) at 5750 rpm (Type 100D)	90 bhp (91 PS; 67 kW) at 4500 rpm 100 bhp (101 PS; 75 kW) (Stage 1); 125 bhp (127 PS; 93 kW) (Stage 2); 150 bhp (152 PS; 112 kW) (Stage 3); 170 bhp (172 PS; 127 kW) (Stage 4)
Maximum torque:	149 N⋅m (110 ft⋅lb) at 2500 rpm (85 bhp); 149 N⋅m (110 ft⋅lb) at 2500 rpm (90 bhp); 163 N⋅m (120 ft⋅lb) at 3000 rpm (102 bhp)	142 N⋅m (105 ft⋅lb) at 3750 rpm (Type 100B); 167 N⋅m (123 ft⋅lb) at 4500 rpm (Type 100D)	180 N⋅m (133 ft⋅lb) at 2000 rpm (Stage 1); 209 N⋅m (154 ft⋅lb) at 3000 rpm (Stage 4)
Carburation:	3 × SU	3 × Solex	1 × Zenith (Base); 3 × SU (Stages 1–3); 3 × Weber (Stage 4)
Valvetrain:	SOHC, chain-driven	Single chain-driven cam-in-block, pushrods, rocker arms	Single gear-driven cam-in-block, pushrods, rocker arms
Cooling:	Water-cooled		
Transmission:	4-speed manual (Optional overdrive in 1956)		
Transmission type:	Moss	Bristol	AC alloy case with TR3 gears
Front suspension:	Lower wishbone, upper transverse leaf spring, tubular shock absorbers		
Rear suspension:	Wide lower arm, upper transverse leaf spring, tubular shock absorbers		
Brakes:	Drum/drum (front discs optional in 1957, standard in 1958/59)		
Chassis:	Ladder chassis of large diameter round cross-section steel tube, tubular steel scuttle hoop		
Body:	Hand-formed, welded aluminium, tubular steel support frame		
Track f/r:	1,270 / 1,270 mm (50.0 / 50.0 in)		
Wheelbase:	2,286 mm (90.0 in)		
Length:	3,848 mm (151.5 in)		3,874 mm (152.5 in)
Unladen weight:	762–780 kg (1,680–1,720 lb)	762–894 kg (1,680–1,971 lb)	792–813 kg (1,746–1,792 lb)
Top speed:	166 km/h (103 mph) (85 bhp); 166 km/h (103 mph) (90 bhp); 167 km/h (104 mph) (102 bhp)	188 km/h (117 mph) (Type 100B); 190 km/h (118 mph) (Type 100D)	217 km/h (135 mph) (Stage 4)
Acceleration 0–60 mph (0–97 km/h):	11.4 seconds (85 bhp); 11 seconds (90 bhp) — seconds (102 bhp)	— seconds (Type 100B); 9.1 seconds (Type 100D)	6.0 seconds (Stage 4)
Fuel consumption:	11.2 l/100 km (25 mpg_{‑imp}; 21 mpg_{‑US}) (90 bhp)	13.1 l/100 km (22 mpg_{‑imp}; 18 mpg_{‑US}) (Type 100D)	—

== Specials ==
=== AC Ace LM prototype ===
The AC Ace LM prototype was a one-off from the year 1958 with the unusual chassis number LM5000. It was designed by John Tojeiro on behalf of the brothers Hurlock specifically for the AC factory to field at the 24 Hours of Le Mans and other long-distance events.

The car weighed only 737 kilograms (1,625 lb), and differed fundamentally from the standard Ace: it had a lightweight tubular steel chassis without the massive ladder structure, a new double wishbone front suspension with coil-over-dampers, and a newly designed independent suspension at the rear. The open aluminium body was much lower, with large overhangs front and rear and a low nose and high tail for aerodynamics. The body was designed by artist Cavendish Morton, who also styled other sports cars. Both engine and transmission were from Bristol, with the engine being a Bristol Type 100D2/S unit.

After a test run on the Brooklands circuit just a few kilometres from the AC factory, the not-yet-fully-sorted prototype completed two events in 1958: as a factory entry in the Le Mans 24-hour race in June, and in the Rudac Racing Team at the RAC Tourist Trophy at the Goodwood Circuit in September. Due to changes in the regulations, the car was ineligible to compete in the next event in its class in the FIA - Sportscar World Championship. The Bristol drivetrain was returned to the manufacturer and the racing car was sold engineless. Later rebuilt, the Ace LM prototype was acquired by a collector.

=== AC Ace Bristol Zagato ===
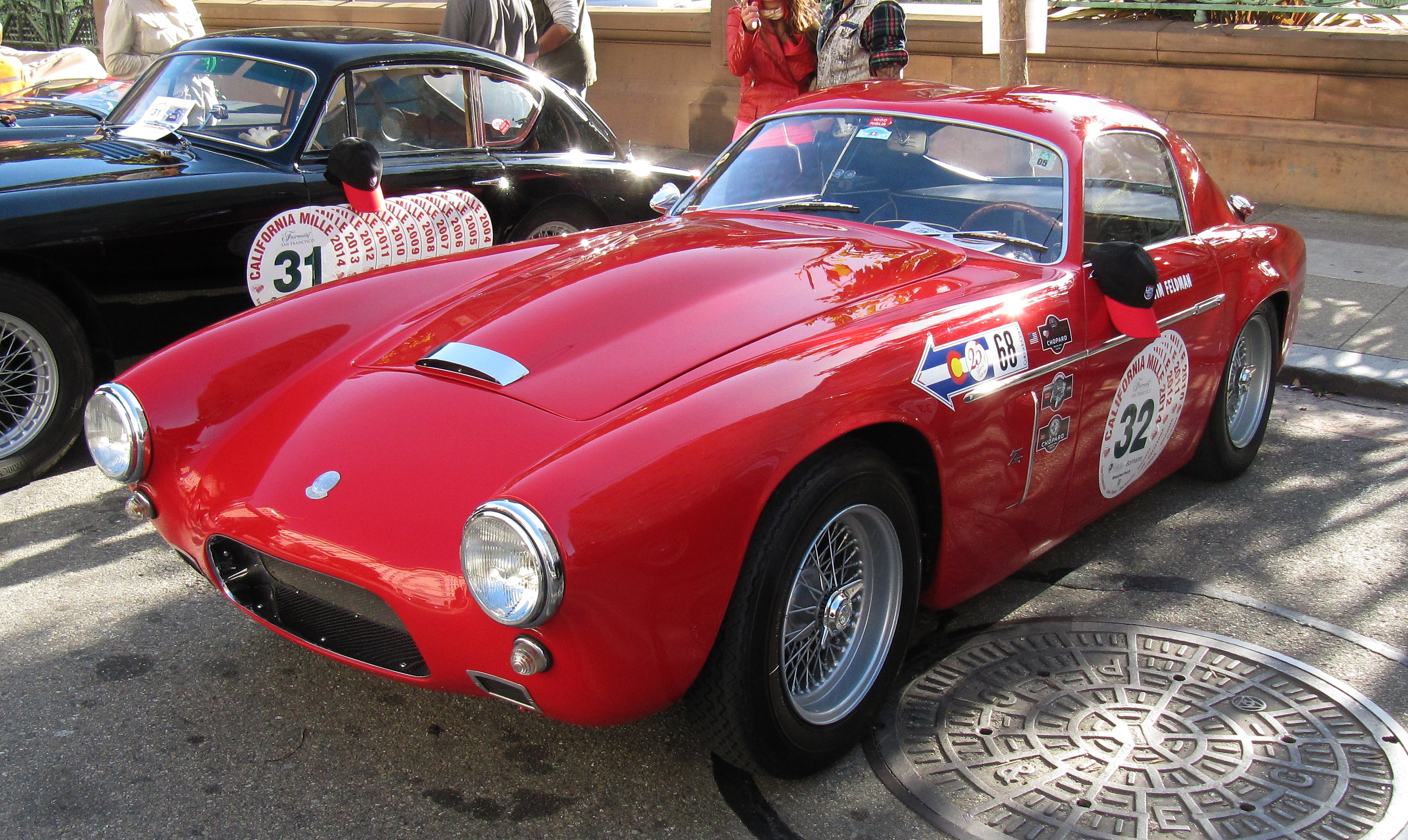
AC Ace Bristol Zagato

The "AC Ace Bristol Zagato" was designed and built by the carrozzeria Zagato in 1958. Built on Ace chassis number BEX 477, indicating a Bristol-powered export (left-hand drive) chassis, it was given a fixed-head coupé body like the AC Aceca.

The idea came about at the Geneva Motor Show in 1957 during a meeting between Hubert Patthey, the importer of AC and Aston Martin cars to Switzerland at the time, and Elio Zagato. Patthey commissioned Zagato to produce a unique body for the car, which would be used at local races and, in particular, at the Pescara rally. The donor 1957 Ace was delivered to the Swiss company in 1958.

Zagato produced a coupé body of thin aluminium sheet with their trademark "Double Bubble" roof, with vaults over the driver's and co-driver's seat to ensure sufficient headroom in the low coupé. The car took part in only one well-known race on 5 October 1958, at the Coupes du Salon, where it won its class of cars up to 2000 cc.

Patthey sold the finished coupé to John Gretener, an Englishman then living in Switzerland, who raced it in hill climbs around Lake Geneva. The car was repatriated to England, where it was owned by Kevin Jackson. Later, racing driver Jo Siffert acquired the car, which he used at different racing events and in historical races like the Mille Miglia. In 2000, American Jim Feldman acquired the AC Ace Bristol Zagato from the now-defunct Rosso Bianco collection, and personally restored the car.

The Ace Bristol Zagato is fitted with a Bristol six-cylinder engine that produces 130 hp (97 kW) at 5750 rpm, and 128 lb⋅ft (174 N⋅m) at 4500 rpm. The car is 3,848 millimetres (12.625 ft) long, 1,245 millimetres (4.085 ft) tall, and weights 862 kilograms (1,900 lb) ready-to-run. Its top speed is 185 kilometres per hour (115 mph). Acceleration 0–60 mph (0–97 km/h) takes 7.7 seconds, while 0–100 mph (0–161 km/h) takes 16.1 seconds.

=== AC Ace-Aigle ===
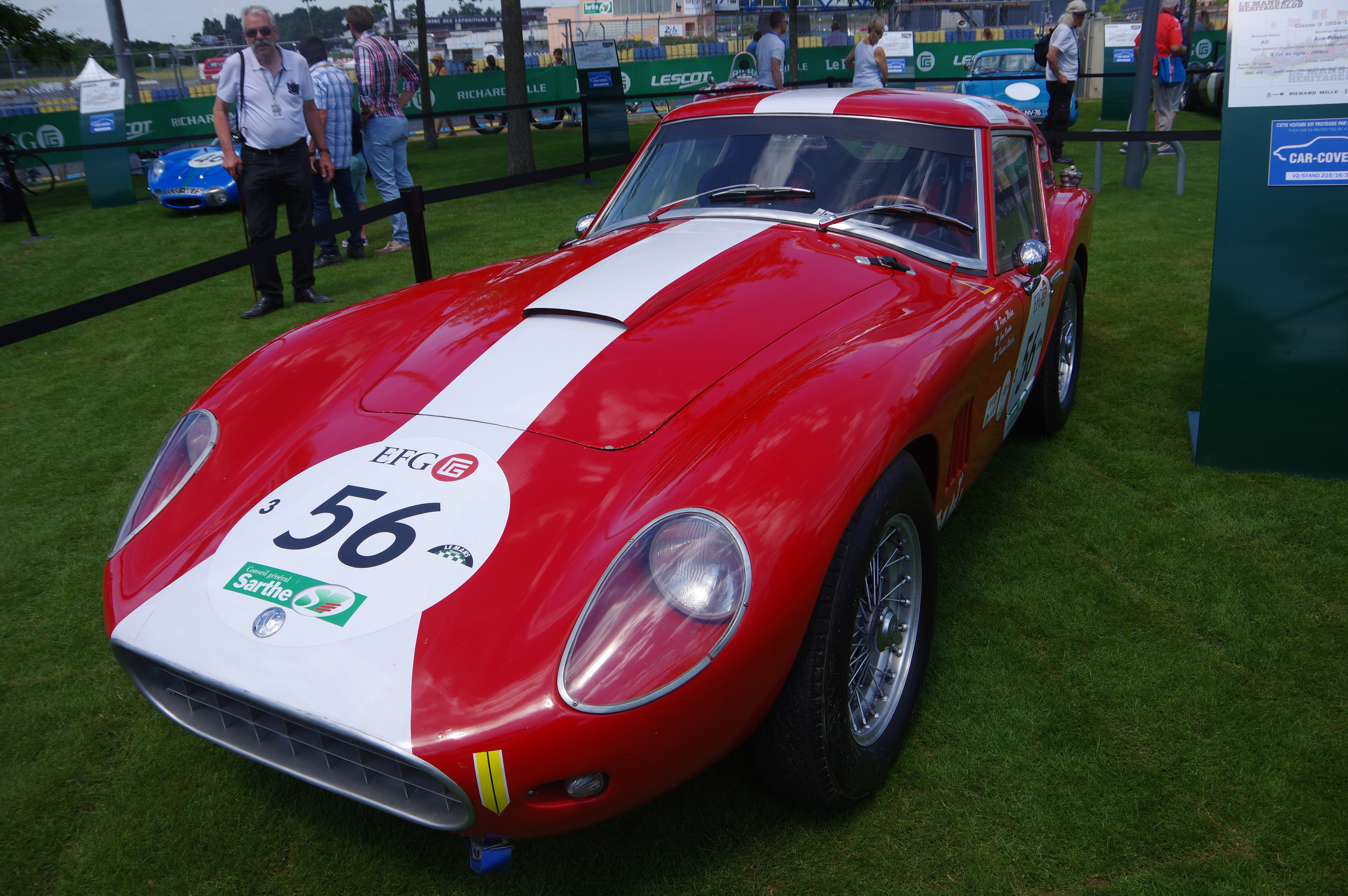
Rebodied Ace Bristol BEX 289

AC Ace-Aigle refers primarily to an AC Ace Bristol-based special built in Aigle, Switzerland on Ace chassis number BEX 289. At least one other AC Ace received similar modifications at a nearby location. Like the 1958 AC Ace Bristol Zagato, Swiss AC importer Hubert Patthey was involved with this car, but only in a minor way.

BEX 289 was the first AC Ace to leave the factory with front disc brakes. Patthey sold it to Charles Voegele, who used it as his personal car and entered it in some races. In 1959 it was damaged badly in a crash at la Col de la Faucille, after which it was resold by Patthey to brothers Claude and George Gachnang and brought to their workshop in Aigle as the basis for the Ace-Aigle.

Some suggest that the bodywork for the project was done by Carrozzeria Aigle, which until 1953 had been the Ghia-Aigle subsidiary of Carrozzeria Ghia. The carrozzeria had done similar work on a wide variety of cars, including a 1956 AC Aceca, but BEX 289 is not currently listed as a project on the Carrozzeria Aigle history site. Another source suggests that the work was done in the Gachnang's workshop with the assistance of an employee of the nearby Carrozzeria Grossman.

The Ace-Aigle received a modified nose and a fixed hardtop for improved aerodynamics. This roof included the "double bubble" design typical of Zagato as seen in its 1958 coupé. The factory front end of radiator grille, front wings and bonnet was replaced by a new one made of lightweight glass-reinforced plastic (GRP) that was longer, lower, and rounder than the original. The new nose had a flat, oval cooling air intake, and headlamps recessed into the wings with plexiglas covers. Underneath, the car received an all-new suspension.

In this form it was driven in the 1960 24 Hours of Le Mans by Georges Gachnang and André Wicky, with John Gretener as reserve, entered as Ecurie Lausannoise. It successfully completed the Le Mans test in April 1960, but was not classified in the June race due to insufficient distance covered. The Gachnang brothers formed Scuderia Cegga (for "Charles et Georges Gachnang, Aigle") in 1965.

BEX 289 was partially rebodied again in the 1970s and lost the double bubble in its roof, although who did the work is uncertain. One candidate is Piero Drogo's Carrozzeria Sports Cars.

After having lost track of BEX 289 for several years, the car was rediscovered in 2011, and was to appear at the Le Mans Classic 2012.

The AC Ace with chassis number BEX 429 was rebodied in a style very similar to BEX 289 by Ghia-Aigle for owner André Bungener, apparently without the Gachnangs' involvement. BEX 427 remained an open two seater.

=== AC Ace BEX 1192 ===
A modified "Ace Bristol" with chassis number BEX 1192 appeared in Le Mans in 1962, which was also the last Le Mans appearance of an "AC Ace" before the advent of the "AC Cobra" from 1964 on. The car of a French private owner, it was based on an Ace 2.6 chassis and received a special bodywork with faired-in headlights similar to BEX 289.

=== AC Ace-Jaguar ===
A car described as an "A.C. Ace-Jaguar" is listed as competing at the Weston-Super-Ware race and Brighton Speed Trials in the early 1960s. If the car was then powered by a Jaguar engine, it would have likely received some version of the Jaguar XK engine. In both of the cases above, the car was driven by an S. or S. H. Richardson. The latter name is associated with a company that was a car breaker and used-parts seller.

== Motorsport ==
AC Aces raced at Le Mans in 1957 and 1958. In the 1959 24 Hours of Le Mans, Ted Whiteaway and John Turner drove their AC Ace Bristol, registration 650BPK, to the finish, claiming top honours for the 2,000cc GT class and seventh overall behind six 3-litre cars.

== Replicas ==
As with the Cobra, some AC Ace replicas have been made, such as the Hawk Ace, but are much rarer.
