= Hubert Patthey =

Swiss auto importer and racing driver

- Born: November 19, 1919; Neuchâtel, Switzerland
- Died: November 30, 2009 (aged 90); Neuchâtel, Switzerland
- Occupations: Automobile importer Racing driver

Hubert Patthey (19 November 1919, Neuchâtel, Switzerland – 30 November 2009, Neuchâtel, Switzerland) was a Swiss racing driver, automobile importer, and automobile club official.

== Automotive business ==
After World War II, Patthey began importing French and British sports cars to Switzerland. Among the first cars Patthey imported was the British Jowett Jupiter, and he was the first to bring the German Porsche 356 into Switzerland. For many years, he sold Alpine, AC, Alvis, HRG, and Aston Martin vehicles from Garage Hubert Patthey (previously Garage Patthey & Fils) in Neuchâtel.

During his association with AC Cars, Patthey influenced some of the company's offerings. His suggestion that AC add a four-seater coupé to the lineup was one reason that the AC Greyhound was developed. He put the Hurlock brothers in touch with Pietro Frua when AC was looking for a carrozzeria to partner with in producing what became the AC 428.

Patthey placed an order with AC Cars for an AC Cobra which he planned to display at the 1964 Geneva International Motor Show. When AC informed him that they would be unable to deliver a car in time, Patthey contacted Carroll Shelby directly and explained the situation. Shelby arranged for AC to supply a car that had been meant for export to the United States. The car that Patthey received had parts labelled with a mixture of the English chassis number "COX 6012", and the number "2354", short for the car's US designation of CSX2354.

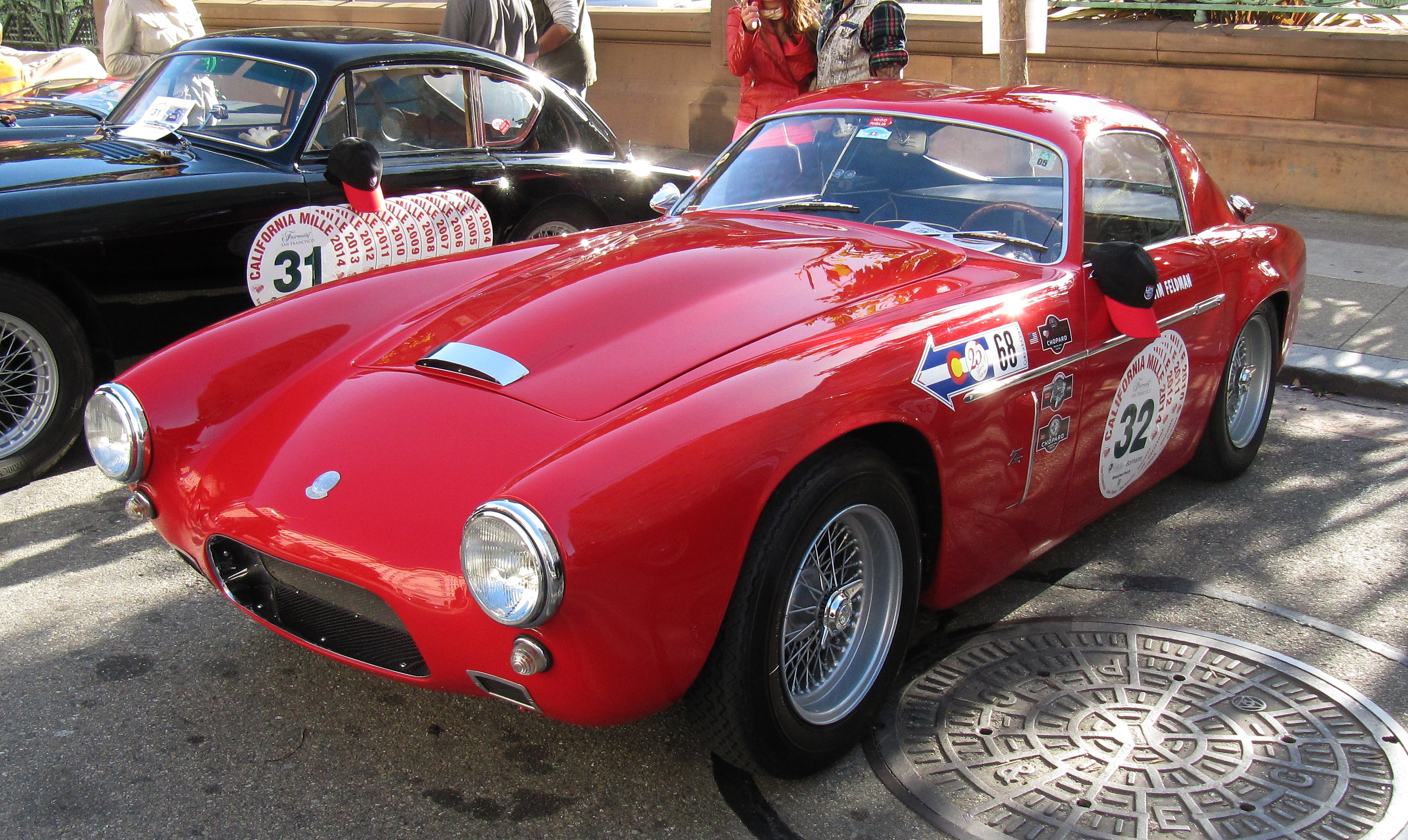
AC Ace Bristol Zagato

Patthey was also involved with the creation of at least two AC cars customised in Switzerland. He first sold BEX 289 to Charles Voegele, who used it both as a personal car and for racing. After being badly damaged in an accident, the car was resold by Patthey to brothers Claude and George Gachnang, who used it as the basis for the rebodied AC Ace-Aigle. Additionally, Patthey personally commissioned Carrozzeria Zagato to build the AC Ace Bristol Zagato.

Over the course of several years in the early 1960s Patthey bought a small number of open-wheeled Formula Junior race cars from the Cooper Car Company.

== Motorsports ==
In 1947, Hubert Patthey won a sportscar race in Lausanne in an MG TC

In 1946, Patthey began racing in hillclimbs, then later added circuit racing, appearing at events in Switzerland and elsewhere.

In 1947, Patthey won a sports car race in Lausanne in a supercharged MG TC. In 1948 he drove a supercharged TC at the Brighton Speed Trials, where he won his class and set a new speed record. In 1949 he returned to Lausanne in the eponymously-named "HP Special", and the same year did one event driving an HRG. He drove Porsche 356es in various sportscar events in the early 1950s, including at Silverstone Circuit and the Nürburgring.

Patthey made frequent appearances at the Monte Carlo rally. He was an entrant in 1952, but did not finish. From 1953 to 1955 he completed the race driving various versions of Porsche 356. In 1956 he drove a Volkswagen Beetle to claim the Replica and Coupe Acropole awards. In 1960 he drove a Simca Aronde but did not finish, and in 1962 completed the race driving an Mini Cooper. He also competed in other rallys.

In some events Patthey is listed as the sponsor of the car, with other drivers taking the wheel.

In 1955, Patthey partnered with Maurice Scemama and Charles Renaud to establish l'Écurie des 3 Chevrons. This racing team is open to all French-speaking Swiss citizens, with Patthey himself racing under the team's name in some events. As of October 2025, the team is still active.

Patthey was the original owner of the 1956 AC Ace with chassis number BEX 168. Upon receipt of the car, he immediately took it racing. Patthay drove an AC Ace in the 1956 Grand Prix de Suisse de la Montagne Ollon-Villars, where he won the Group IV class.

Patthey appeared twice in the 24 Hours of Le Mans. In 1958, he and partner Georges Berger finished ninth overall in the AC Ace with chassis number BEX399. In 1959, he retired early due to an engine failure in his Aston Martin DB4 GT.

== Race results ==
=== Complete 24 Hours of Le Mans results ===
Year	Team	Co-drivers	Car	Class	Laps	Pos.	Class pos.
1958	(United Kingdom) AC Cars Ltd.	(Belgium) Georges Berger	AC Ace	S2.0	255	9th	**3rd**
1959	(Switzerland) Écurie des 3 Chevrons	(Switzerland) Renaud Calderari	Aston Martin DB4 GT	GT3.0	21	DNF (Engine)	

=== Complete World Sportscar Championship results ===
(key) (Races in bold indicate pole position) (Races in italics indicate fastest lap)

Year	Team	Car	1	2	3	4	5	6	DC	Points
1958	(United Kingdom) AC Cars Ltd.	AC Ace	BUE	SEB	TAR	NUR	LMS; 9	RAC	NC	0
1959	(Switzerland) Écurie des 3 Chevrons	Aston Martin DB4	SEB	TAR	NUR	LMS; Ret	RAC		NC	0

== Personal life ==
Patthey's father was a mechanic, which gave him an early exposure to all things mechanical.

Patthey had his private pilot license. He was married and the father of two daughters and a son.

He was an official of the Automobile Club of Switzerland (ACS) for many years, and from 1974 to 1986 he was president of the Neuchâtel branch of the ACS.
