= AC Greyhound =

British automobile

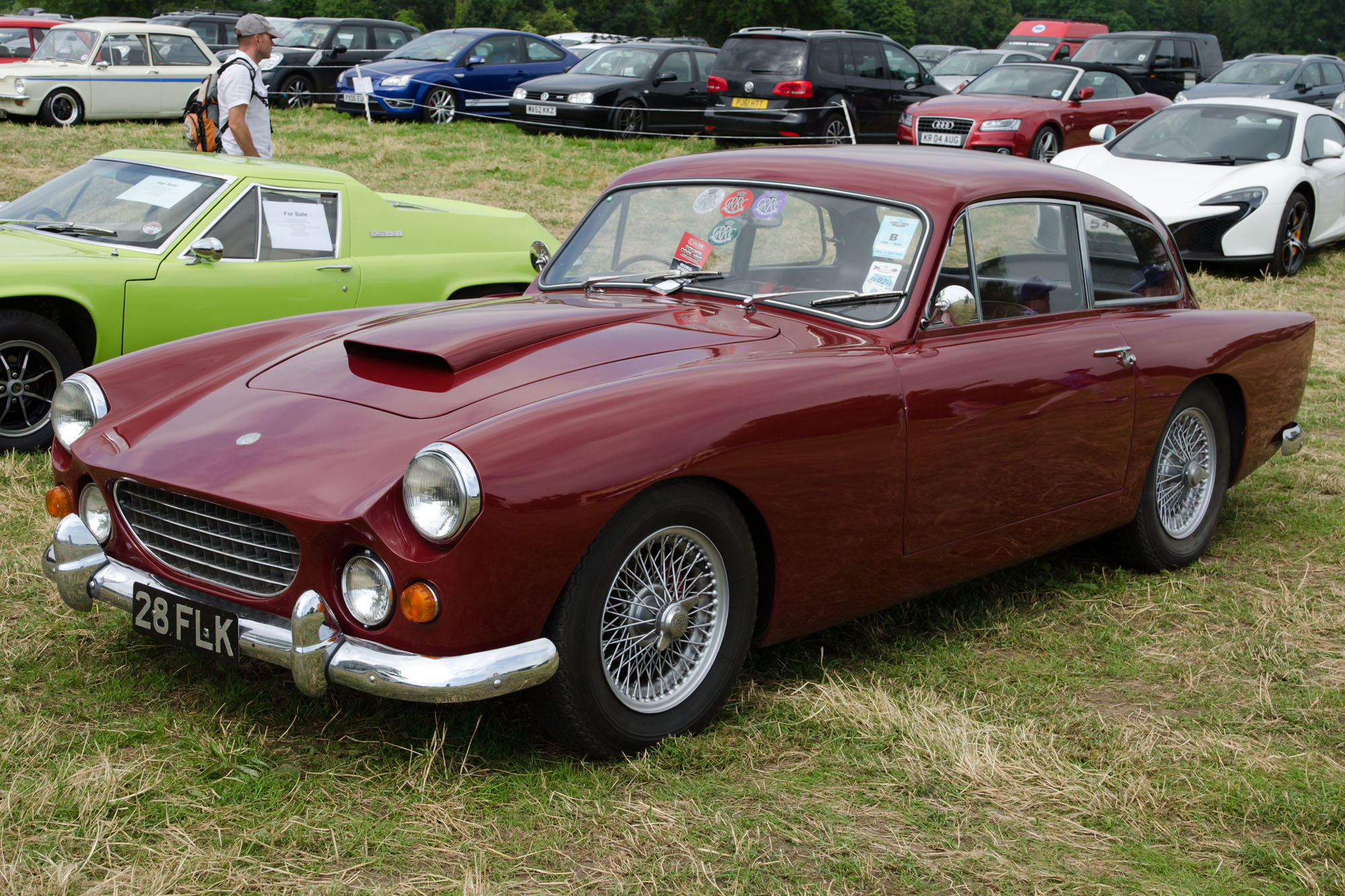
- 1963 AC Greyhound 2.6

Overview
- Manufacturer: AC Cars
- Production: 1959–1963; 83 made

Body and chassis
- Class: Grand tourer

Powertrain
- Engine: 2.0/2.2/2.6 litre I6
- Transmission: 4-speed manual

Dimensions
- Wheelbase: 100 in (2,540 mm)
- Length: 175 in (4,445 mm)
- Width: 65.5 in (1,664 mm)
- Height: 53 in (1,346 mm)
- Curb weight: 2,240 lb (1,020 kg)

The AC Greyhound (1959–1963) is a 2+2 grand touring automobile made by AC Cars of Thames Ditton, Surrey, England. It was announced for the opening of the Motor Show in October 1959. 83 examples were built.

== Features ==
The Greyhound has a two-door, four-seater aluminium body. It inherited most of its technical components from AC's Ace and Aceca automobiles, but with a 10-inch (254 mm) longer wheelbase, and coil springs instead of a transverse leaf spring at the front. Other features include:

- ladder-frame chassis
- independent coil spring suspension front and rear. Unlike the Ace and Aceca the rear suspension used semi-trailing arms.
- 4-speed manual gearbox, overdrive optional
- rack and pinion steering;
- 11.75 in (298 mm) disc brake front, 11 in (279 mm) drum brake rear

Various straight-six engines were fitted:

- 2.0 L (1,991 cc) AC Light Six OHC (75 bhp at 4500 rpm; 1000 kg)
- 2.0 L (1,971 cc) Bristol 100D2 OHV, (125 bhp at 5750 rpm; 1015 kg)
- 2.2 L (2,216 cc) Bristol (105 bhp at 4700 rpm; 1093 kg)
- 2.6 L (2,553 cc) Ford Zephyr engine (up to 170 bhp at 5500 rpm; 1040 kg)

== Performance ==
A 2-litre Bristol-engined car with overdrive tested by The Motor magazine in 1961 had a top speed of 110 mph (180 km/h) and could accelerate from 0–60 mph (97 km/h) in 11.4 seconds. Fuel consumption of 21.8 miles per imperial gallon (13.0 L/100 km; 18.2 mpg_{‑US}) was recorded. The test car cost £3185 including taxes.

== Gallery ==
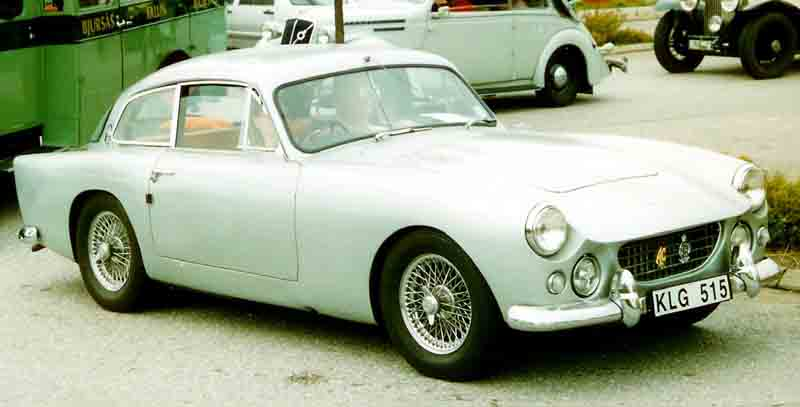
1962 AC Greyhound

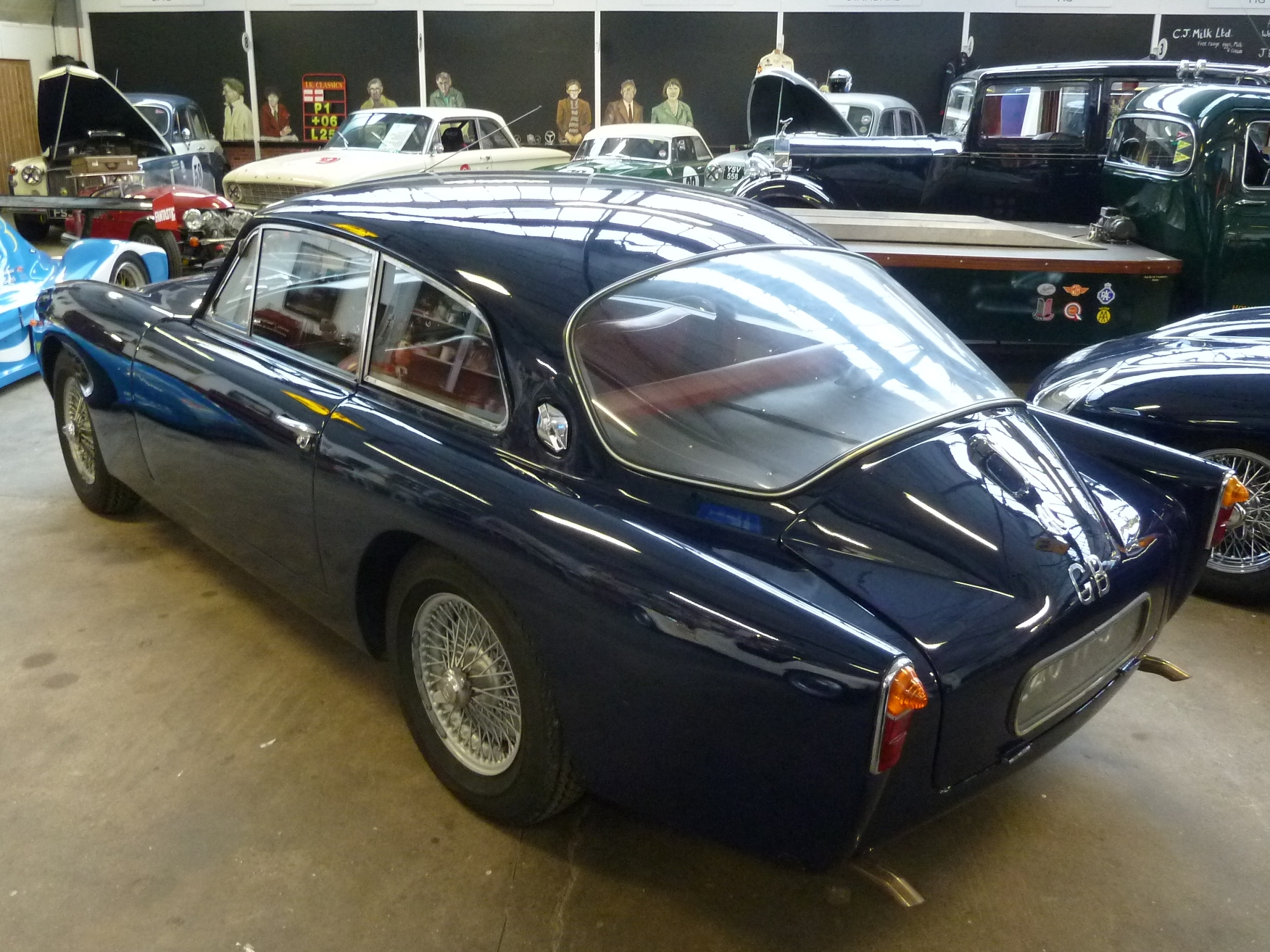
1962 AC Greyhound rear

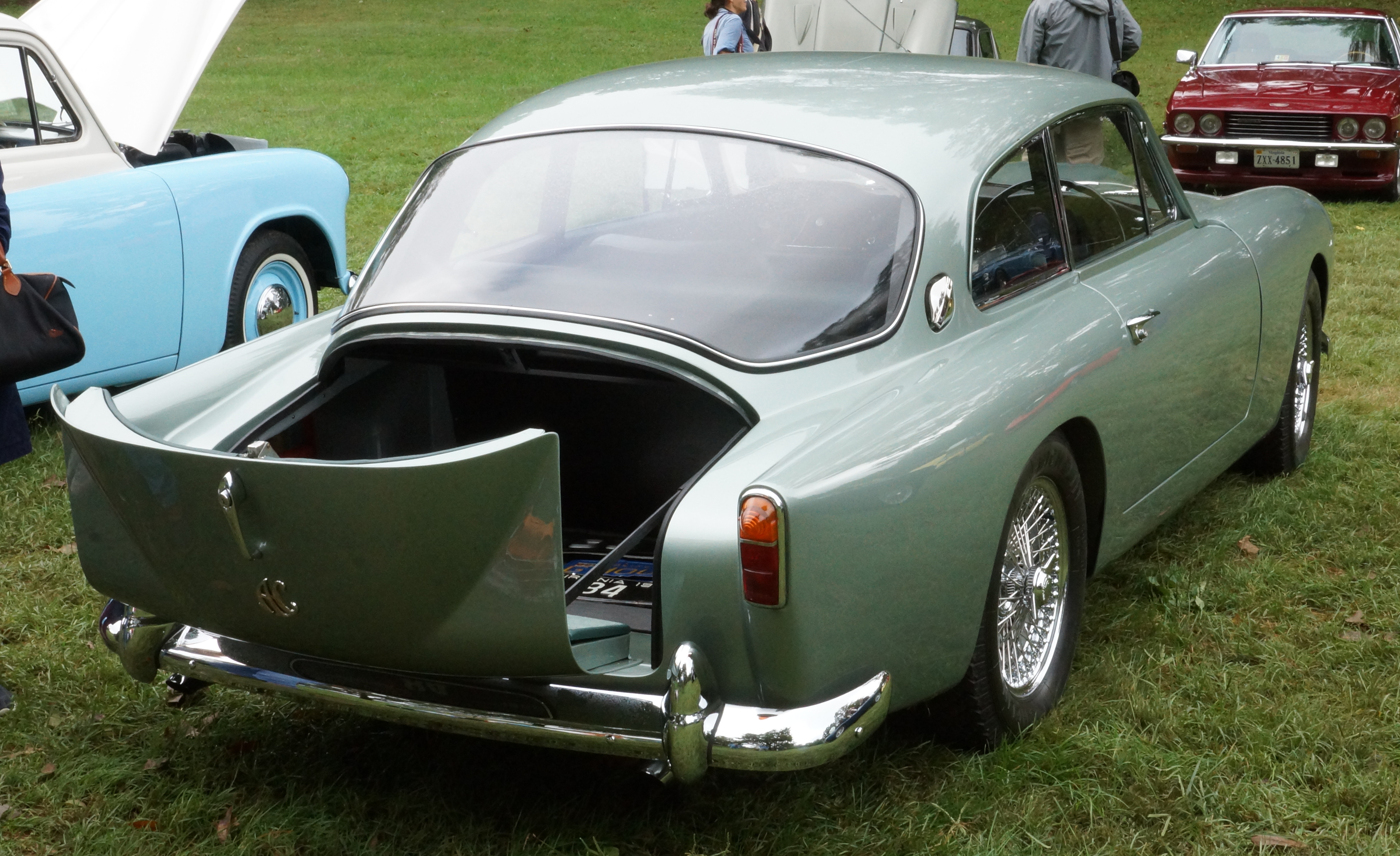
Greyhound with the boot open
