= Ford Zephyr engine =

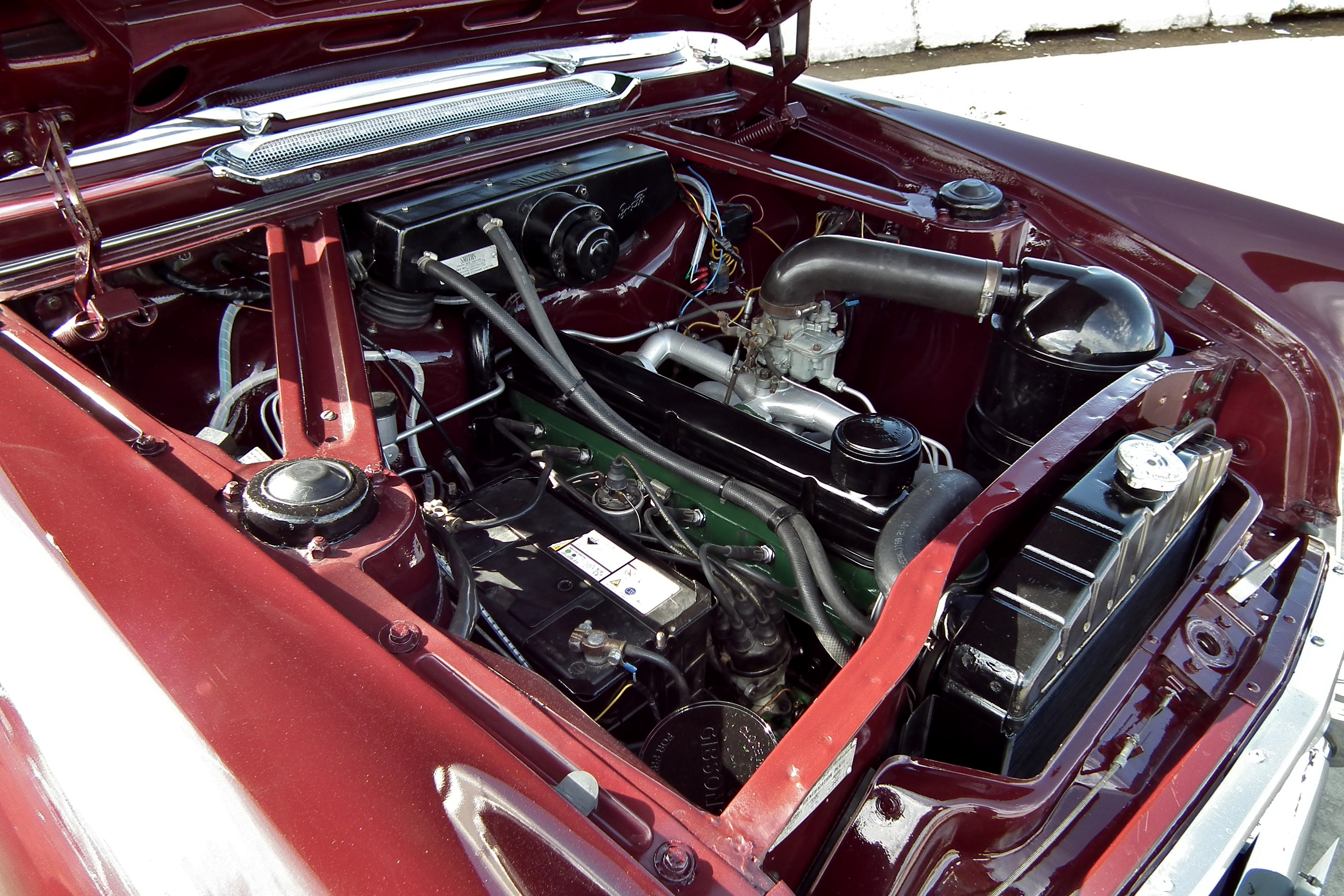

Overview
- Manufacturer: Ford Motor Company
- Production: 1951-1966

Layout
- Configuration: Straight-4 and straight-6
- Displacement: 1,508–2,553 cc (92.0–155.8 cu in)
- Cylinder bore: 79.37 mm (3.12 in); 82.55 mm (3.25 in)
- Piston stroke: 76.2 mm (3.00 in); 79.5 mm (3.13 in)
- Valvetrain: OHV

Combustion
- Fuel type: Petrol
- Cooling system: Water-cooled

Output
- Power output: 47–71 bhp (35–53 kW)

Chronology
- Successor: Essex V4, Essex V6

The Ford Zephyr engine was a line of automotive OHV internal combustion engines that were designed for and unveiled with Ford of Britain's Zephyr/Zodiac and Consul models. The family included both straight-four and straight-six versions. Production began in 1951 and lasted until 1966, when it was replaced by Ford's Essex V4 and Essex V6 engines.

== Consul/Zephyr 4 ==
The four cylinder debuted in the Consul as a 1.5-litre engine. Bore and stroke are 79.37 mm × 76.2 mm (3.12 in × 3.00 in) for a total displacement of 1,508 cc (92.0 cu in). With its standard compression ratio of 6.8:1 it produces 47 bhp (35 kW) at 4400 rpm. It was enlarged in 1956 to 1,702 cc (103.9 cu in) for the Mark II Consul by increasing both the bore and stroke to 82.55 mm × 79.5 mm (3.25 in × 3.13 in), raising power to 59 bhp (44 kW). This engine continued in the Mark III car, which dropped the Consul name and was now called the Zephyr 4.

=== Applications ===
- Allard Palm Beach
- Buckler DD2
- Ford Consul
- Ford Zephyr 4
- Paramount Ten
- Reliant Sabre

== Zephyr 6 ==
The six-cylinder Zephyr engine was used widely. Displacement was 2,262 cc (138.0 cu in) in early versions that had the same bore and stroke as the 1.5-litre 4-cylinder. It was produced with two available compression ratios: 6.8:1 in the Zephyr, with an output of 68 bhp (51 kW), and 7.5:1 in the top-of-range Zodiac, with an output of 71 bhp (53 kW). The six-cylinder grew to 2,553 cc (155.8 cu in) in the 1956 Mark II when its bore and stroke were increased to match the 1.7-litre inline four.

=== Applications ===
- AC Ace and Aceca
- AC Greyhound
- Allard Palm Beach
- Britannia GT
- Buckle Sports Coupe
- Fairthorpe Zeta
- Ford Zephyr and Zodiac
- Lea-Francis Lynx
- Reliant Sabre
- Reliant Scimitar

== See also ==
- List of Ford engines
