= Grand Tourer Injection =

Car model variant

A Grand Tourer Injection (from Italian: Gran Turismo Iniezione) - abbreviated to GTI or GTi - is a fuel-injection car model variant. Traditionally used for grand tourer cars, the term is now applied to various hot hatchbacks, even though they do not have the luxury traditionally associated with grand tourers.

The 1961 Maserati 3500 GTi was the first car to use the GTI name that was later made famous in 1976 with the Volkswagen Golf GTI and also by the Peugeot 205 GTi launched in 1984.

== Examples ==
GTI models include:

- Audi Fox GTi B1 (North America)
- Chevrolet Aveo GTi T200/250 (Colombia)
- Citroën AX GTI
- Citroën BX GTI
- Citroën CX GTI
- Citroën Visa GTI
- Dacia Nova GTI
- Daewoo Racer GTI
- Daihatsu Charade GTI G201 (Europe)
- Ferrari 400 GTi
- Ford Escort GTi Mk6 (Europe)
- Honda Civic GTI EF/EG (New Zealand)
- Isuzu Gemini GTI 16V JT190 (Europe)
- Lada 110/111/112 GTi
- Lada Kalina GTi (prototype)
- Maserati 3500 GTI
- Maserati Sebring 3500/3700/4000 GTI
- Mazda 323 GTi BF/BG (Finland/United Kingdom)
- Mazda 323F GTI (The Netherlands)
- Mazda 626 GTi GD (Finland/United Kingdom)
- Mitsubishi Eterna/Galant GTI-16V E33A (Asia/Europe/Indonesia)
- Mitsubishi Lancer GTI-16V C53A/C58A/CB5A (Asia)
- Mitsubishi Colt GTI-16V/GTi-S C53A/C58A/CB5A (Europe)
- Nissan 100NX GTI (Europe)
- Nissan Almera GTi N15 (Europe)
- Nissan Bluebird Turbo GTi T12/72 (Europe)
- Nissan Cherry GTi N12 (Europe)
- Nissan Pulsar/Sunny GTi/GTiR N13/14 (Japan/Australia/Europe)
- Peugeot 106 GTI
- Peugeot 205 GTI
- Peugeot 206 GTI
- Peugeot 207 GTI
- Peugeot 208 GTI
- Peugeot 306 GTI
- Peugeot 308 GTI
- Peugeot 309 GTI\GTI16
- Peugeot 505 GTI
- Proton Satria GTi
- Rover 216/220 GTi
- Rover 25 GTi
- Rover 416 GTi
- Rover Metro/114 GTi
- SEAT Ibiza GTI Mk2
- SEAT Toledo GTI Mk1
- Suzuki Cultus/Forsa/Swift GTi Mk1/2
- Toyota Carina E GTi (Europe)
- Toyota Celica GT-i16 ST162/182 (Europe)
- Toyota Corolla GTi AE92 (Asia/Australia/Europe)
- Toyota Corolla Coupé GTi AE86 (Austria/Switzerland)
- Volkswagen Gol/Pointer (Mk2)/Parati GTi (Latin America)
- Volkswagen Golf GTI
- Volkswagen Lupo GTI
- Volkswagen Passat GTi B1 (prototype)
- Volkswagen Pointer GTi Mk1 (Latin America)
- Volkswagen Polo GTI
- Volkswagen Rabbit GTI (United States/Canada)
- Volkswagen Scirocco GTi Mk1/2
- Volkswagen up! GTI
