= Maserati 3500 GT =

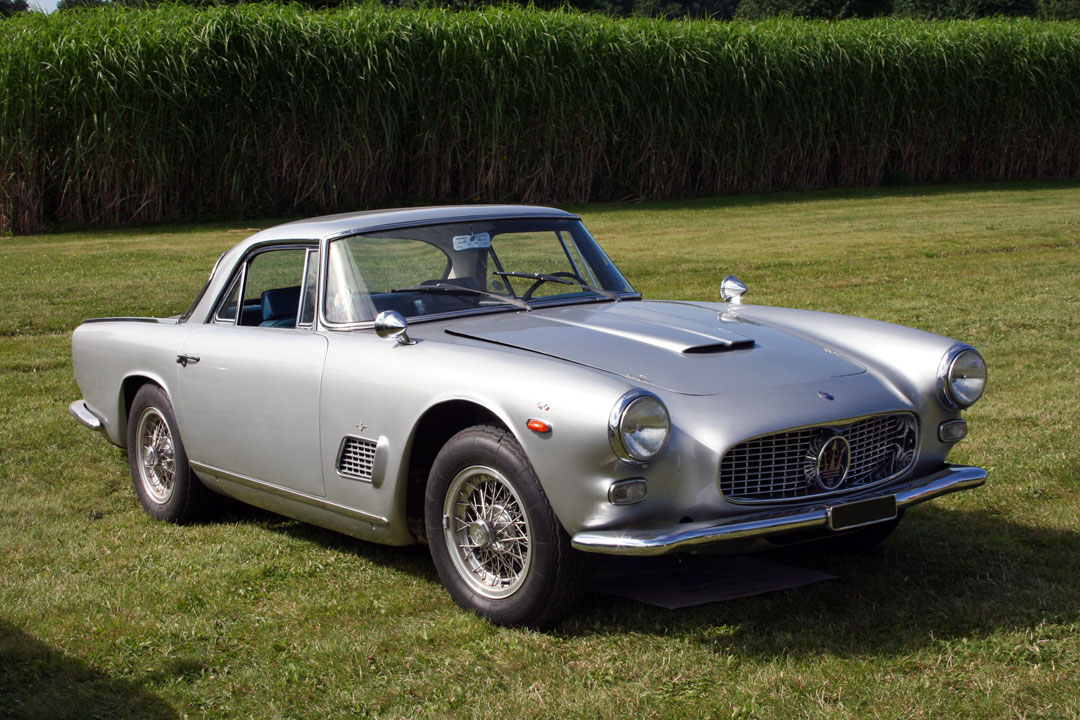

Overview
- Manufacturer: Maserati
- Production: 1957–1964; 2,226 produced
- Assembly: Italy: Modena
- Designer: Carrozzeria Touring (coupé); Giovanni Michelotti at Vignale (spyder)

Body and chassis
- Class: Grand tourer
- Body style: 2+2 coupé 2-seat spyder
- Layout: Front-engine, rear-wheel-drive
- Related: Maserati Sebring

Powertrain
- Engine: 3.5 L Tipo 101 I6
- Transmission: 4-speed ZF S4-17 manual 5-speed ZF S5-17 manual

Dimensions
- Wheelbase: 2,600 mm (102.4 in) (coupé); 2,500 mm (98.4 in) (spyder)
- Length: 4,780 mm (188.2 in) (coupé); 4,450 mm (175.2 in) (spyder)
- Width: 1,760 mm (69.3 in) (coupé); 1,635 mm (64.4 in) (spyder)
- Kerb weight: 1,440 kg (3,175 lb)

Chronology
- Predecessor: Maserati A6
- Successor: Maserati Sebring; Maserati Mistral (Tipo AM109)

The Maserati 3500 GT (Tipo 101) and the Maserati 3500 GT Spyder (Tipo 101/C) are 2-door coupé and convertible grand tourers made by Italian car manufacturer Maserati between 1957 and 1964. It was a seminal vehicle for Maserati as the company's first successful attempt at the Gran Turismo market and series production.

== History ==
=== Background ===
In the early 1950s Maserati had achieved racing success and international visibility, thanks to cars such as the A6GCM; its 2-litre, twin cam inline-six engine had already been enlarged to three litre capacity on the Maserati 300S. Chief engineer Giulio Alfieri felt the next step was to design an all-new 3.5-litre engine; the resulting long-stroke six, designed foremost for endurance racing on the Maserati 350S, was ready in 1955. In the meantime Maserati's first forays into the grand tourer market, the 1947 A6 1500, 1951 A6G 2000 and 1954 A6G/54, had proven that the business was feasible; but the A6 road cars were still built in just a dozen examples a year—hardly series production. A different approach was needed to build fully accomplished grand tourers.

=== Development ===
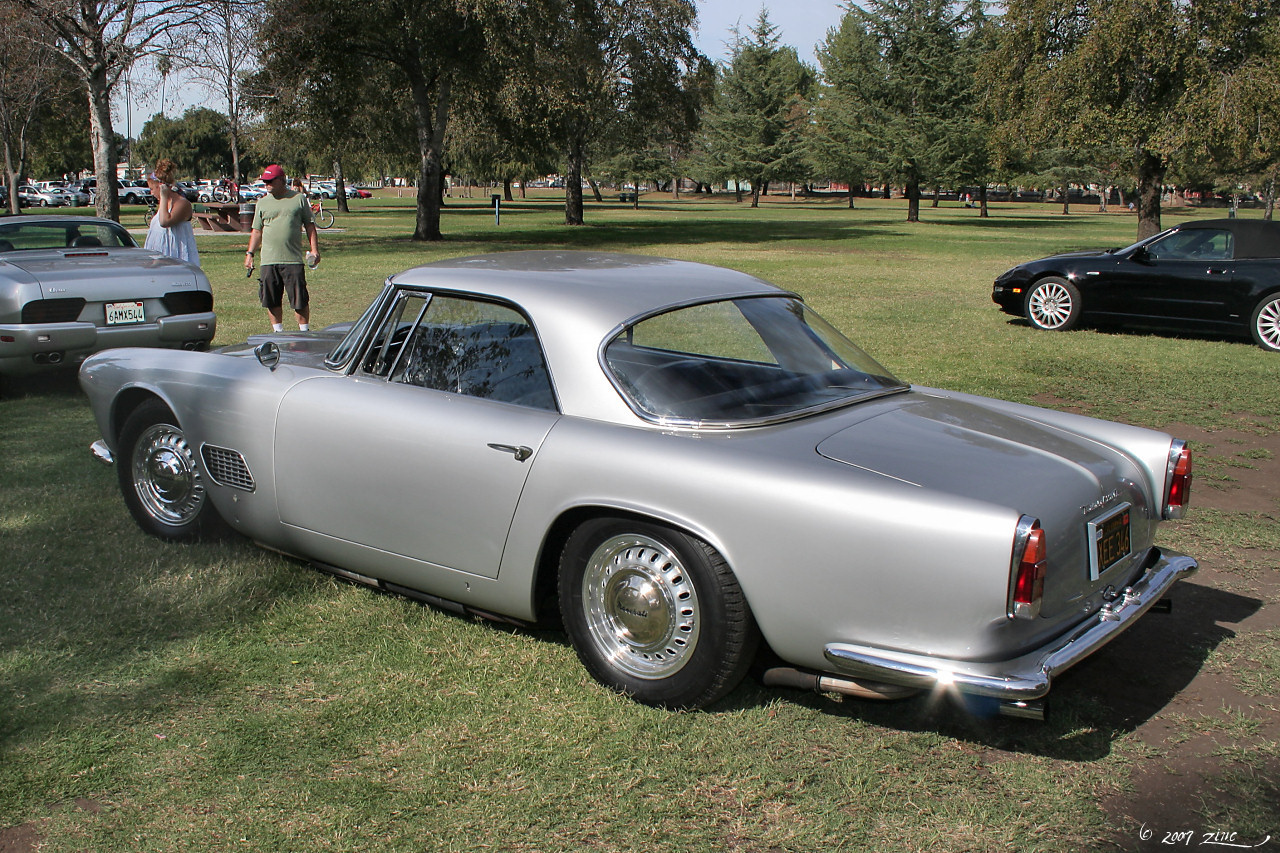
1961 Maserati 3500 GT; rear 3/4 view

The main development efforts that led to the 3500 GT were carried out in 1956–57, despite the frantic activity required by Maserati's participation in the Formula 1 world championship. Alfieri modified the 350S's engine to suit a touring car, e.g. by switching to a wet sump oil system and changing the engine accessories. He also made several business trips to the United Kingdom in order to contact components suppliers. None were found in Italy, as Italian taxation system and the industry structure forced manufacturers to design every part in-house; a daunting task for small companies like Maserati. Thus the 3500 GT alongside Italian Weber carburettors and Marelli ignition, used many British-made components such as a Salisbury rear axle, Girling brakes and Alford & Alder suspension parts.

Next came the bodywork. According to Carrozzeria Touring's Carlo Felice Bianchi Anderloni it was Commendatore Franco Cornacchia, a prominent Ferrari dealer, that put in contact Maserati owner Omar Orsi with the Milanese Carrozzeria. The first 3500 GT Touring prototype had a 2+2 body, with superleggera construction and was white in colour; it was nicknamed Dama Bianca (White Lady). Two 3500 GT prototypes were shown at the March 1957 Salon International de l'Auto in Geneva. Both had a 2,600 mm (102.4 in) wheelbase, 6.50-16 Pirelli Stella Bianca tyres and aluminium bodywork; they were Touring's Dama Bianca, and another one by Carrozzeria Allemano. Touring's proposal was chosen for series production with few changes; the chief revision was a more imposing grille.

=== Into production ===
Production of the 3500 GT started in late 1957; eighteen cars were built that year, the first handful leaving the factory before Christmas. All 3500 GTs had leather interior and Jaeger instruments. A first Touring convertible prototype was shown at the 1958 Turin Motor Show. But it was a proposal by Carrozzeria Vignale (designed by Michelotti) shown at the 1959 Salon de l'Auto in Paris that went into production as 3500 GT Spyder. The Spyder did not feature Touring's Superleggera construction, but rather a steel body with aluminium bonnet, boot lid and optional hard top; it was also built on a 10 cm (3.9 in) shorter wheelbase, and weighed 1,380 kg (3,042 lb). Front disc brakes and limited slip differential became optional in 1959, and were standardized in 1960; rear discs became standard in 1962.

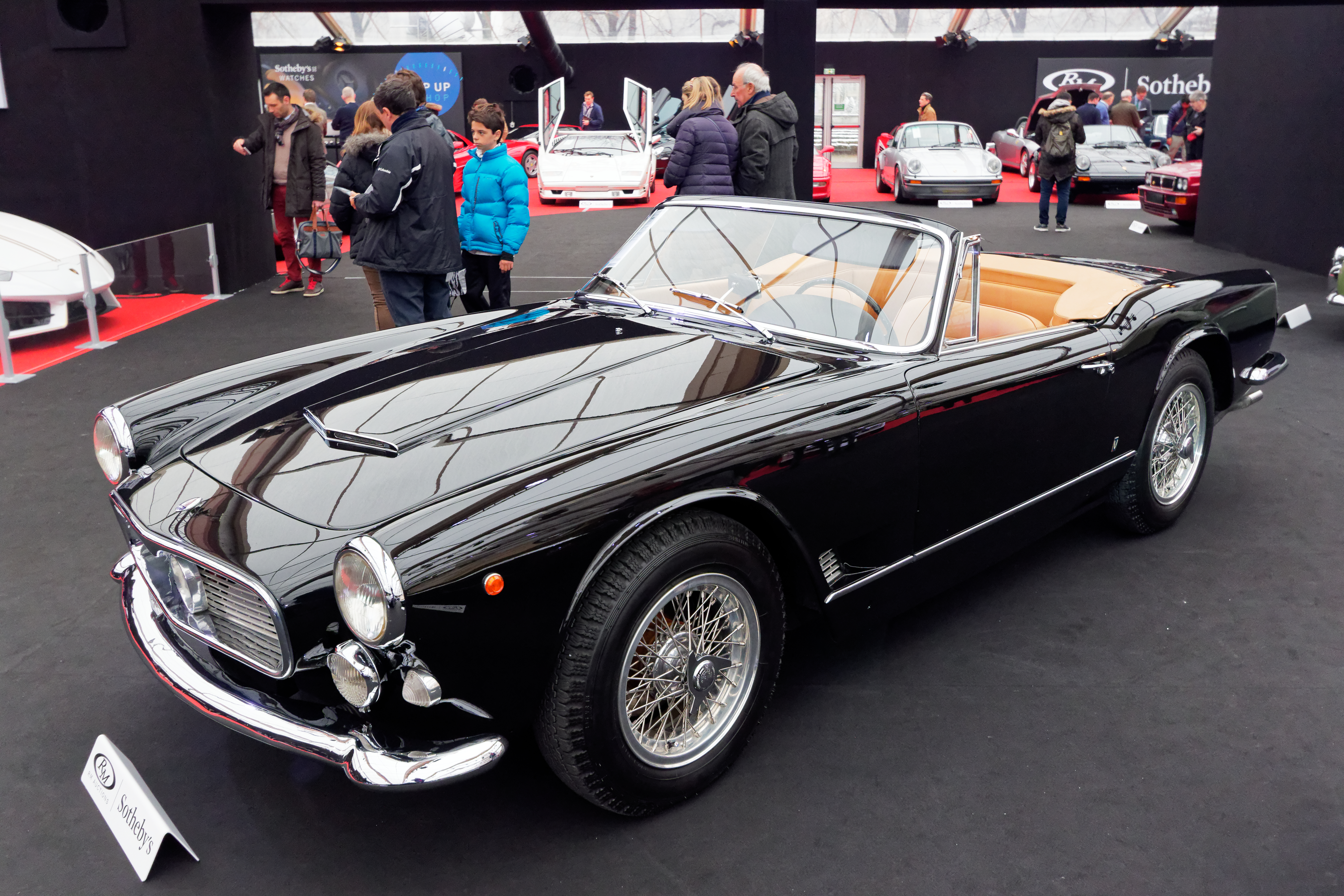
The 3500 GT Spyder by Carrozzeria Vignale

The 3500 GTi was introduced at the 1960 Salon International de l'Auto, and by the following year became the first fuel-injected Italian production car. It had a Lucas mechanical fuel injection, and developed 235 PS (173 kW; 232 bhp). The 5-speed gearbox which had been an available option since 1960 was made standard. The body had a lowered roofline and became somewhat longer; minor outward changes appeared as well (new grille, rear lights, radial 185VR16 Pirelli Cinturato tyres, vent windows). From 1961 convertible 3500s for export markets were named 3500 GT Spyder and GTi Spyder.

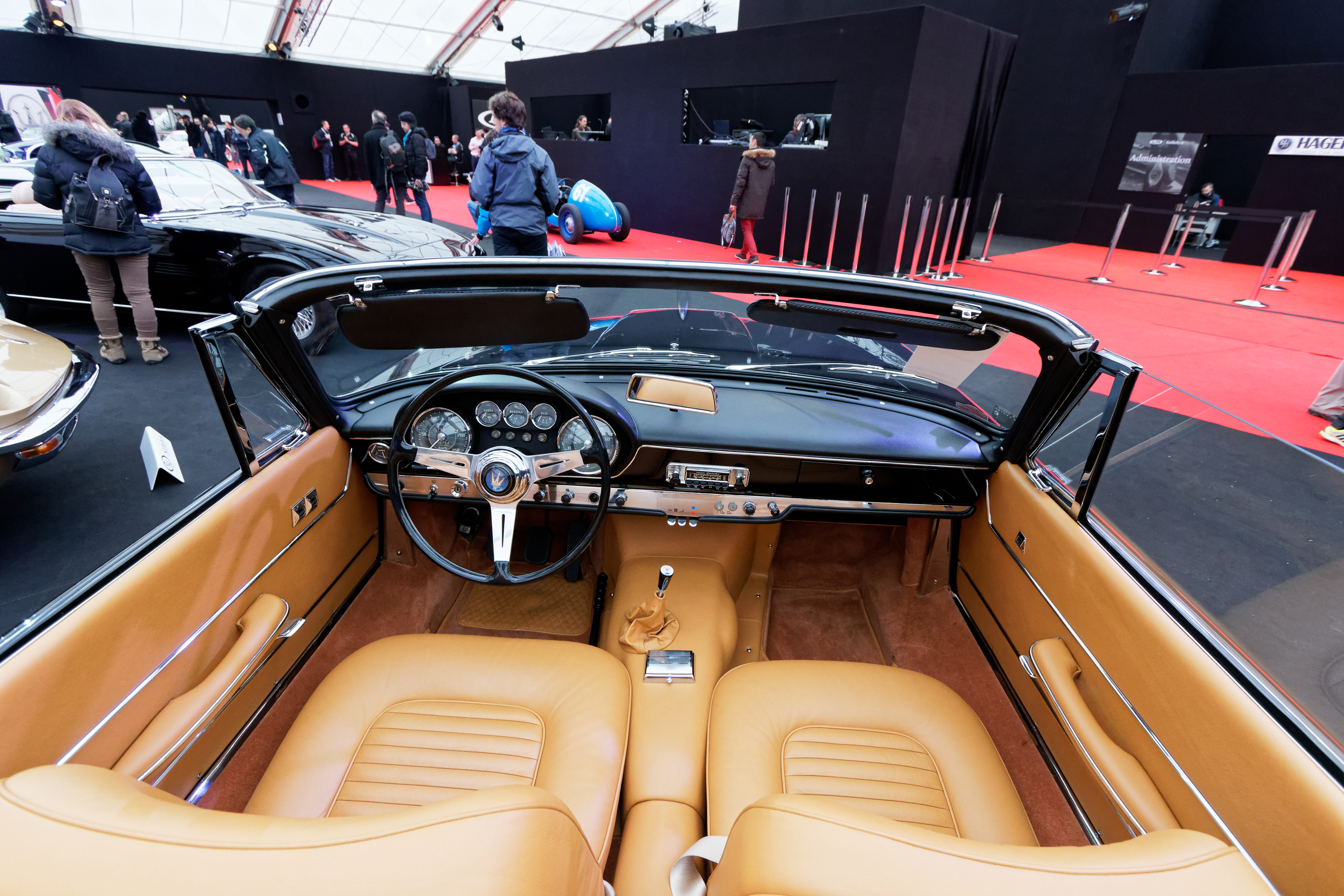
3500 GT Spyder interior

In 1959, the V8-engined Maserati 5000 GT was introduced using the chassis of the 3500 GT. Also based on the 3500 GT's mechanicals was the Maserati Sebring 2+2 coupé, which entered production in 1962.

In total 2,226 3500 GT coupés and convertibles were built between 1957 and 1964. The first year (1958) 119 cars were sold, while 1961 was the best-selling year, totalling 500. All together, 245 Vignale convertibles and nearly 2000 coupés were manufactured, of these, 1981 being Touring coupés, the rest were bodied by other coachbuilders: Carrozzeria Allemano (four coupés, including the 1957 prototype), Carrozzeria Boneschi (coupé designed by Rodolfo Bonetto, 1962 Turin Motor Show and 1963 Geneva Motor Show), Pietro Frua (two or three coupés, one spider) and Bertone (one coupé designed by Franco Scaglione, 1959 Turin Motor Show). The last was a coupé by Moretti (1966 Geneva Motor Show). In 1957 Zagato proposed a coupé in style reminiscent of their rebodied A6G/54 Coupé Speciale, but no cars were built.

== Specifications ==
=== Frame and chassis ===
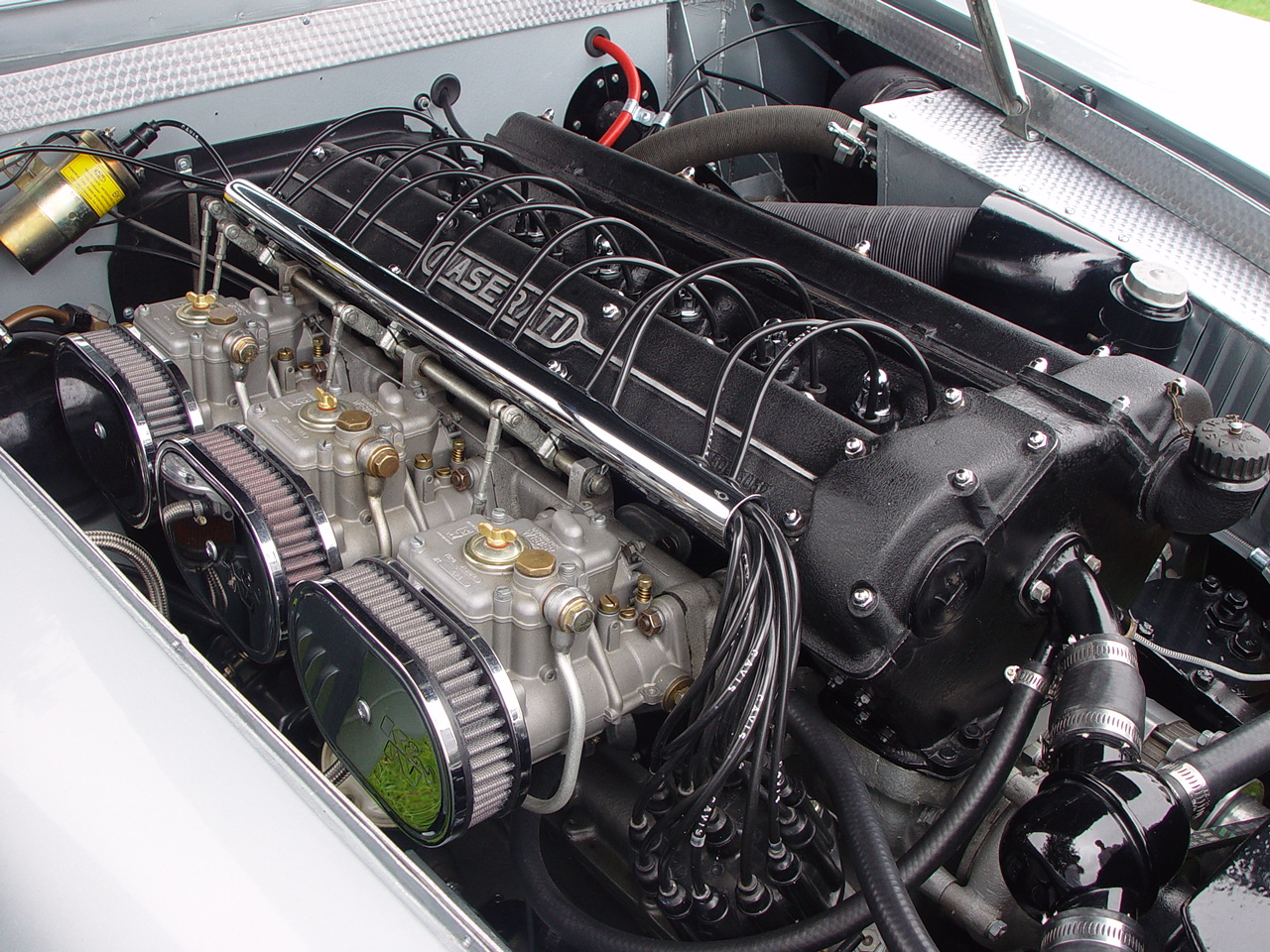
View of the engine of a 3500 GT

The 3500 GT was built on a tube platform chassis, constructed from tubes of square, round or elliptic section of Superleggera construction. Front suspension was by double wishbones coil springs, hydraulic dampers and an anti-roll bar; at the rear there was a Salisbury solid axle on semi-elliptic leaf springs, with hydraulic dampers an anti-roll bar and a longitudinal torque arm. Steering was of the recirculating ball type. The hydraulic brakes were initially Girling 12-inch finned drum brakes front and rear; disc brakes were later introduced on the front wheels, and finally on all four. The standard wheels were 16-inch steel disc ones with a 6.5-inch rim width. Early cars had Pirelli Stella Bianca tyres, and later Pirelli Cinturato radial ply tyres. Borrani knock-off wire wheels were optional, as well as wider 185x16-inch radial tyres.

=== Engine and transmission ===
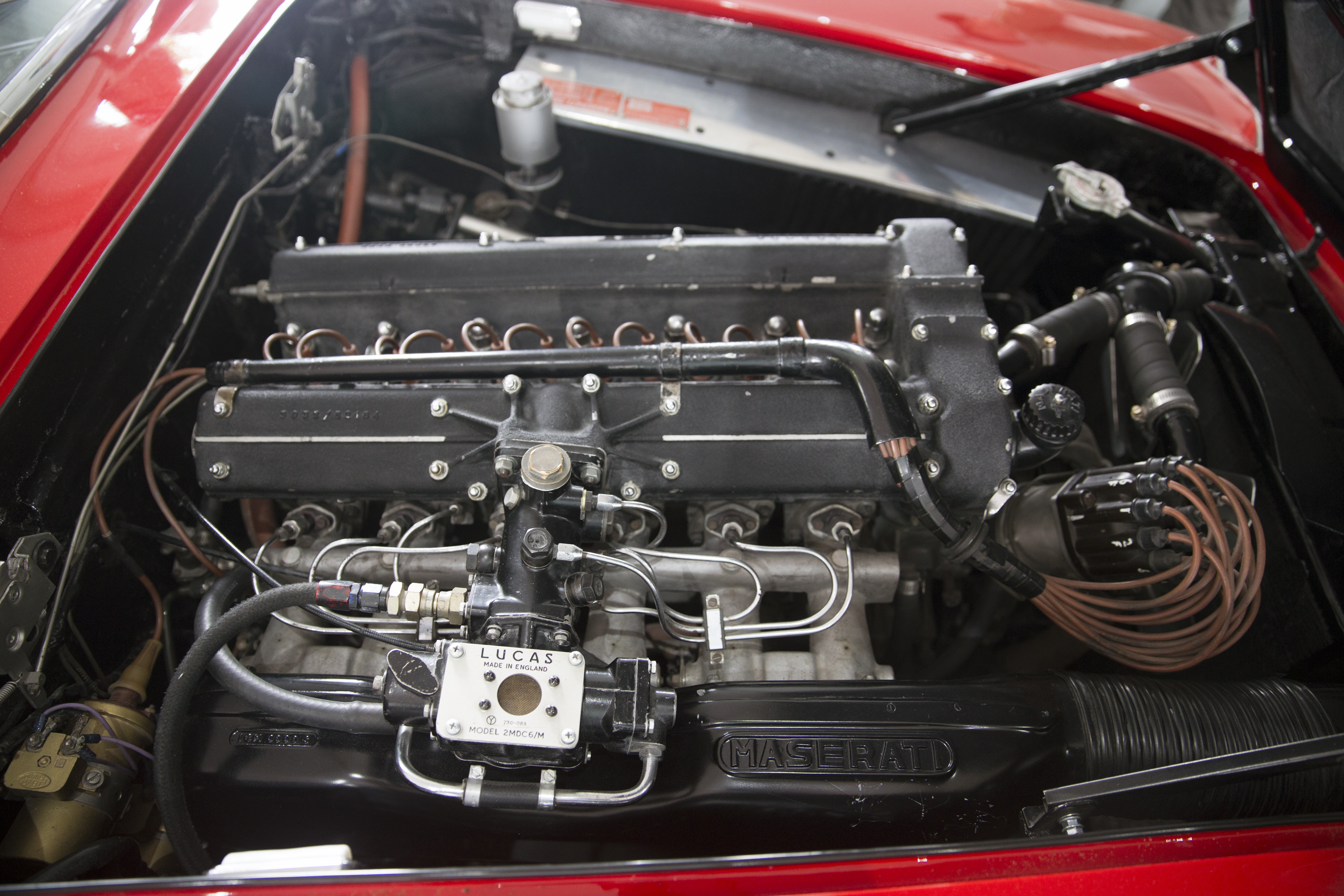
Fuel injected version of the 3500 GTi engine

The Maserati 350S-derived DOHC, 12-valve straight-six engine had a bore and stroke of 86 mm × 100 mm (3.4 in × 3.9 in) and displaced 3,485.29 cc (213 cu in). The engine block was aluminium, with cast iron cylinder sleeves; cylinder heads were aluminium, with cast iron valve seats and hemispherical combustion chambers. It was equipped with a mechanical Marelli ignition, dual ignition and dual fuel pump. It developed 220 PS (162 kW; 217 bhp) at 5,500 rpm when fitted with three twin-choke 42 DCOE Weber carburetor, or 235 PS (173 kW; 232 bhp) at 5,500 rpm with Lucas mechanical fuel injection. The transmission was a 4-speed ZF S4-17 gearbox, later replaced by a ZF S5-17 5-speed, and used an hydraulically actuated Borg & Beck single-plate dry clutch.
