= Maserati Sebring =

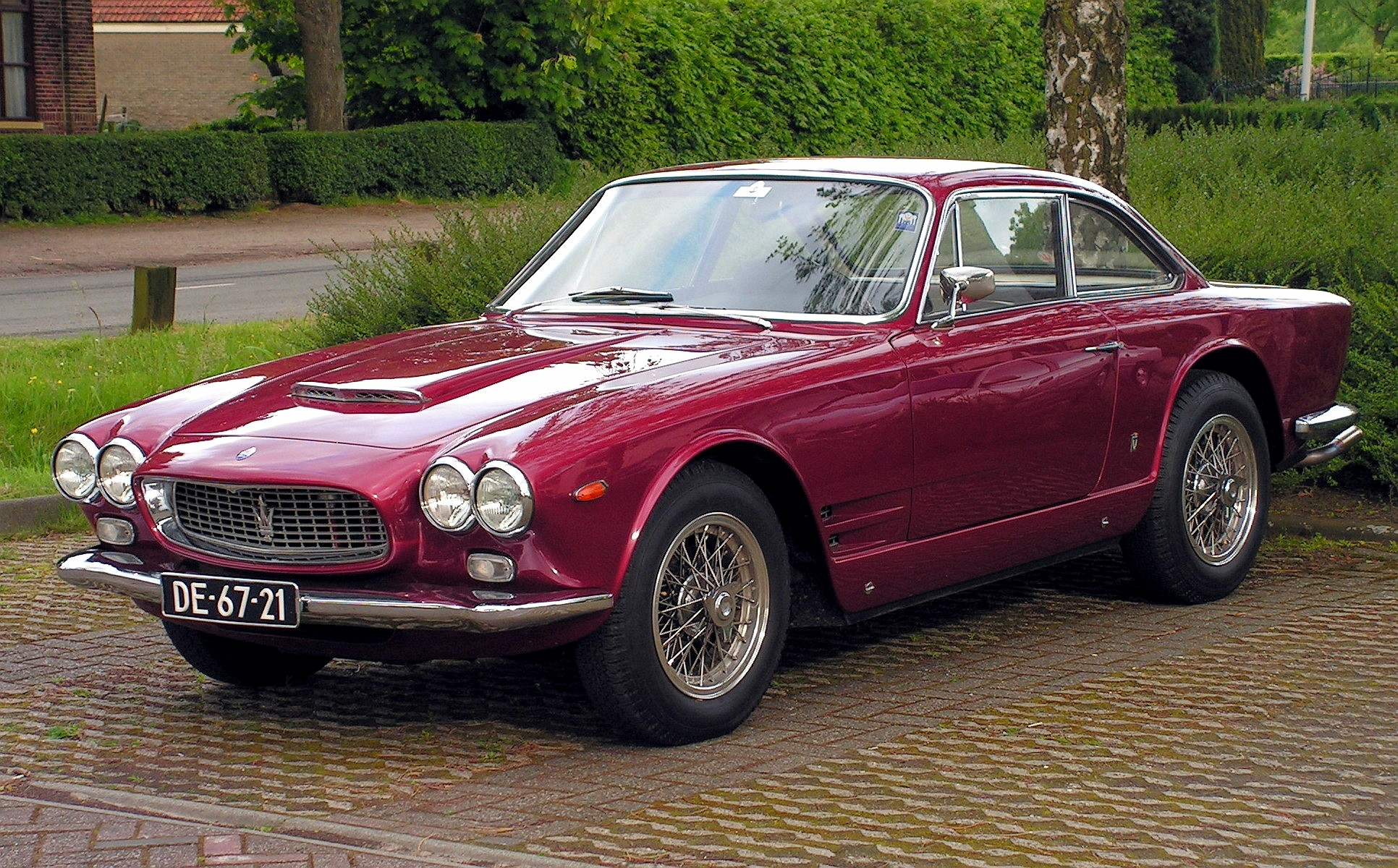
- Maserati Sebring Series I

Overview
- Manufacturer: Maserati
- Also called: Maserati 3500 GTiS
- Production: 1962–1969; 593 produced
- Assembly: Italy: Modena
- Designer: Giovanni Michelotti at Vignale

Body and chassis
- Class: Grand tourer
- Body style: 2+2 coupé
- Layout: Front-engine, rear-wheel-drive
- Chassis: tubular
- Related: Maserati 3500 GT

Powertrain
- Engine: 3485 cc Tipo AM101, 101/10 I6; 3,694 cc Tipo AM106 I6; 4,012 cc Tipo AM106/1 I6
- Transmission: ZF 5-speed manual; 3-speed Borg-Warner automatic (optional)

Dimensions
- Wheelbase: 2,500 mm (98.4 in)
- Length: 4,470 mm (176.0 in)
- Width: 1,665 mm (65.6 in)
- Height: 1,300 mm (51.2 in)
- Curb weight: 1,520 kg (3,351 lb) (dry)

Chronology
- Predecessor: Maserati 3500 GT
- Successor: Maserati Indy

The Maserati Sebring was a two-door 2+2 coupé manufactured by Maserati from 1962 until 1968. Based on the Maserati 3500, the Sebring was aimed at the American Gran Turismo market and named after Maserati's 1957 racing victory at the 12 Hours of Sebring. A single two-seat spyder was built by Vignale in 1963 but did not enter production.

== History ==
=== Series I ===
The Series I (Tipo AM 101/S) was shown at Salon International de l'Auto 1962 and again at the Salone dell'automobile di Torino in 1963. Employing all but the Maserati 3500's coachwork, it could reach 137 mph (220 km/h) and 0–60 mph (97 km/h) in 8.5 seconds. A Borg-Warner automatic transmission was available as an option, a first for Italian automobiles. A total of 348 Series I Sebrings were built between 1962 and 1965. The engine was updated in 1963, gaining 15PS for a total of 235 PS (173 kW; 232 hp). The 3700 engine first appeared in 1964, although only a handful of Series I cars were thus equipped.

=== Series II ===
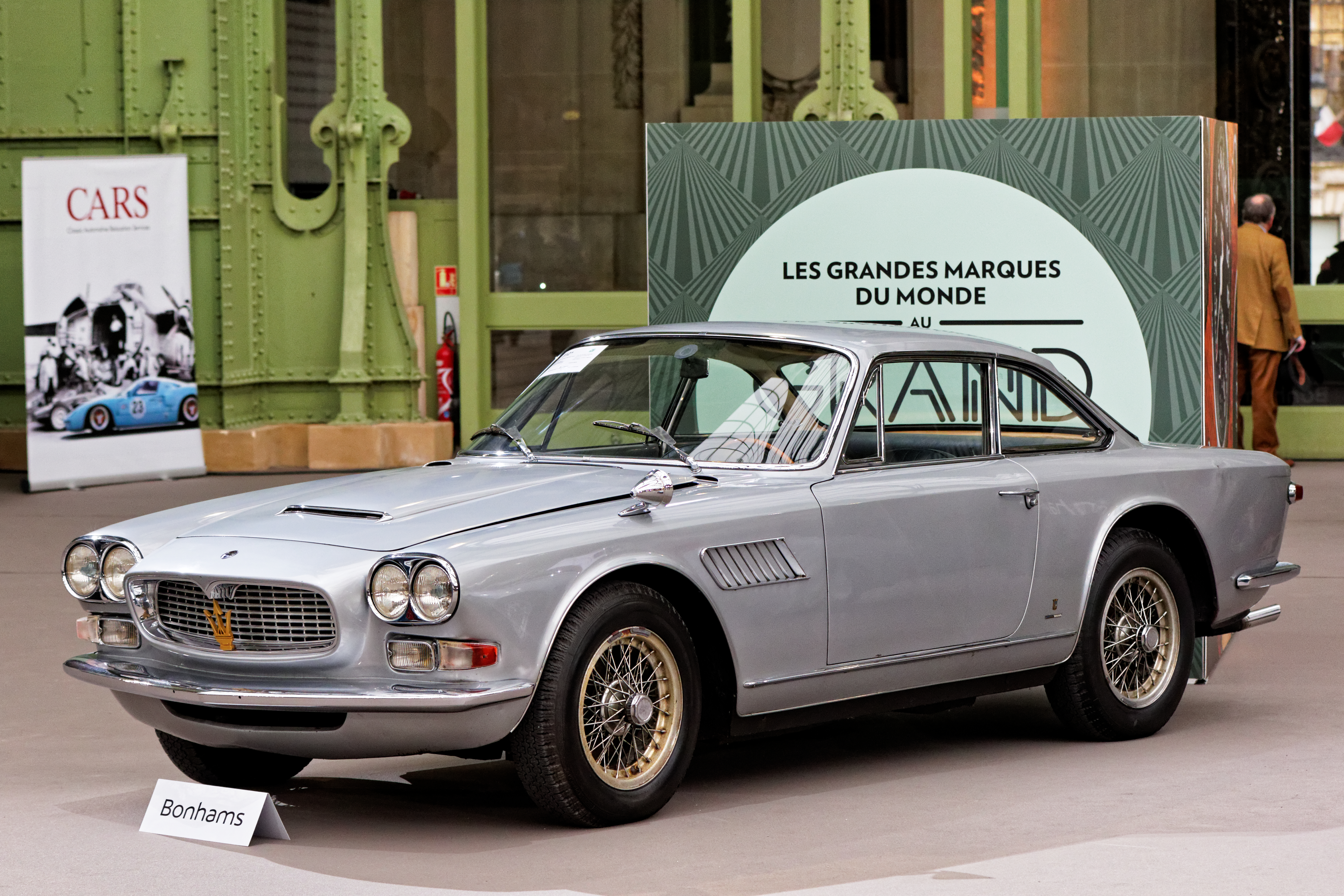
Maserati Sebring Series II

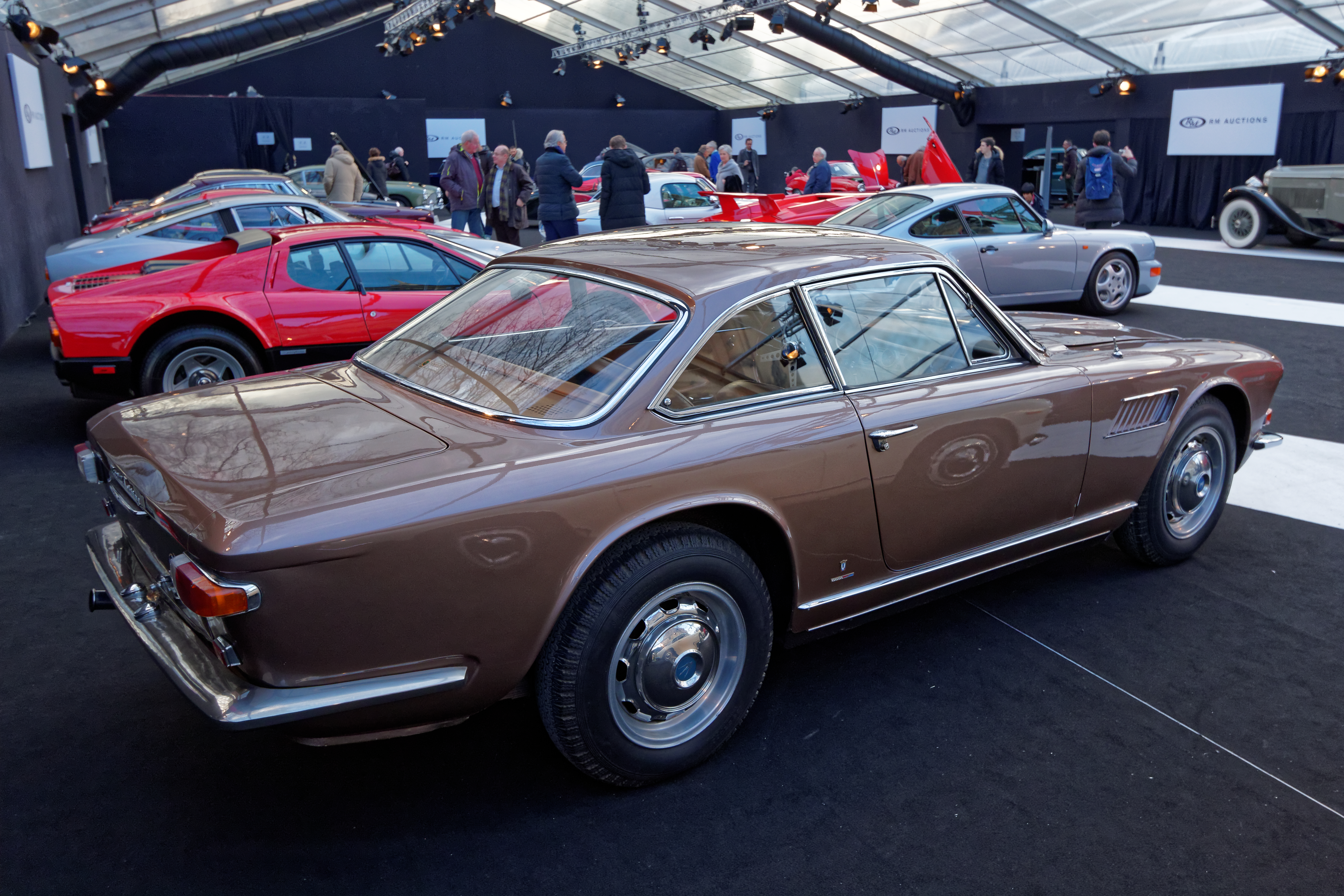
Maserati Sebring 3700 GT Series II rear view

In 1965, the modified Series II (Tipo AM 101/10) was introduced. It had lightly redesigned headlamps, modernized bumpers, new turn signals in front, and new side grilles replacing the lower extraction vents used hitherto. It took minor design cues from the contemporary Quattroporte. At the rear, aside from the squared off bumpers, the taillights were now mounted horizontally rather than vertically and the bootlid opening was narrowed somewhat. The Series II rode on larger 205x15 Pirelli Cinturatos. A run of 247 units were made from 1964 until 1968. Along with the 3500 engine, the 3700 (lengthened stroke which enlarged it to 3,694 cc (225 cubic inches)) and the even larger 4000 were added.

The 4000 GTiS has a 4,012 cc engine producing 255 PS (188 kW; 252 hp) at 5,200 rpm. It remained in production until 1968, when financial constraints forced Maserati to drop its older models from production. No major updates took place over the last three years of production, except for a slight power gain for the 4000, now up to 265 PS (195 kW; 261 hp). It is believed that around 446 Sebrings were made in total from 1962 to 1969, with 348 units of the Sebring 3.5 and an estimated 98 of the 3.7 and 4.0 (combined). Anecdotal evidence related that according to the practice of marking interior panels and wood fitted pieces, the actual model number was only written in yellow grease marker on the rear surfaces of the interior bodywork. Evidence from assumed number 69 reveals parts with number “69 di 96” suggesting only 96 models were produced making them the rarest of the series 2 cars produced.

Jeremy Clarkson named the Sebring as #77 on his Top 100 Cars list.
