= Momo Mirage =

American Grand Touring coupe built in Italy

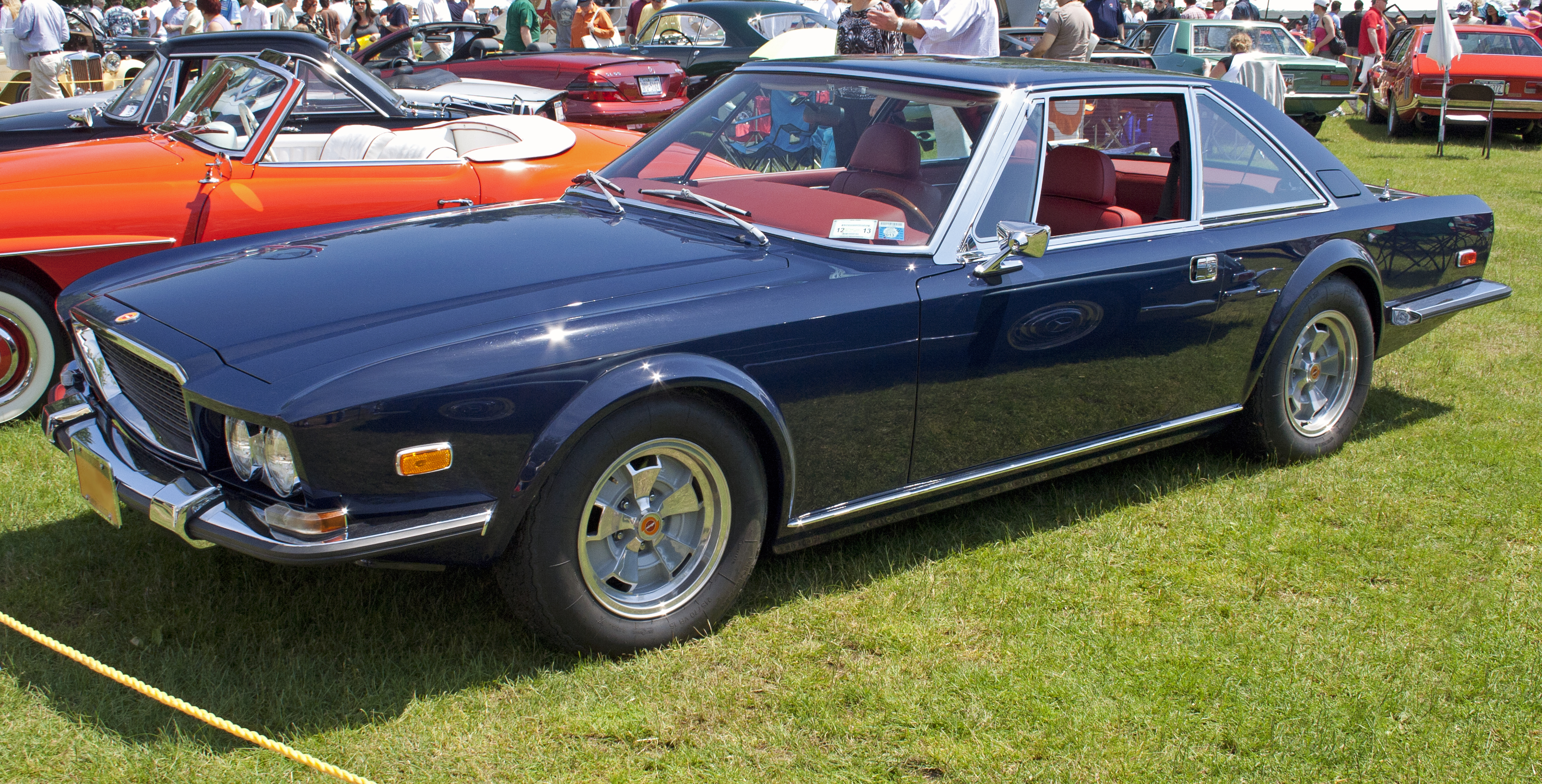

Overview
- Manufacturer: The Momo Corporation
- Model years: 1972
- Designer: Gene Garfinkle; Pietro Frua

Body and chassis
- Body style: 2-door 2+2 coupe
- Layout: F/R

Powertrain
- Engine: 350 cu in (5,736 cc) OHV SBC V8
- Transmission: 5-speed ZF manual; 3-speed Turbo-Hydramatic automatic

The Momo Mirage is an American Grand Touring coupe built in Italy. Several prototypes were completed in the early 1970s before the project was cancelled.

== History ==
=== Conception ===
The Momo Mirage was created by Peter Kalikow, with considerable input from Alfred Momo. Kalikow is an American businessman involved in construction and real estate, while Momo was a master mechanic, European automobile importer, and former manager of Briggs Cunningham's racing team.

Kalikow and Momo met when the former bought a Jaguar XK-E from Momo's New York Jaguar distributorship. The two struck up a friendship, and Kalikow began spending many hours at the Momo Corporation's shops in Woodside, Queens. Kalikow and Momo talked about what they would like in a Grand Touring automobile, comparing the existing high-performance GTs and high-end luxury models with their ideal. As a result, Kalikow decided to design and build his own luxurious high-performance four-seat car. Kalikow outlined the car's general configuration, while Momo provided technical support and industry contacts.

Kalikow embarked on the project in earnest in early 1968, and one of the first steps he took was to buy control of Momo's existing company, becoming the president of the Momo Corporation.

=== Development ===
Kalikow and Momo travelled to Turin, Italy in search of a carrozzeria to build the Mirage's chassis. Unsuccessful there, they went south to Modena, where they met former Maserati chief engineer Giulio Alfieri, and over the course of three days in the summer of 1969 agreed upon the chassis' specifications. Alfieri promised a completed chassis in 90 days. Hugo Bragoni, a former Momo employee then working as an engineer at Fiat, was hired by Kalikow and given oversight of the chassis construction and parts supply.

When they returned to Italy late that year, little progress on the chassis had been made, so Momo suggested approaching Automobili Stanguellini. Vittorio Stanguellini's company was a small Italian constructor of sports cars and Formula Junior racers whose products Momo had previously imported into the US.

Still in need of a coachbuilder, Kalikow was in England to attend a motor show when he happened to meet Derek Hurlock, chairman and managing director of AC Cars. Hurlock encouraged Kalikow to approach Pietro Frua, who had styled and built the AC 428—a car generally similar in concept to the Mirage. Frua said that he would make a body buck for Kalikow to review, then provide a completed body 90 days after receiving a chassis from Stanguellini. The contract for the bodywork was awarded to Frua in the autumn of 1970.

In 1970 Frua produced a concept called the Momo AM Coupé. This earlier design, apparently unrelated to Kalikow's project, had a more traditional, more rounded shape than that of the Mirage. It has been suggested that the client for this exercise was Gianpiero Moretti's Momo company.

Kalikow selected designer Gene Garfinkle, rather than Frua, to style the Mirage's body. Garfinkle's name had been suggested to Kalikow by Dick Fritz, General Manager at Luigi Chinetti's Ferrari dealership. Garfinkle was a graduate of California's ArtCenter College of Design who had worked for GM in their styling department, then spent periods working at a studio with Pete Brock and as an independent designer before joining Raymond Loewy's studio in New York. After discussing the project with Kalikow in early 1970, Garfinkle drew the original shape for the Mirage, largely working alone. By May Garfinkle had two proposals ready for review.

To source an powerplant for the car, Momo called Bill Mitchell at GM, who agreed to supply a version of the Chevrolet small block engine for Kalikow's coupe.

=== Prototypes ===
After reviewing a scale model of the design, Kalikow returned to Frua on 2 January 1971 to approve the full-size body buck's shape.

The first engine delivered by GM became a testbed for an in-house project to develop a fuel injection system for the car. To provide an engine for the first prototype Momo quickly bought a second engine and transmission and shipped them to Italy.

Chassis 001 was completed in March 1971, and the finished car first fired up in September. This car was equipped with a Quadrajet carbureted engine and automatic transmission. Painted maroon, it was shown informally in Italy and used for road testing, then appeared on the December cover of Road & Track magazine. The car was shipped to the US for a brief private showing, then sent back to France for the Salon in Paris.

A second prototype, 002, was completed in early 1972. Painted blue, this car included many refinements over the first prototype, including revised suspension geometry, increased ride height, and Campagnolo wheels instead of 001's custom set. It also was reported to have had a Chevrolet LT-1 engine with four twin-choke Weber carburetors and a 5-speed manual transmission from ZF. After an informal road test Kalikow thought that a taller (numerically lower) final drive ratio paired with the manual transmission would be a suitable configuration for cars sold in Europe.

The Mirage officially debuted at the 1972 New York International Auto Show.

Production was scheduled to begin in 1972. Kalikow planned for an initial run of 25 vehicles, with a second run of 250 if the first was successful. The anticipated selling price for the car was to be US$12,000.

In the late 1960s and early 1970s Italy experienced an escalating breakdown of labor relations. This led to frequent work stoppages, strikes, and shortages of materials and supplies. As a result, Frua first increased their assembly price per car from $3650 to $7000 and then, as conditions worsened, increased it again to $12000 per car, coincident with a corresponding doubling of the cost of each chassis from Stanguellini to $8000.

With costs far outstripping the anticipated selling price, in autumn 1972 Kalikow and Momo cancelled the project.

By that time, building the Mirage had cost Kalikow half a million US dollars.

=== Postscript ===
Stanguellini was contracted to produce nine chassis. At least six of these went to Frua for final assembly:

- The first three cars completed included the maroon and blue prototypes as well as a later car that was originally silver. As of this writing these three are owned by Peter Kalikow and make occasional appearances at classic auto shows.
- A fourth car was reportedly bought by General Motors.
- A fifth car is said to have been sold by Stanguellini in Italy and later destroyed in a fire.
- A rumored sixth vehicle was left unfinished.

The fate, or even existence, of the three outstanding Stanguellini chassis is uncertain. It is rumored, but not confirmed, that they were also completed by Frua and eventually sold.

The maroon car appeared at the 2001 Meadow Brook Concours d'Elegance.

The silver car was shown in April 2009 at the Concorso d'Eleganza Villa d'Este.

In 2012 Kalikow had chassis 105 completely restored, with new aluminum bodywork. It was shown at the 2012 Amelia Island Concours d'Elegance.

The Momo Mirage and its history is the subject of a documentary film titled "The Mirage" by director Peter Roper, released in 2014.

== Features ==
=== Chassis and running gear ===
Two large steel tubes served as the chassis' major longitudinal members, connected by three large diameter rectangular cross-ties. On top of this Stanguellini added a steel platform structure. A front subframe carried the engine and transmission, while in the rear another subframe carried the differential.

The front suspension of the Mirage was an upper and lower A-arm system from the Jaguar Mark 2. The rear system was similar in principle, but used custom uprights. Shock absorbers and brakes front and rear were Koni telescopics and Girling disks respectively. Steering was a power assisted rack and pinion from Alford & Alder.

=== Bodywork and styling ===
Both Kalikow and Garfinkle had been impressed by the Lancia Marica coupe designed by Tom Tjaarda for Ghia and shown at the 1969 Turin Auto Show, and agreed to make this car the template for the Mirage. Kalikow originally planned to offer the Mirage as both a coupe and a convertible. The final design was a conservatively styled two-door 2+2 coupe with a long hood and a large grille flanked by pairs of round headlamps. Frua fabricated the bodywork in steel.

=== Powertrain ===
The Mirage was powered by a version of the 350 cu in (5.7 L) Chevrolet small block V8 engine used in the Chevrolet Corvette. This is a 90° V8 with a cast iron block. The particular version used is frequently identified as an LT-1. One source that says the Mirage had an LT-1 goes on to say that it had a Quadrajet carburetor, a compression ratio of 8.5:1, and an output of about 300 hp. This may indicate that at least one of the prototype's engines was in fact the ZQ3 model that was the Corvette's base engine, as suggested by another source.

To give the engine a distinct look, Kalikow had the staff at the Momo Corporation begin development of a fuel injection system for the Mirage. Some references say this was a modified Lucas injection system. Problems dogged the injection project, and when Weber promised to deliver a carburetor-based induction system that would meet US regulations, Kalikow stopped work on the injection system. The second prototype used four Weber carburetors.

Two transmission choices were to be offered: a 5-speed ZF manual, and a 3-speed GM Turbo-Hydramatic automatic.

== Technical data ==
| Momo Mirage | Detail |
|---|---|
| Engine: | Chevrolet small-block V8 |
| Displacement: | 350 cu in (5,736 cc) |
| Bore × Stroke: | 4.001 in × 3.48 in (102 mm × 88 mm) |
| Maximum power: | 300 hp (224 kW) at 5700 rpm |
| Maximum torque: | 354 ft⋅lb (480 N⋅m) at 4000 rpm |
| Compression ratio: | 8.5:1 |
| Valvetrain: | Single cam-in-block, pushrods, rocker arms, 2 overhead valves per cylinder |
| Induction: | 1 × 4 bbl Quadrajet carburetor 4 × 2 bbl Weber carburetors |
| Cooling: | Water-cooled |
| Transmission: | 5-speed ZF manual 3-speed Turbo-Hydramatic automatic |
| Steering: | Power assisted rack and pinion |
| Brakes f/r: | Girling vented discs / Girling vented discs |
| Suspension front: | Upper and lower A-arms, coil springs, Koni telescopic shock absorbers |
| Suspension rear: | Upper and lower A-arms, coil springs, Koni telescopic shock absorbers |
| Body/Chassis: | Steel body on steel platform chassis |
| Track f/r: | 59.0 / 59.0 in (1,499 / 1,499 mm) |
| Wheelbase: | 103.9 in (2,639 mm) |
| Tires f/r: | 6.5-18 / 6.5-18 |
| Length; Width; Height: | 195.2 in (4,958 mm); 70.0 in (1,778 mm); 52.5 in (1,334 mm) |
| Weight: | 3,600 lb (1,633 kg) |
| Maximum speed: | 250 km/h (155 mph) |
