= FRUA =

FRUA or Frua may refer to:

- AC 428 Frua, a British GT built by AC Cars from 1965 to 1973
- Pietro Frua, Italian coachbuilder and car designer
- Families for Russian and Ukrainian Adoption, a support organization providing international adoption support resources for families completed through adoption in 32 Eastern European and Central Asian countries
- Forgotten Realms: Unlimited Adventures, a video game originally released on March 17, 1993, by Strategic Simulations, Inc.
