= Velocity Restorations =

- Industry: Automotive
- Founded: 2012; 14 years ago in Pensacola, FL
- Founder: Stuart Wilson
- Headquarters: Cantonment, FL
- Number of employees: 135 (2024)
- Website: https://www.velocityrestorations.com

Velocity Restorations is an American automobile restoration company in Cantonment, Florida that specializes in restorations and restomods of classic vehicles, including first-generation Ford Broncos.

== History ==
The firm was co-founded by Stuart Wilson and Brandon Segers. The pair began building Broncos in Pensacola, Florida, in the early 2010s and established Velocity Restorations in 2012. By 2018 the company operated from a 22,000-square-foot facility and later moved to a 135,000-square-foot shop in Cantonment. In August 2025 Velocity acquired certain assets of Classic Recreations through a court-approved bankruptcy sale, including intellectual property, inventory, and equipment.

== Operations and Products ==
Velocity employs assembly-line workflows, standardized components, and online configurators to build restomod vehicles, primarily classic Broncos. Builds are typically completed in about 14 weeks, using original sheet metal and contemporary engines such as Ford Coyote and Chevrolet LT1 units. The company reports producing approximately 160 vehicles per year, including both inventory models and customer-specific builds.

Beyond Broncos, the company has produced builds of the Chevrolet K5 Blazer, C10/K10s, International Scouts, and Ford F-100/F-250/Mustang. Typical upgrades include revised chassis components, rack-and-pinion steering, disc brakes, and contemporary crate engines (including Coyote-swap applications) while retaining period bodywork.

Factory work is organized into stations for body preparation, paint, electrical, chassis/suspension, drivetrain, and interior trim. The company maintains in-house upholstery and reproduces select components as needed. Vehicles undergo multi-point inspection, dynamometer checks, and road testing prior to delivery.

Noted projects include a pink 1973 Bronco (Feb. 2024), a 1972 F-150 “Heritage Series” (2025), and Post Malone–commissioned builds. Velocity has also exhibited vehicles at the SEMA Show, including entries in SEMA’s Battle of the Builders program. Placements include category recognition for a Bronco and a “Top 12” finalist appearance for a Ford F-250 build. Its 2025 entry was a Fox Body Mustang, the world's first restomod of this model.
