= Pietro Frua =

Italian automobile designer (1913–1983)

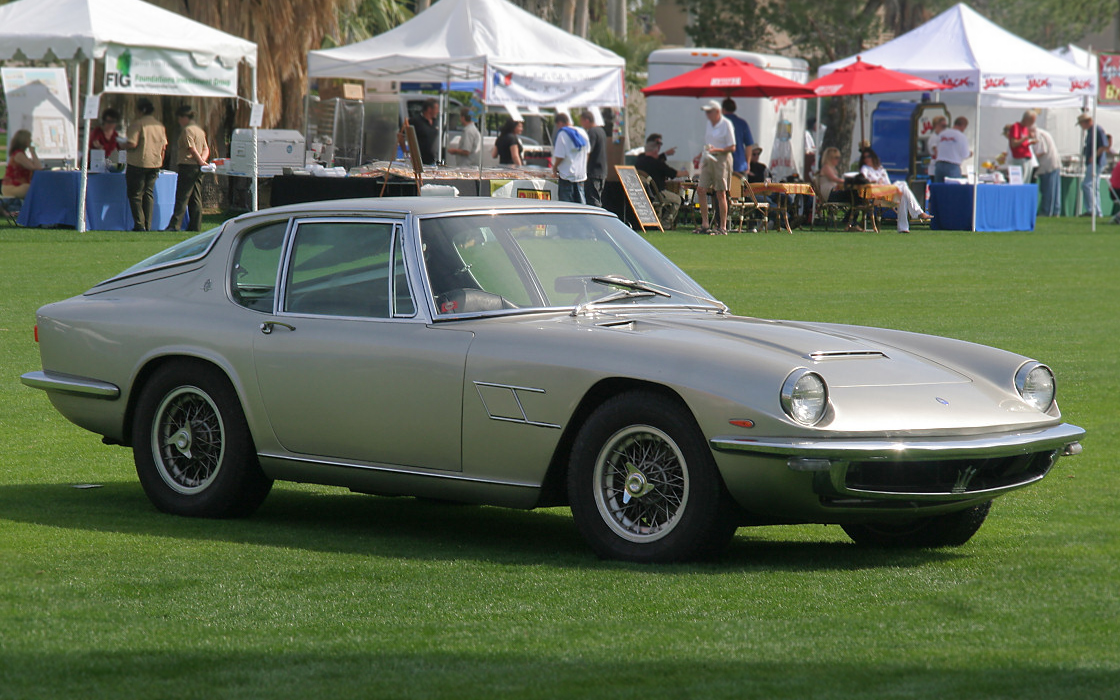
1967 Maserati Mistral Coupe

Pietro Frua (2 May 1913 - 28 June 1983) was one of the leading Italian coachbuilders and car designers during the 1950s and 1960s.

== Early years ==
Frua was born in Turin, the centre of coachbuilding in northern Italy. He was the fourth son of Angela, a seamstress, and Carlo Frua, an employee of Fiat.

After school he was educated as a draftsman at the Scuola Allievi Fiat, where he underwent his apprenticeship.

== Design career ==
Frua's professional career began at the age of 17, when he joined Stabilimenti Farina as a draftsman. At the age of 22, he became Director of Styling at the Stabilimenti Farina, already a leading Turin coachbuilder employing several hundred people. Some credit him with having influenced early designs of the iconic Vespa while at Farina. That was where Frua had his first contact with Giovanni Michelotti, who became his successor as Head of Styling after he started his own studio in 1938.

During World War II car-styling work was scarce and Frua had to turn to designing children's cars, electric ovens and kitchen units, as well as a monocoque motorscooter.

Frua planned for post-war times: in 1944 he bought a bombed-out factory, hired 15 workers (including Sergio Coggiola, who founded his own carrozzeria in 1966) and equipped himself to design and build cars.

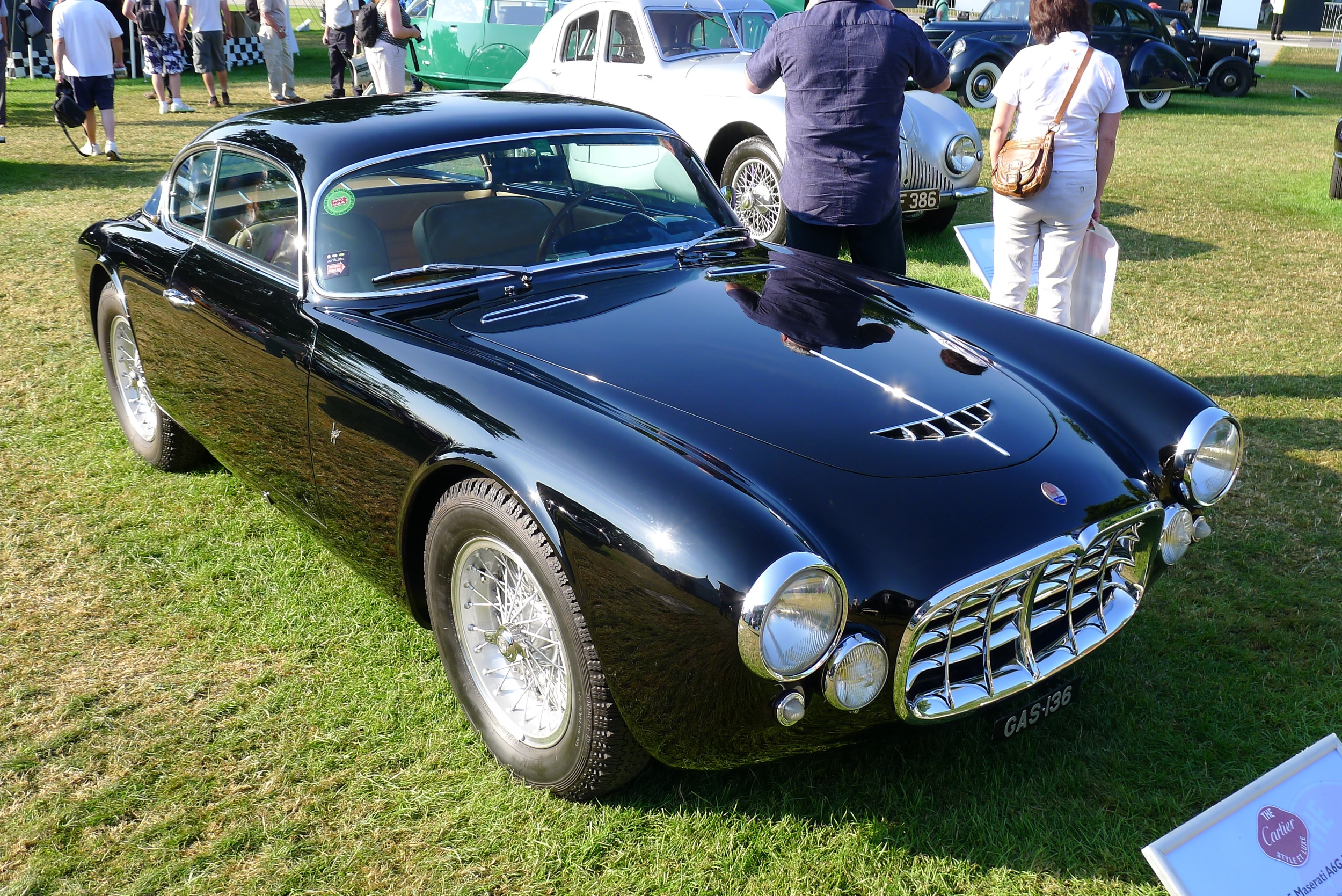
1955 Maserati A6G/54 Coupé by Frua

His first known car is a 1946 Fiat 1100C spyder. Maserati was one of the first clients who contracted Frua for the styling of their new 2-litre, 6-cylinder sports car, the A6G. From 1950 to 1957, Frua built 19 Spyders and seven coupés in three different design series – including some on the A6 GCS racing chassis.

In 1957, Frua sold his small coachbuilding company to Carrozzeria Ghia in Turin, and Ghia director Luigi Segre appointed him head of Ghia Design. In this short period, Frua was responsible for the successful Renault Floride, which experienced well-deserved commercial success (about 117,000 were sold in ten years). This success led to a disagreement between Segre and Frua over the car's “paternity”, and Frua left Ghia to start his own design studio again.

At the same time, Pelle Petterson designed his Volvo P1800 under the attentive eye of Frua and, not surprisingly, it is often attributed to Frua's pen. From 1957 to 1959, Frua also designed several cars for Ghia-Aigle, the former Swiss subsidiary of Ghia Turin, already independent at that time. Giovanni Michelotti was his predecessor in this position.

After Ghia-Aigle finished coachbuilding, a former employee, Adriano Guglielmetti, started his own business and founded Carrosserie Italsuisse in Geneva. Again Pietro Frua did the drawings and, most probably, built all the prototypes for this company. After a Corvair-like styled pontoon-Beetle in 1960, Italsuisse showed a Maserati 3500 GTI Coupé on the Italsuisse stand at the 1961 Motor Show in Geneva, together with two tasteful bodies on Studebaker chassis. In 1964 a lovely little Spyder followed with Opel Kadett mechanics.

During the 1960s Pietro Frua was among the most prominent car designers in Italy. The “Frua line” was synonymous with the good taste of a single man. He followed each car's realization to the last detail of fully functional one-offs and prototypes, often driving them to their presentation at the motor shows in Europe.

=== Glas ===
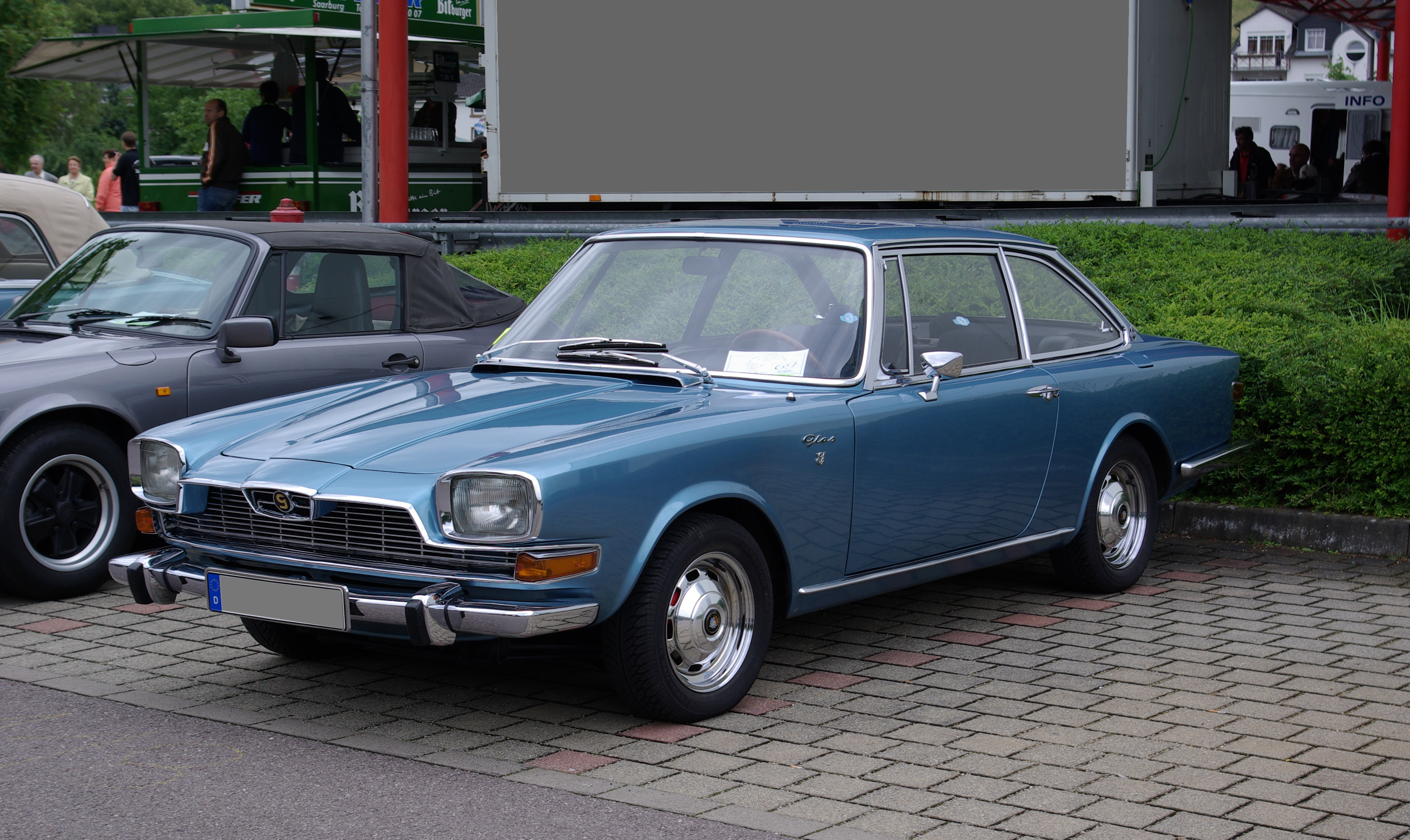
The Glas 2600 V8

In 1963, at the age of 50 and at the peak of his career, Frua designed a range of cars for Glas, Germany's smallest car-maker. This included the GT Coupé and Cabriolet as well as the larger V8-engined 2600, often called "Glaserati" for its likeness with Frua's Maserati-designs. These were built until 1968 as the BMW GT, after BMW had bought Glas.

=== Maserati Mistral ===
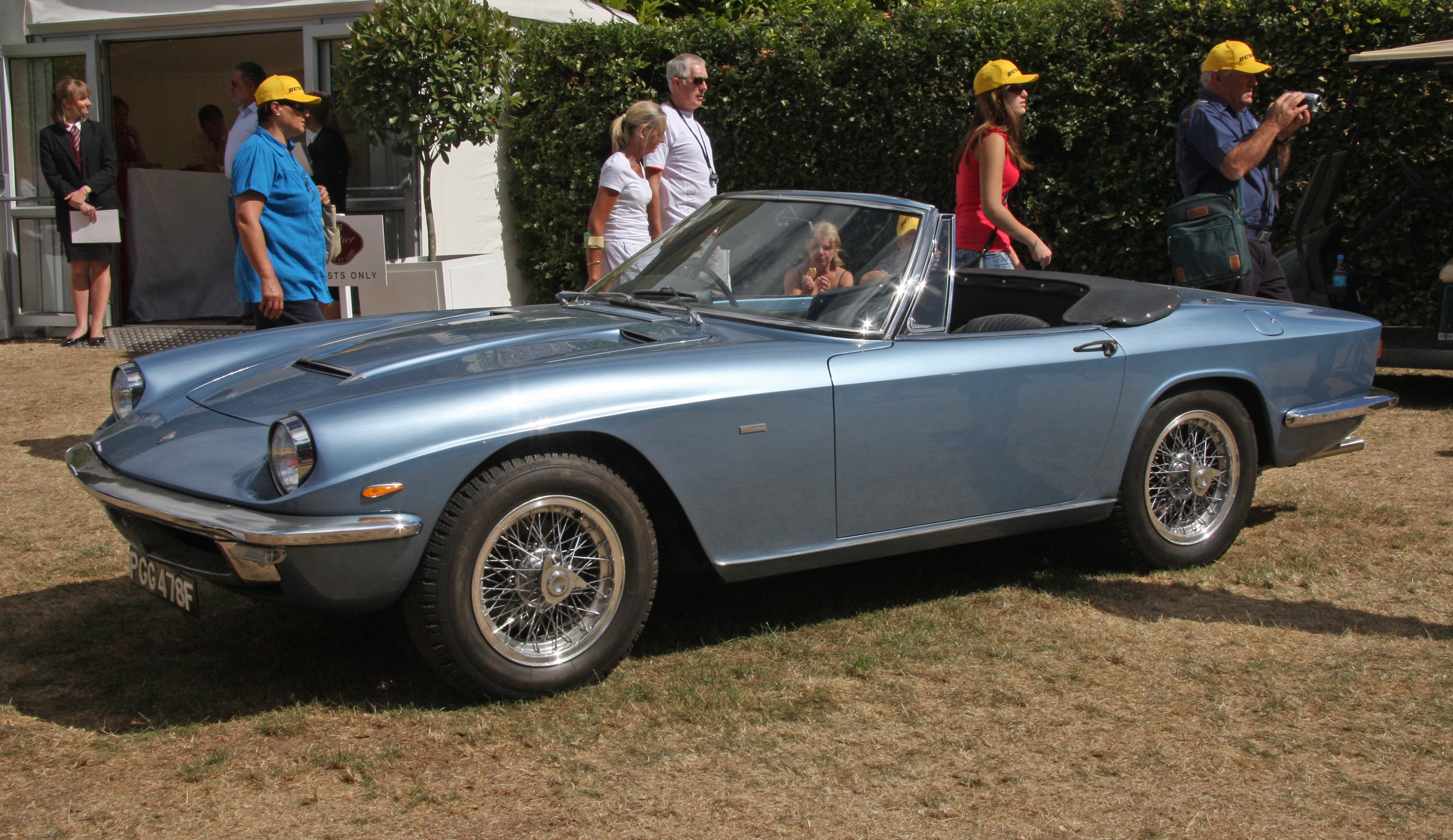
1967 Maserati Mistral Spyder

Also in 1963, Maserati showed the Frua-bodied four-door Quattroporte which, after several one-offs, re-established Frua's connection with this manufacturer. Two years later, the Mistral was shown, cementing Frua's status in the mid-sixties. With these cars Maserati was positioned into a new market of luxury and powerful, understated cars.

=== AC 428 Frua ===
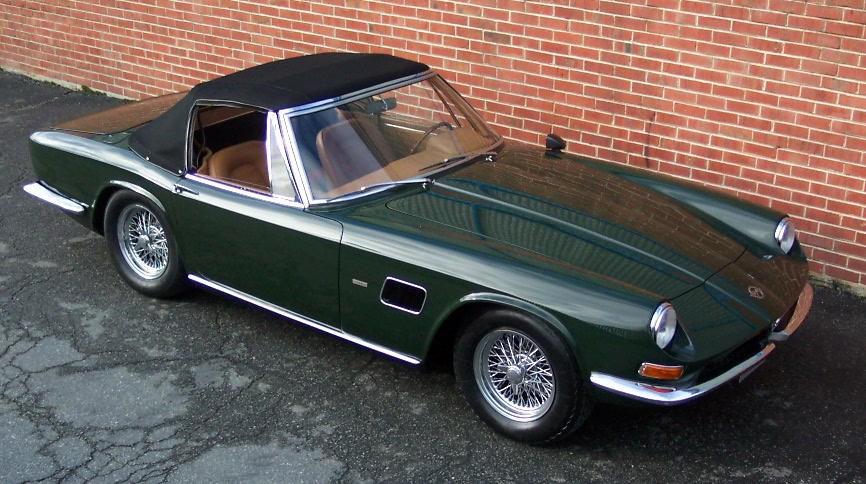
1971 AC 428 Frua roadster

In 1965, AC showed the powerful, Frua-bodied 7-litre AC 428 Frua Spyder, which drew from the Mistral's shape. A coupé followed in 1967. In the same year, the Swiss racing driver and Ferrari importer Peter Monteverdi started to build a Frua-bodied sport coupé, the Chrysler engined Monteverdi High Speed 375S. He also designed the Monteverdi 2000 GTI, but this remained a one-off. Due to Frua's limited capacities, the production of the following High Speed models went to Fissore in Turin. However, the Monteverdi Hai 450 is believed to have been designed by Frua.

At the end of the 1960s, Frua tried in vain to prolong his success with Glas by making a dozen proposals to BMW. BMW decided to make it on their own.

Although he was not the principal designer, Frua produced the bodywork and did final assembly and detailing for Peter Kalikow's Momo Mirage prototypes in the early 1970s. Frua had been recommended to Kalikow by Derek Hurlock, chairman and managing director of AC Cars, in part because of his work on the AC 428.

In the 1970s Frua reduced the frequency of his presentations, but in the sixth decade of his life he still demonstrated his good taste and craftsmanship to the younger ones who already had taken their role in the industrial process. There was no longer a demand to build completely detailed and functional prototypes in less than ten weeks, and no more customers for special bodied one-offs. One of his last designs to enter series production was the two-door GT Maserati Kyalami first shown at the 1976 Geneva Motor Show.

== Later years ==
In 1982 Pietro Frua developed cancer and had unsuccessful surgery in the autumn of that year. He married his long-time assistant, Gina, shortly before he died on 28 June 1983, a few weeks after his 70th birthday.

== See also ==
- Car body style
- Car classification
