= Peter Kalikow =

American real estate developer

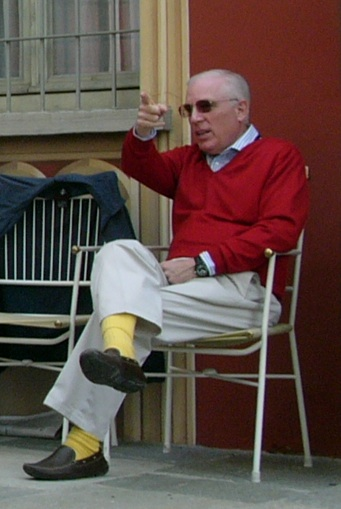
- Kalikow in 2007

8th Chairman of the Metropolitan Transportation Authority
- In office March 13, 2001 – October 22, 2007
- Governor: George Pataki; Eliot Spitzer
- Preceded by: E. Virgil Conway
- Succeeded by: H. Dale Hemmerdinger

Personal details
- Born: December 1, 1942 (age 83)
- Spouse: Mary Typaldos Jacobatos
- Children: 2
- Occupation: Real estate developer

Peter Stephen Kalikow (born December 1, 1942) is president of H. J. Kalikow & Company, LLC, a New York City-based real estate firm. He is a former chairman of the Metropolitan Transportation Authority (MTA), former commissioner of the Port Authority of New York and New Jersey and past owner and publisher of the New York Post.

== Early life ==
Peter Stephen Kalikow was born on December 1, 1942, and raised in Forest Hills, Queens, the firstborn son of Juliet (née Citrin) and Harold J. Kalikow. Peter’s family is Jewish.

His grandfather Joseph Kalikow emigrated to the United States from Russia in 1899 and began the Kalikow real estate dynasty by developing housing on large tracts of undeveloped farmland in Queens in the 1930s. By the 1950's Joseph and his sons made a small fortune from the post-World War II housing boom having built over 20 six-story apartment buildings.

== Career ==
After graduating from Hofstra University, Kalikow began his career in real estate in 1967.

His first building was the Park Kensington, completed in 1969 in Great Neck.

In the late 1970 Kalikow befriended Alfred Momo, a former car racing team manager who worked for Jaguar. The two collaborated to create the Momo Mirage. The concept was featured on the front cover of the December 1971 issue of Road & Track. Due to the market and economic situation in Italy where the car was being produced, only a handful examples were built.

In 1973 Kalikow shifted his full attention to real estate. By 1984 Kalikow had built over 10 residential properties, including the office building 101 Park Avenue in midtown Manhattan, and acquired several other properties, including one in London. He acquired 195 Broadway in 1983.

In 1988, Kalikow purchased The New York Post from Rupert Murdoch for $37.6 million. In 1993, Kalikow declared bankruptcy and lost the newspaper, which was eventually purchased by Murdoch's News Corporation.

Kalikow served as chairman of the Metropolitan Transportation Authority from March 2001 to October 2007. He was appointed by then-governor George Pataki, and continued his service into the governorship of Eliot Spitzer.

In May 2000, Kalikow was named chairman of the Grand Central Partnership, one of New York City's Business Improvement Districts (BIDs). Kalikow company officers are located in 101 Park Avenue, located near Grand Central Terminal.

== Political involvement ==
Kalikow endorsed Herman Cain in the US presidential election, 2012. When Cain dropped out of the race, it was revealed that his "super PAC", called "Cain Connections," was funded by a single $50,000 donation from Kalikow.

== Philanthropy and accolades ==
In 1982, he was awarded the Israel Peace Medal for his dedication to assisting the nation's development. In November 2008, Kalikow was honored by Consul General of Italy Francesco M. Talo, with the Commendatore in the Order of Merit of the Italian Republic.

Kalikow has sat on the board of trustees of New York-Presbyterian Hospital since 1987. He also received a John Jay Award from Columbia College in 2004.

In 2015, Kalikow, a Hofstra University trustee and alumnus, established the Peter S. Kalikow School of Government, Public Policy and International Affairs at Hofstra with a $12 million gift. Kalikow has been instrumental in enhancing Hofstra's reputation as one of the preeminent universities with a focus on the American presidency. Prior to this gift, Kalikow endowed the Peter S. Kalikow Chair in Presidential Studies and the Peter S. Kalikow Center for the Study of the American Presidency. Kalikow also donated to Temple Emanu El, where the chief rabbi position is named after him.

== Personal life ==
In 1971, he married Mary Typaldos Jacobatos; they have two children, Nicholas Alexander and Kathryn Harold. He is known for his car collection, with a particular passion for vintage Ferraris.

His daughter Kathryn Harold works with her father at HJ Kalikow and Co LLC. and represents the fourth generation of ownership and leadership of the Kalikow Organization. She is named for her grandfather Harold who began HJ Kalikow with his son Peter in 1965. She is a Principal owner and is involved with all aspects of the company’s assets and operations including property management of 101 Park Avenue, a commercial office building in Midtown Manhattan.

Preceded by E. Virgil Conway	Chairman of the Metropolitan Transportation Authority; 2001-2007	Succeeded by H. Dale Hemmerdinger
