= Museum of the Dog =

Nonprofit museum in New York City

AKC Museum of the Dog
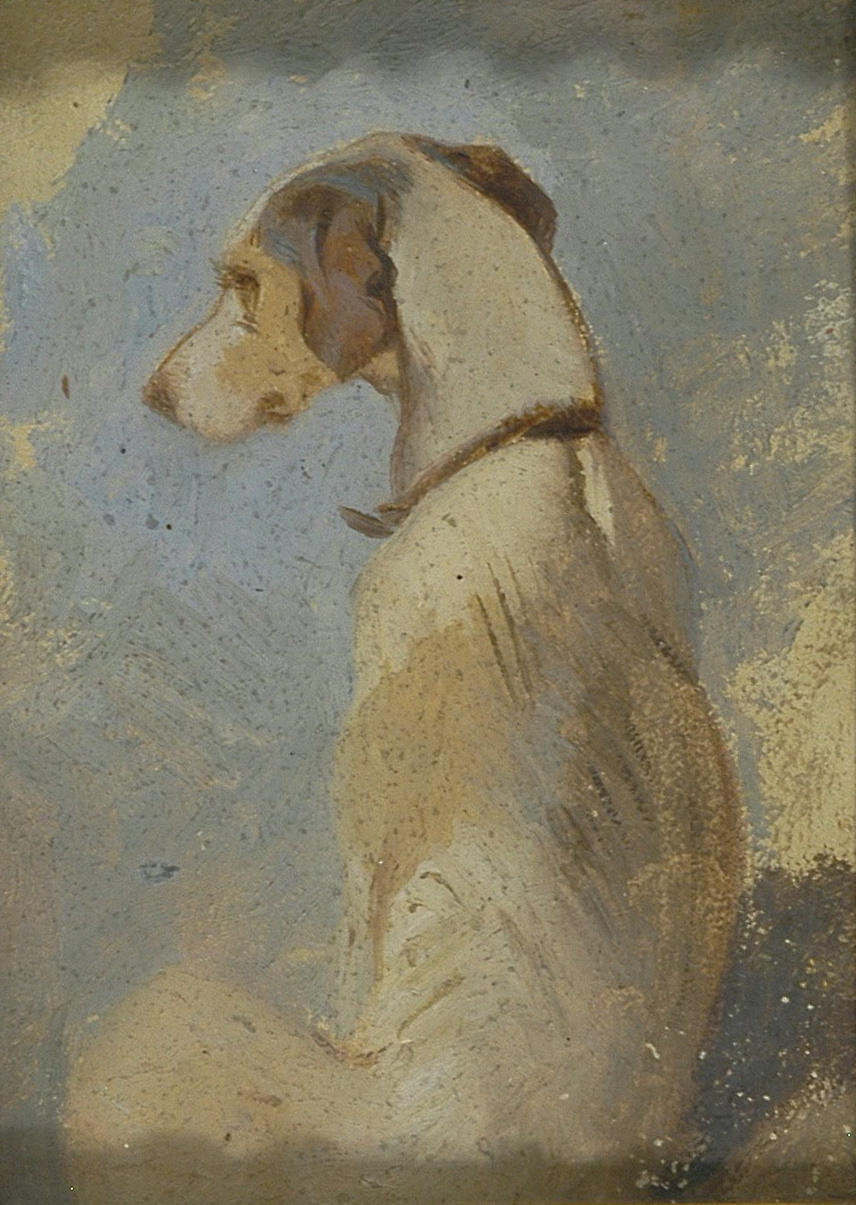
- Painting of a Greyhound by Sir Edwin Henry Landseer
- Established: 1982
- Location: 101 Park Avenue, New York, NY 10178
- Coordinates: 40.750804°N 73.977517°W
- Type: Art museum; History museum
- Collection size: Bronze and ceramic sculptures and paintings
- Curator: American Kennel Club
- Website: museumofthedog.org

AKC Museum of the Dog is a nonprofit canine museum located at 101 Park Avenue in the Murray Hill neighborhood of Manhattan, New York City. The museum features exhibits that include: Dogs in film, dogs of presidents, war dogs, dogs in exploration. The museum features one of the largest collections of dog-related art.

== History ==
The museum began in 1982 with donations from benefactors Frank Sabella, Marie Moore, Nancy-Carol Draper and the Westminster Kennel Foundation. The permanent collection of art consists of Bronze and ceramic sculpture, and paintings. The museum is a subsidiary of the American Kennel Club.

The museum displays artwork by renowned artists: Edwin Landseer, Maud Earl and Arthur Wardle. Much of the artwork is from the 19th century and the early 20th century.

A great deal of the work is from the late 1800s (the AKC was founded in 1884) and the early 20th century, with little abstract or contemporary art.

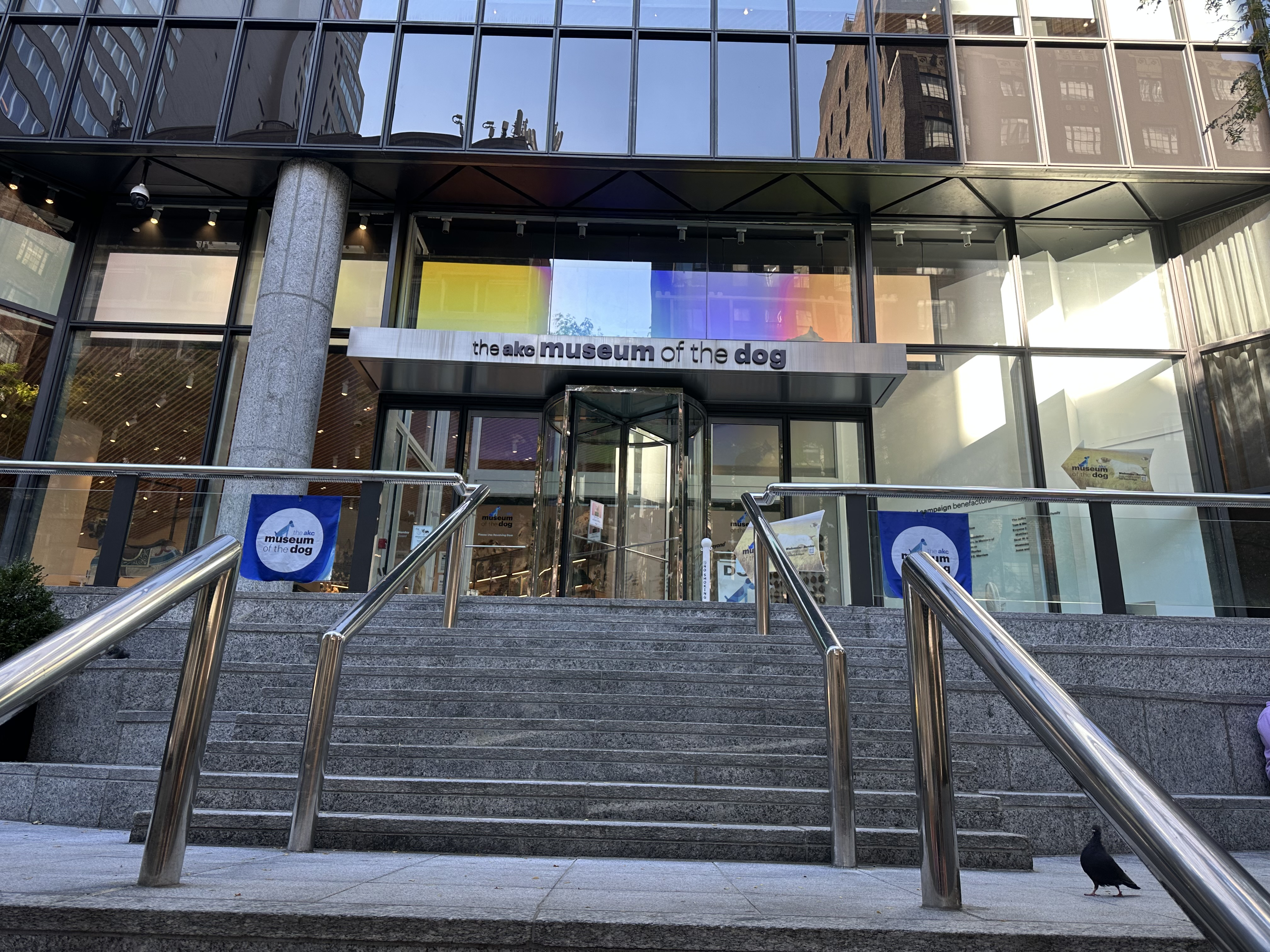
The American Kennel Club Museum of the Dog, 101 Park Avenue, New York, NY 10178

=== Previous locations ===
- 1982, New York Life Building at 51 Madison Avenue
- 1987, Queeny Park, West St Louis County, Missouri
- 2017–present, 101 Park Avenue, New York 10178

=== Exhibitions ===
- Fashionable Dogs (September 7 – December 31, 2023)
- Identity and Restraint: Art of the Dog Collar (April 5 – September 3, 2023)
- Dogs of War and Peace: Wounded Warrior Dogs (March 16 – July 19, 2022)
- 9/11 Remembered: Search and Rescue Dogs (September 7, 2021 – January 2, 2022)
- Women and Dogs in Art in the Twentieth Century
- Women and Dogs in Art
- Dog Days of Summer
