= Ford Toploader transmission =

Toploader Transmission
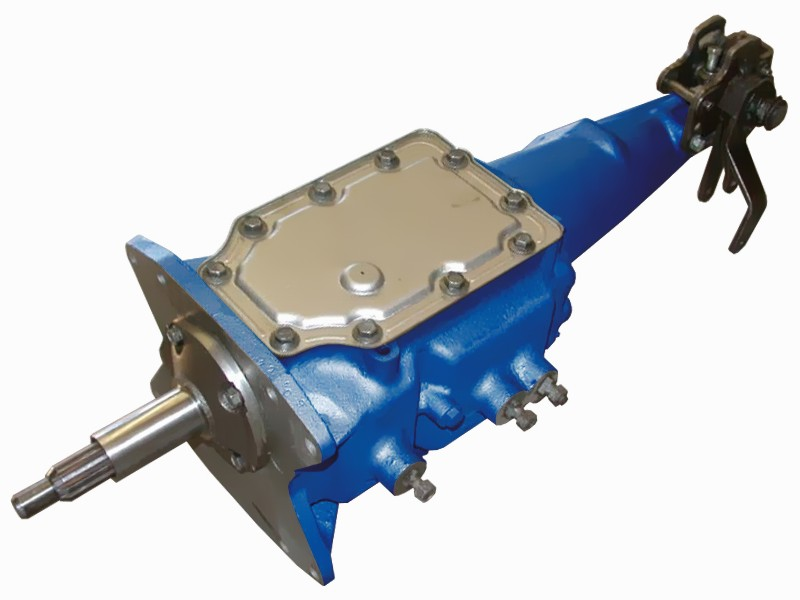

Overview
- Type: 3 or 4-speed manual
- Manufacturer: Ford Motor Company
- Also called: Ford Design 4-Speed; 3.03; Top Loader
- Production: 1964–1973

Chronology
- Predecessor: Borg-Warner T-10; Dagenham 4-speed

A Toploader transmission is a manually shifted gearbox design built in three-speed and four-speed configurations, introduced in 1963 by the Ford Motor Company to replace the BorgWarner T-10. It was used in most Fords and Mercurys from 1964 until 1973, as well as in some foreign models, and is officially designated the 3.03 three speed or Ford design four speed. The designation 3.03 is the centerline distance between counter shaft and mainshaft. The Toploader got its name from the fact that the access plate to the inner workings was located on the top of the main case, as opposed to side access on most gearboxes it would be compared with, such as the Ford Dagenham or GM's Saginaw or Muncie. Distinguishing the three speed from the four is as simple as counting the fasteners on the top plate: the four speed has ten fasteners; the three, nine. Both the three and four speed top loader gearboxes were designed to function in constant mesh, due to synchronizer sleeves being used instead of sliding gears, and be fully synchronized, with the exception of reverse. Forward gears are helical-type, while reverse gear and the exterior of the first and second synchronizers sleeve are spur-type gears. This transmission is also known as the Tremec T-170, HEH, or RUG depending on the year(s) of production. At some point in the early 1970s production of this transmission was moved to Mexico, and the name was changed to Tremec.

== Applications ==
Renowned for high-performance strength and durability, the Toploader (particularly the four-speed) equipped such sought after "A-list" cars as the Mustang, AC Cobra, AC 428 and Sunbeam Tiger as well as the Ford Fairlane, Falcon, Galaxie, Ranchero, Torino, Bronco and the Mercury Comet, Caliente, Cyclone, (Mercury Cougar 1967 1973) and Marauder. Overall, the Toploader was used in 133 different models, and was used extensively in racing as well. The 3 speed 3.03 was also the heavy duty transmission in 1960s Oldsmobile, Buick and Pontiac cars, with FOMOCO cast into the right side of the case; sourcing parts from competitors was common practice in those days, as Lincoln used GM's Hydra-Matic transmission for years in the early 1950s. The Jeep T150 transmission is a Toploader with the addition of a cast top cover and a floor ("cane") shifter.

== Specifications ==
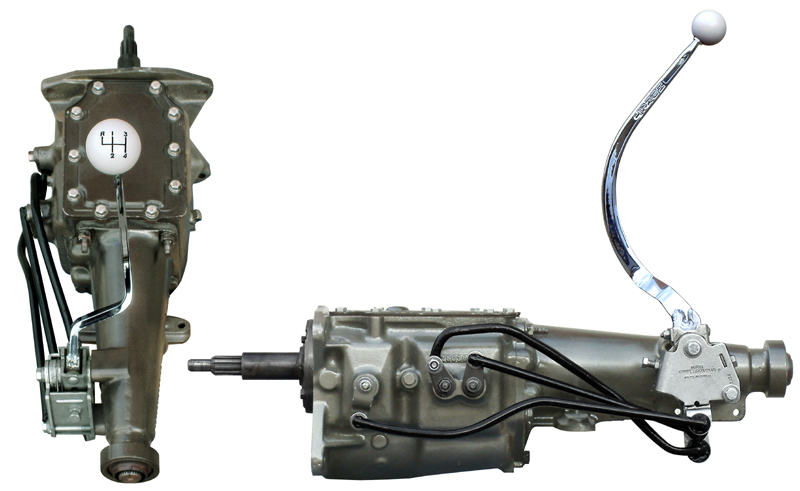
Top and side view, with Hurst shifter

The Toploader comprises two components: the main case, which encloses the gears, input and counter shaft, and the tailhousing, which encloses the speedometer gear and output shaft. The main case measures 10" in length, while the tailhousing measures 14", 15 1/2" or 17", depending on the application.

Shifter bosses are cast into the tailhousing along various points depending on the location of the shifter, as required for each model. Generally Falcons and Comets have shifters mounted forward along the housing, Mustangs rearward, and Fairlanes and full size Fords somewhere in between. Toploaders were also designed for two specific applications: small blocks like the Ford Windsor engine, and big blocks like the Ford FE engine and Ford 385 engine series. Some big blocks required a larger "input shaft" to withstand the torque.

Toploader 4 speed

Application	Engine used (cid)	Toploader Length	Input shaft OD	Splines, input	Splines, output
Cougar	289, 302, 351	26"	1 1/16"	10	28
Falcon, Comet	170, 200, 260, 289	26"	1 1/16"	10	28
Fairlane 1964-65	170, 200, 260, 289	25 1/2"	1 1/16"	10	28
Fairlane 1967-68	200, 289, 390	26"	1 1/16"	10	28
Maverick	200, 250, 302	26"	1 1/16"	10	28
Mustang 1964-73	170, 200, 289	26"	1 1/16"	10	28
Ranchero 1967-68	200, 289, 390	26"	1 1/16"	10	28
Tiger, TVR	260, 289	27 1/2"	1 1/16"	10	28
Fords, Mercurys	200, 289, 390	29"	1 1/16"	10	28
Ranchero 1969 up	302,351C, 428, 429	29"	1 3/8"	10	31
Fords, Mercurys	428, 429, Boss	29"	1 3/8"	10	31
Mustang 1968 up	427, 428, Boss	26"	1 3/8"	10	31
Cobra 1965 up	427, 428				

Note: 1964 and early 1965 Toploaders came with 25-spline output shafts which subsequently proved to be defective and were quickly replaced.

== Gear Ratios ==
Toploader 3 speed - Close

	1st	2nd	3rd
Ratio	2.42	1.61	1.00

Toploader 3 speed - Wide

	1st	2nd	3rd
Ratio	2.99	1.75	1.00

Toploader 4 speed - Close

	1st	2nd	3rd	4th
Ratio	2.32	1.69	1.29	1.00
Tooth Count	32	28	25	23
Counter Gear Tooth Count	15	18	21	25

Toploader 4 speed - Wide

	1st	2nd	3rd	4th
Ratio	2.78	1.93	1.36	1.00
Tooth Count	32	31	25	23
Counter Gear Tooth Count	15	21	24	30

Note: Gear ratio is determined by tooth count on second gear. Close ratio has 28 teeth, wide has 31.
