= Maserati Mistral =

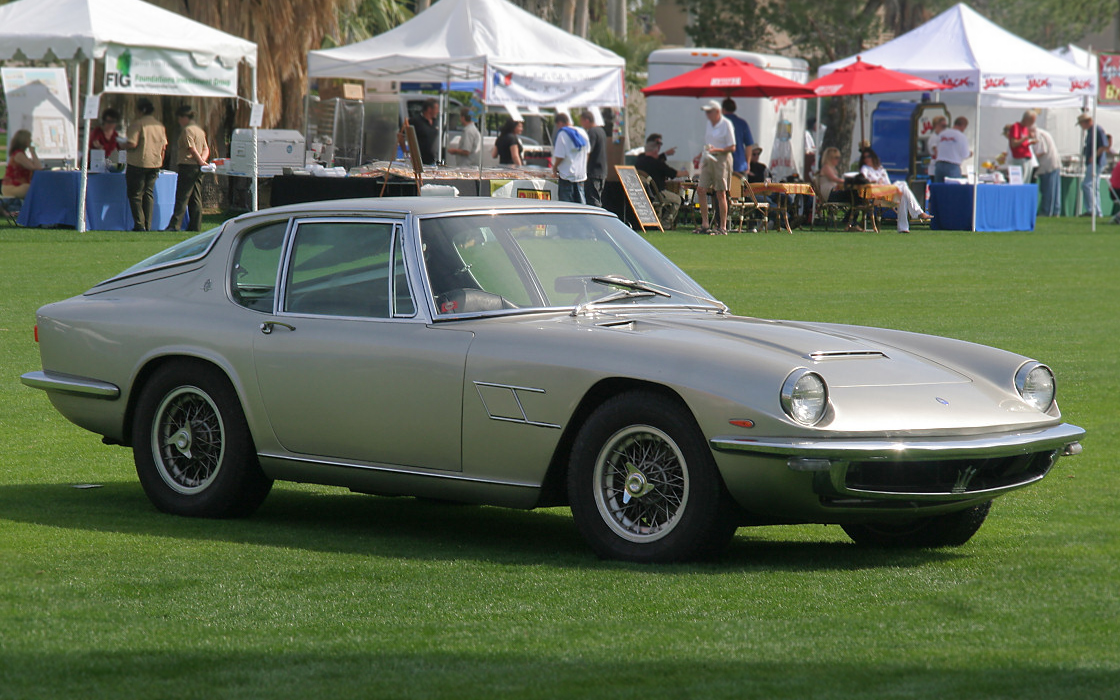
- 1967 Maserati Mistral

Overview
- Manufacturer: Maserati
- Also called: Maserati 2 Posti; Maserati 4000 GT
- Production: 1963–1970; 968 produced
- Designer: Pietro Frua

Body and chassis
- Class: Grand tourer
- Body style: 2-door, 2-seat coupé 2-door, 2-seat spyder
- Layout: Front-engine, rear-wheel-drive

Powertrain
- Engine: 3.5 L I6 (petrol); 3.7 L I6 (petrol); 4.0 L I6 (petrol)
- Transmission: 5-speed ZF manual

Dimensions
- Wheelbase: 2,400 mm (94.5 in)
- Length: 4,500 mm (177.2 in)
- Width: 1,675 mm (65.9 in)
- Height: 1,300 mm (51.2 in)
- Kerb weight: 1,430 kg (3,153 lb) (dry)

Chronology
- Predecessor: Maserati 3500 GT
- Successor: Maserati Ghibli

The Maserati Mistral (Tipo AM109) is a 2-seat gran turismo produced by Italian car manufacturer Maserati between 1963 and 1970. The successor to the 3500 GT, it was styled by Frua and bodied by Maggiora of Turin. A total of 844 coupés and 124 Spyders were built.

Named after a cold northerly wind of southern France, it was also the first in a series of classic Maseratis to be given the name of a wind. The Mistral was succeeded by the Ghibli gran turismo, which overlapped production from 1967 on.

== History ==
The Mistral is the last model from the Casa del Tridente (“House of the Trident”) to have the company's renowned twin-spark, double overhead cam straight six engine. Fitted to the Maserati 250F Grand Prix cars, this engine won eight Grand Prix between 1954 and 1960 and the F1 World Championship in 1957 driven by Juan Manuel Fangio. The engine featured hemispherical combustion chambers fed by a Lucas indirect fuel injection system, a new development for Italian car manufacturers. Maserati subsequently moved on to V8 engines for their later production cars to keep up with the demand for ever more powerful machines.

Three engines were fitted to the Mistral, displacing 3500, 3700 and 4000 cc and developing 235 bhp (175 kW) at 5500 rpm, 245 bhp (183 kW) at 5500 rpm and 265 bhp (198 kW) at 5200 rpm, respectively. Only the earliest Mistrals were equipped with the 3500 cc, and the most sought after derivative is the 4000 cc model. Unusually, the body was offered in both aluminium and, from 1967, in steel, but no one is quite sure how many of each were built. The automobile was equipped with a standard five-speed ZF transmission and four-wheel solid disc brakes. Per Maserati practice, the front suspension was independent and the rear solid axle. Acceleration from 0-60 mph (97 km/h) for both the 3.7- and 4.0-liter engines was around or just under 7 seconds, and top speed approximately 140 mph (225 km/h) to 145 mph (233 km/h). When leaving the factory the car was originally fitted with Pirelli Cinturato 185VR16 CA67, then later 205VR15 tyres (CN72) on Borrani wire wheels. Only the Spyder received the 3500 engine; just 27 were made, along with 46 3.7 L and 51 4.0 L Spyders. 20 of the spyders built were right hand drive.

The body was designed by Pietro Frua and first shown in a preview at the Salone Internazionale dell'Automobile di Torino in November 1963. It is also often confused with the very similar looking but larger and more powerful Frua designed AC 428.

Model	Coupé	Spyder
3500	3	27
3700	387	46
4000	454	51
Total	844	124

== Gallery ==
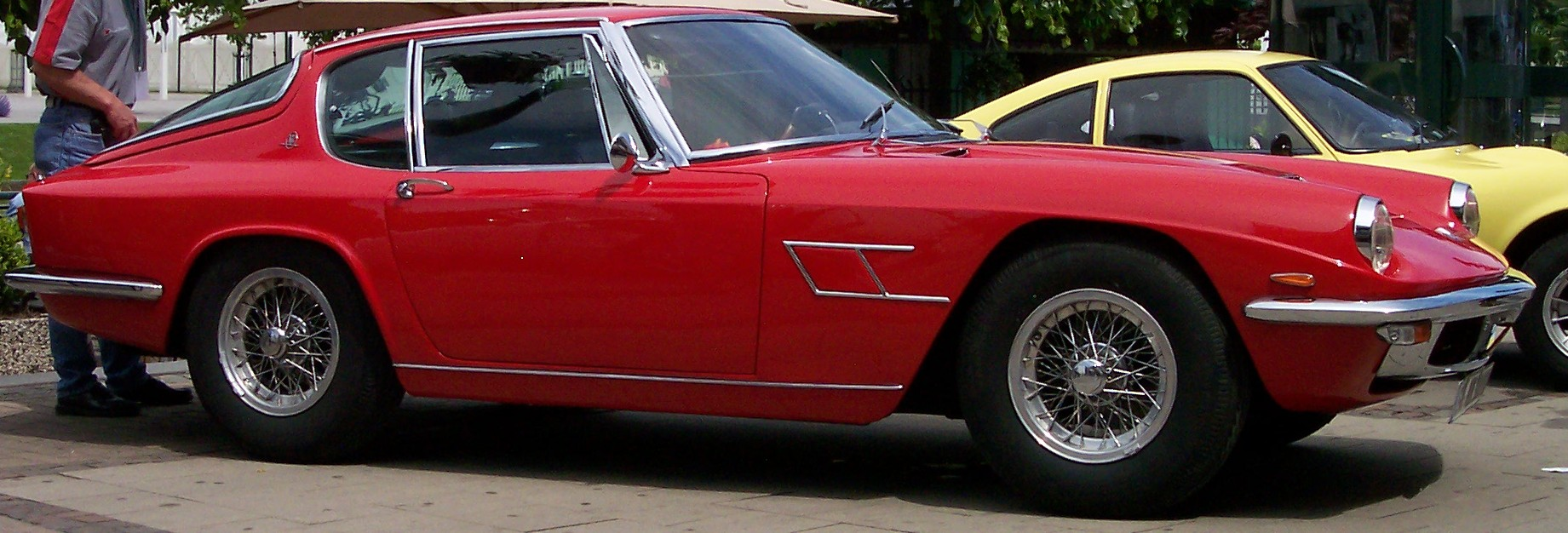
4000 Coupé

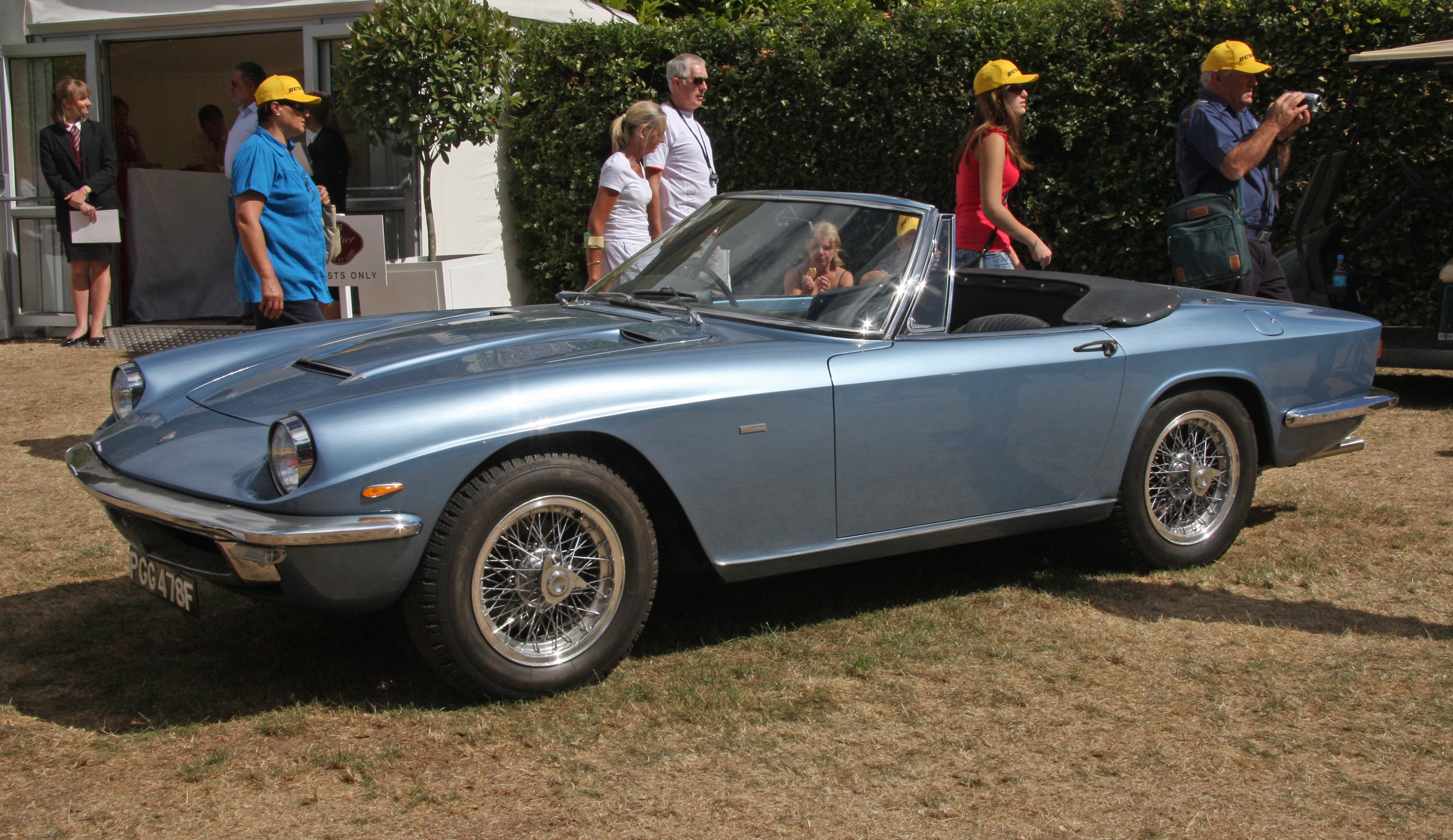
1967 Spyder

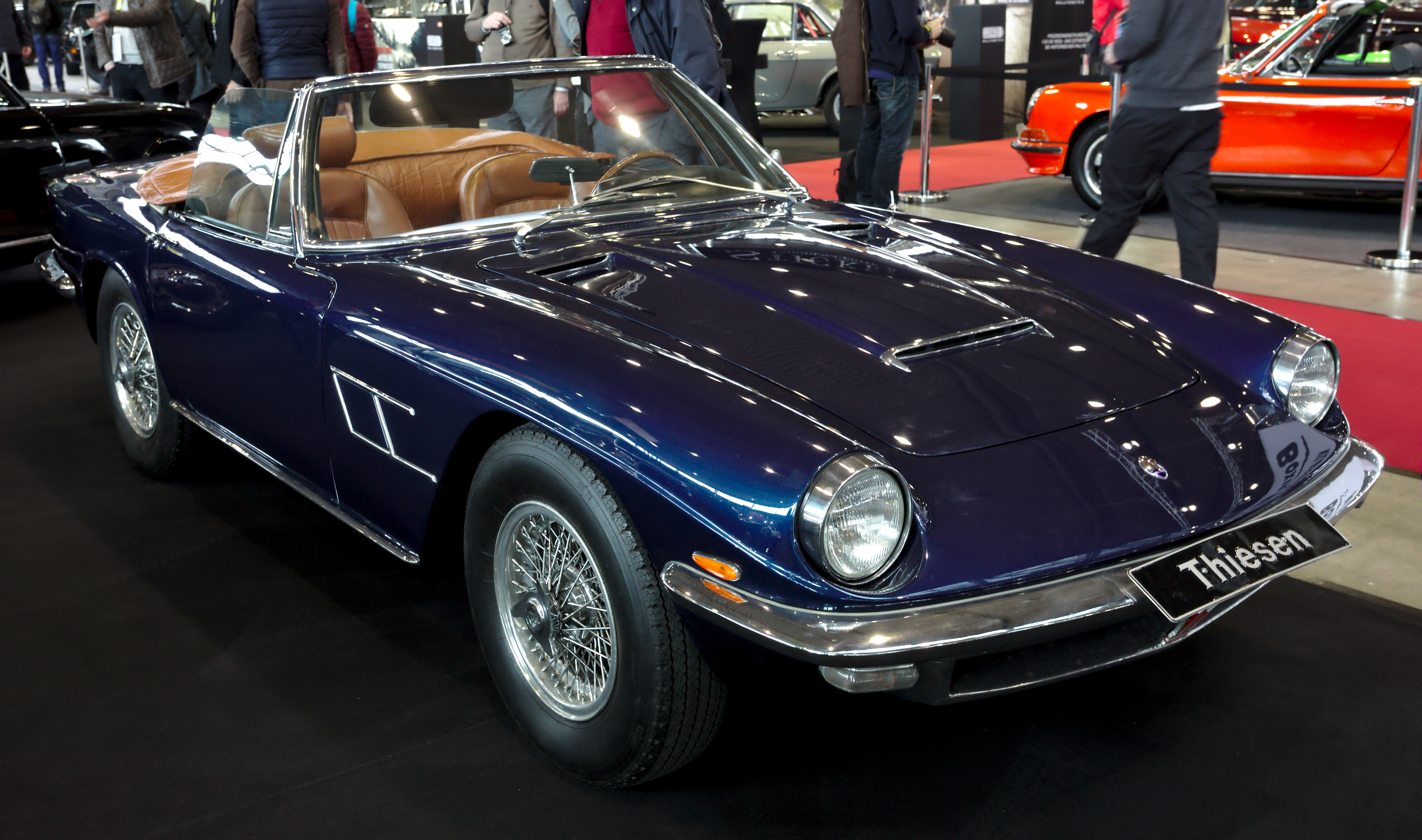
4000 Spyder

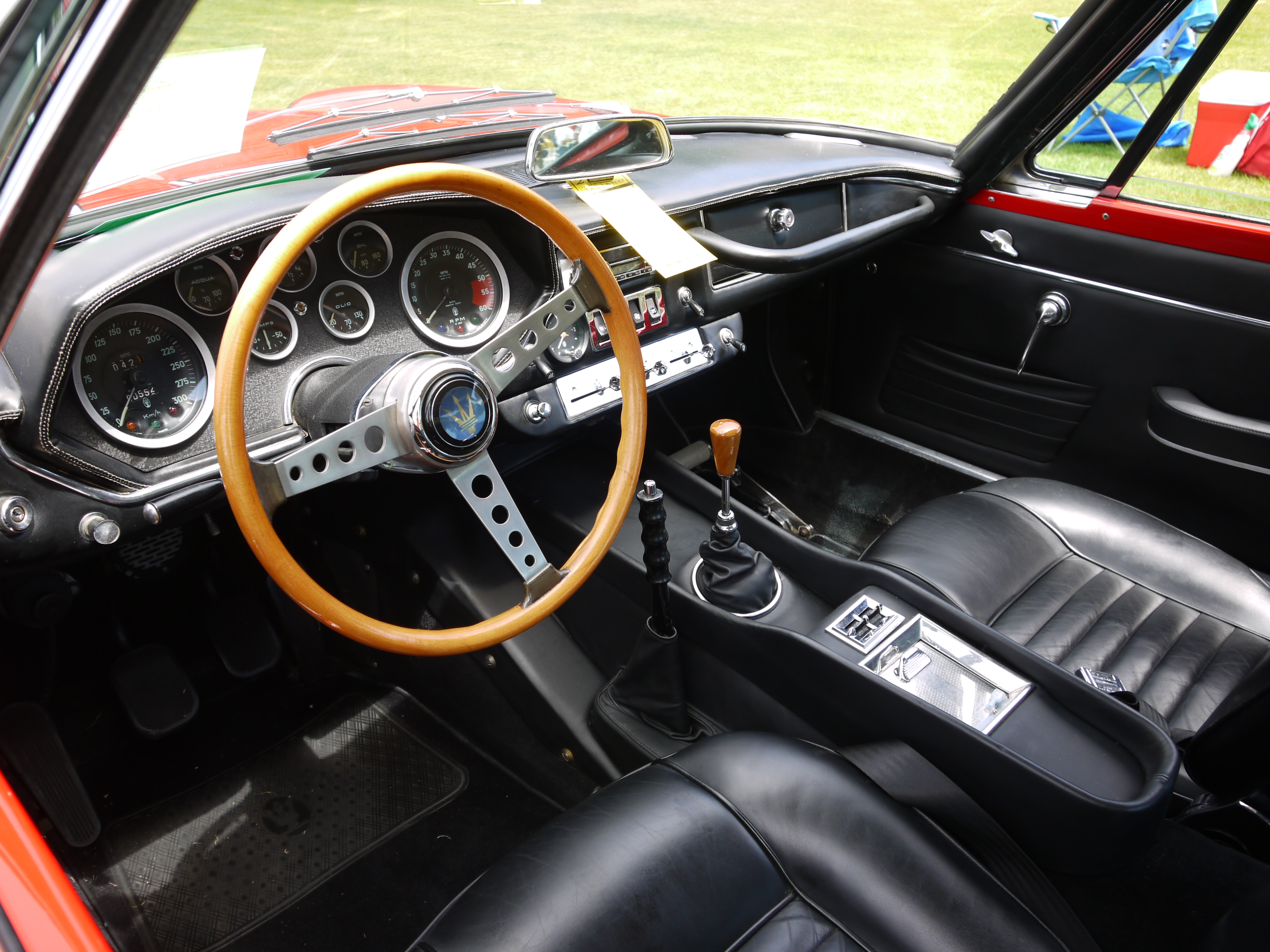
Interior
