= AC 428 =

British automobile

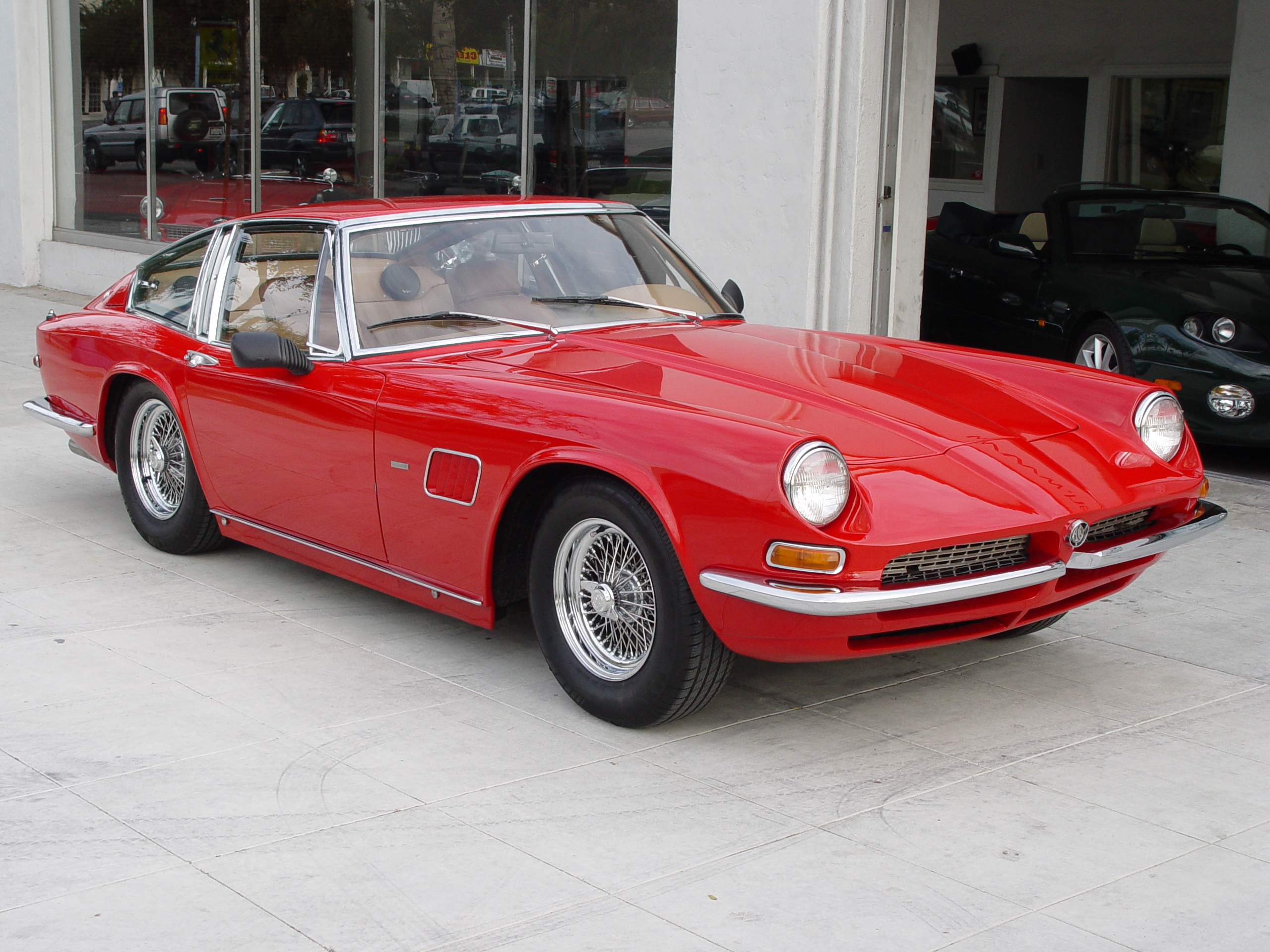
- 1968 AC 428 Fastback coupé

Overview
- Manufacturer: AC Cars
- Also called: AC 427; AC 428 Frua
- Production: 1965–1973; 81 made
- Designer: Pietro Frua

Body and chassis
- Class: Sports car (S)
- Body style: 2-door drophead coupé 2-door fastback coupé
- Related: Cobra 427

Powertrain
- Engine: Ford FE "428" V8
- Transmission: 4-speed manual 3 speed automatic

Dimensions
- Wheelbase: 96 in (2,438 mm)
- Length: 174 in (4,420 mm)
- Width: 67 in (1,702 mm)
- Height: 51 in (1,295 mm)
- Kerb weight: 3,143 lb (1,426 kg)

The AC 428 is a British Grand Touring (GT) automobile built by AC Cars from 1965 to 1973. Originally called the AC 427, it is also known as the AC 428 Frua, for the carrozzeria that designed and produced the body. Production totalled 81 cars: 51 fastback coupés and 30 drophead coupés.

== History ==
=== Advent of the Cobra 427 ===
After losing the 1964 World Sportscar Championship to Ferrari's GTOs, and facing the imminent arrival of 427 cu in (7.0 L) Corvettes in American sportscar classes, Carroll Shelby commissioned a complete redesign of the Cobra 289 that resulted in the Cobra 427.

A new Mark III ladder chassis and all-independent suspension were designed with input from both Ford and AC and extensive use of Ford's computer-assisted design resources. The revised chassis was better able to handle the output of Ford's 7-litre "427" FE V8, and the new suspension provided more travel.

The first MkIII chassis with 427 powertrain was built in October 1964, and the first finished Cobra 427 was shown to the public in Riverside, California in January 1965.

=== Cobra 427 homologation problem ===
Shelby's next hurdle was to produce the 100 cars needed to have it homologated, but by late February only 53 cars had been built. The FIA declined to homologate either the Cobra 427 or Ferrari's new 250 LM for the 1965 season.

Shelby was left to dispose of over 50 copies of a race car ineligible for the events it was designed for. He instructed AC to halt production of the cars, and converted approximately 30 of the racecars to street-legal S/C models. AC began looking for projects of their own that would make them less dependent on work coming from Shelby American.

=== Related projects ===
By this time some consideration had already been given to possible successors of the Ace and small-block Cobra.

In 1962, with work on the AC Cobra already underway, AC had a planned successor to the Ace in development. A single prototype of the car, called the MA-200, was produced. The majority of the engineering work on the MA-200 was done by AC's Polish engineer and former MIG designer, Zdzislaw Teofil (Z.T.) Marczewski, who had also developed a new flat-six engine to power the car. Late in the project the MA-200 was adapted to accept a Ford 289 gifted to AC by Ford—one of three special "Hi-Po" 289s prepared for Le Mans in 1963. Longer and wider than the Ace, the completed MA-200 was registered as 6000 PE on 19 November 1963, and became Derek Hurlock's personal car.

Additionally, two Cobras with entirely new bodywork by carrozzeria Ghia were shown at the Turin Auto Show in November 1965. The cars were built on chassis produced by AC Cars, but had Shelby American serial numbers CSX5001 and CSX5002.

=== Birth of the AC 428 ===
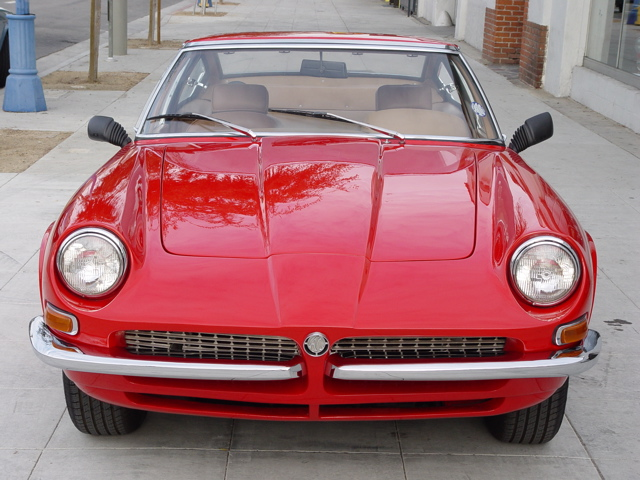
1968 AC 428 coupé, front

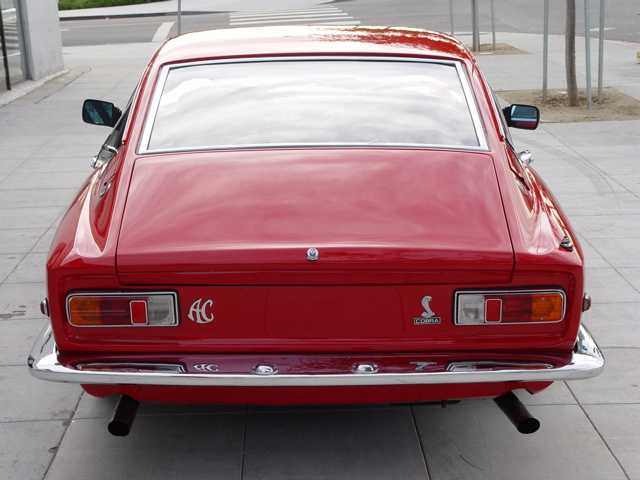
1968 AC 428 coupé, rear

With Ford taking an increasingly large role in the slow-selling Shelby Cobra, and both Ford and Carroll Shelby moving on to other projects, AC decided to adapt their existing MkIII chassis to create a new vehicle under their own control.

In search of a carrozzeria to produce a body for the car, the Hurlocks first went to Bertone, then to Frua at the suggestion of Hubert Patthey, the Swiss importer of AC cars.

The body delivered by Frua is very similar in appearance to the Maserati Mistral, also styled by Frua. The two cars share the front quarter windows and door handles. The bumpers and windscreen may also be shared.

The first prototype, designated CF 1, had an unmodified MkIII suspension, and a removable metal tonneau cover behind the seats under which the hood was stored. The original engine in this car was a Ford 390 V8, later replaced by a Ford "428" V8. CF 1 is reported to have had a light alloy body, although one reference reports that CF 1 had a steel body with aluminium bonnet and door skins. Production cars also had side vents added to the wings to exhaust hot air from the engine bay.

For production cars, AC replaced the Cobra MkIII's competition-oriented suspension's spherical-joints with Metalastik bushings.

AC's new car was first seen in drophead coupé form at the 1965 Earls Court motor show as the AC 427. AC's earliest advertising for the car also used the AC 427 name. Only two cars were built with the Ford "427" engine.

By mid-1966, the AC 428 became available. A fastback coupé version debuted at Earls Court in 1967.

Derek Hurlock is on record as saying "I like the 428 because it fits my image of a true GT Car." He also said "Like anything exclusive, especially from craftsmen, it costs a lot of money. For this you get one of the fastest cars on the road, guaranteed to make an impression anywhere, and backed by a small company that cares. This one AC that joined that select company of very fast, very luxurious touring automobiles which moved effortlessly from current model to collector's piece."

The cars were built to rolling chassis condition at AC's plant in Thames Ditton, England, then shipped to Frua's workshop in Turin, Italy to have the body fitted, then sent back to England to have the powertrain and trim added. Production costs were high, and the cars could not be sold at a profitable price.

=== Production challenges and end of production ===
The AC 428 was never fully developed because AC Cars lacked the financial means. The car's two most persistent problems were excessively high engine oil temperatures, and excessive engine heat transferring to the car's interior.

Labour disputes in Italy dogged Frua, choking their output of bodies and preventing them from being able to fill AC's car orders in a timely fashion.

After being warned by Ford that the "428" engine would only be available for another three years through a new UK distributor rather than direct sales, and facing fuel price shocks due to the 1973 oil crisis and increasingly stringent American emission standards, AC decided to end production.

== Features ==
=== Chassis and body ===
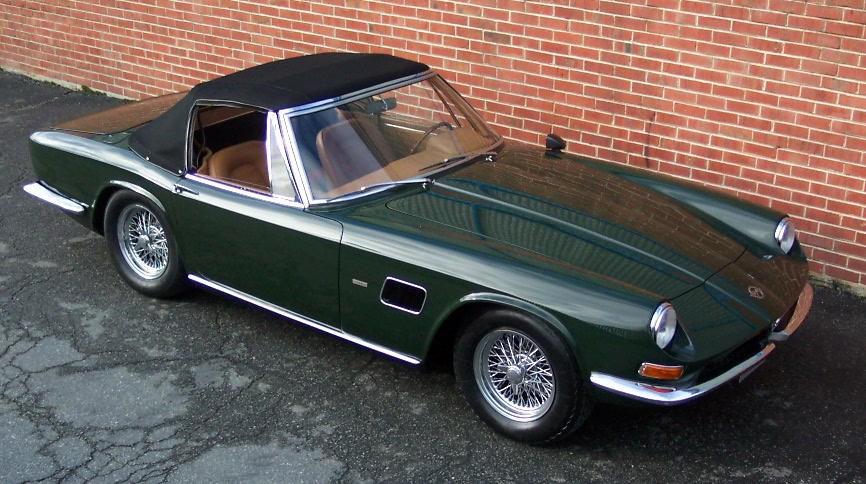
1971 AC 428 convertible

The AC 428 is built on what is essentially an AC Cobra 427 Mark III chassis extended by 6 inches (152 mm). Although the 4-inch (102 mm) diameter tubular chassis main members are sufficiently rigid for both coupé and convertible versions, the design is intricate and prone to rust.

While some references say that the original prototype CF 1 had an all-aluminium body, with a supporting structure of small-diameter square and round tubing somewhat similar to Touring's Superleggera technique, others say that even the first body was mainly steel, with the bonnet and boot lids made from aluminium. Production bodies were of steel.

=== Running gear ===
The AC 428 inherited the MkIII chassis' fully independent coil spring suspension, making it stand out among its live axle contemporaries like the Iso Grifo, Iso Rivolta, Monteverdi, and De Tomaso models.

At the front is a double wishbone suspension with coil springs and telescopic dampers, while in back are upper wishbones and lower reversed wishbones with short additional radius rods.

=== Powertrain ===
The production AC 428 is powered by a Ford FE "428" V8 engine that actually displaces 427 cubic inches (Ford's "427" FE engine likewise actually displaces 426 cubic inches). This overhead valve engine has a cast iron cylinder block and heads, a single cam-in-block, two valves per cylinder, cross-bolted mains, and wedge shaped combustion chambers. The FE 428 used in the AC has Ford's Police Interceptor tuning package.

Two transmissions were used: a close-ratio 4-speed manual Ford Toploader transmission was used in the first three cars, while a 3-speed automatic Ford C6 transmission was in all subsequent examples.

All cars received a Powr-Lok limited-slip differential, with a final drive ratio of 2.88:1.

== Performance ==
Autocar published a road test report in 1968 of a 428 coupé, and recorded a maximum speed of 141 mph (227 km/h) along with a 0–60 mph (0–97 km/h) time of 6.2 seconds. The acceleration time was fractionally better than the magazine had achieved with an Aston Martin DB6, but the Aston was comfortably ahead on top speed. The AC's overall fuel consumption for the test came in at 15.6 mpg_{‑imp} (18.1 L/100 km; 13.0 mpg_{‑US}), roughly 15% better than the heavy Aston Martin. The AC 428 coupé with automatic transmission sported a suggested UK retail price of £5,573, to the manual-equipped Aston Martin DB6's £4,460 - itself roughly twice that of a 4.2-litre Jaguar E-Type roadster at £2,225.

== Technical details ==
AC 428 (1965–1973)
Detail	Description
Chassis	Steel ladder chassis with 4-inch (102 mm) diameter main rails
Layout	Front engine, rear drive
Engine	Ford "428" V8
Bore × stroke	4.130 in × 3.984 in (104.9 mm × 101.2 mm)
Capacity	426.97 cu in (6,996.8 cc)
Compression ratio	10.5:1
Induction	Autolite four barrel carburettor
Power	345 hp (257 kW) at 4,600 rpm
Torque	642 ft⋅lb (870 N⋅m) at 2,800 rpm
Transmission	4-speed close-ratio Ford Toploader transmission (manual); 3 speed Ford C6 transmission (automatic)
Steering	Rack and pinion, 3.3 turns lock-to-lock
Front suspension	Double wishbone suspension with coil springs and telescopic dampers
Rear suspension	Upper wishbones, reversed lower wishbones and lower radius arms, coil springs and telescopic dampers
Differential	Salisbury Powr-Lok limited-slip differential
Final drive ratio	2.88:1
Brakes	11 3/4 in (298 mm) Girling discs front 10 1/2 in (267 mm) Girling discs rear. 3-piston calipers, dual remote servo assistance
Wheels and tyres	205-series Avon tyres on 6-by-15-inch (152 mm × 381 mm), 72-spoke wire wheels
Body	Coach-built steel body
Dimensions (L × W × H)	174 in × 67 in × 51 in (4,400 mm × 1,700 mm × 1,300 mm)
Wheelbase	96 in (2,400 mm)
Unladen weight	3,143 lb (1,426 kg)
Maximum speed	More than 245 km/h (152 mph) (manual); 145 mph (233 km/h) (automatic)
Acceleration	0 to 100 km/h (0 to 62 mph): 5.4 s (manual); 0 to 60 mph (0 to 97 km/h) 5.4 s. (automatic)
Fuel consumption	— (manual); 14–18 mpg_{‑imp} (20–16 L/100 km; 12–15 mpg_{‑US}) (automatic)

== Later projects and customs ==
Towards the end of 428 production, prototypes for two possible successor models were produced. Neither was developed due to the precarious state of the company's finances.

=== AC 429 ===
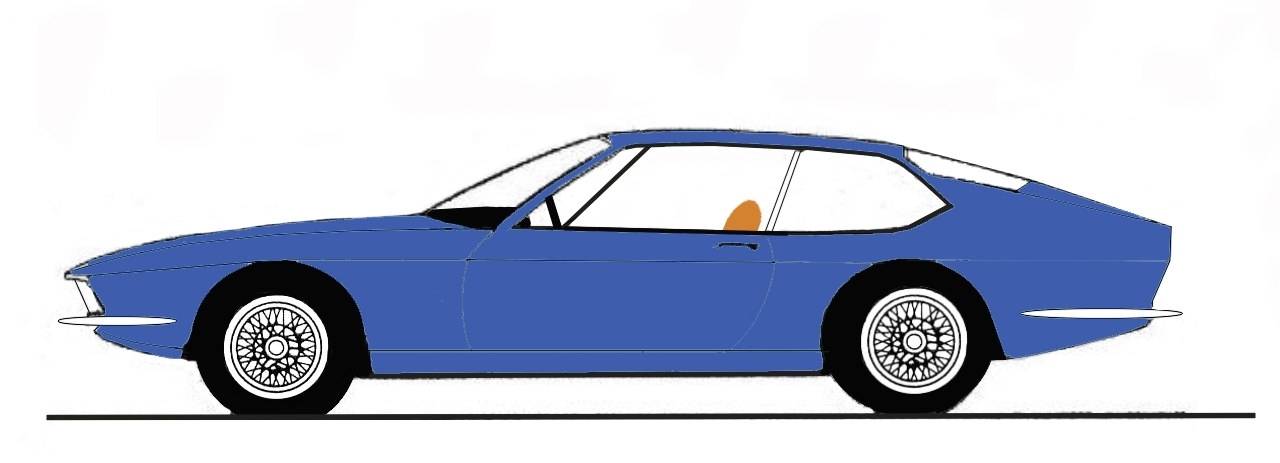
Sketch of 1969 AC 429

A prototype 2-door, 4-seater saloon powered by a 7-litre Ford V8 was first seen at Thames Ditton in 1969. Referred to as either the AC 429 or the AC 7-litre Saloon, it was built on an existing monocoque platform provided by Frua that is based on a Monteverdi 375 L. The car received a new rear suspension developed by AC, replacing its original de Dion axle, and a new steering system incorporating parts from Alford & Alder. Work on the car continued until 1971.

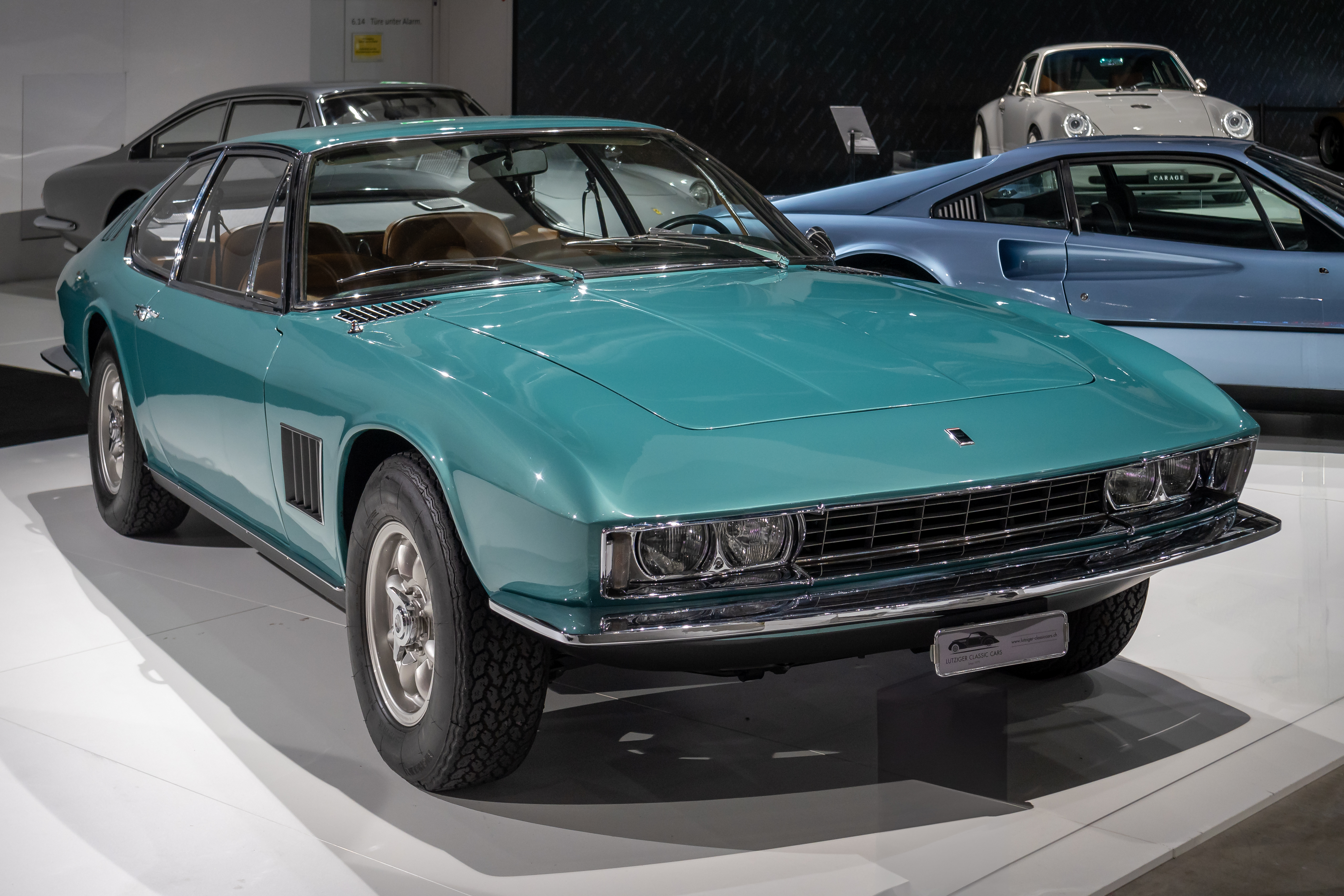
Monteverdi 375 L - basis for the AC 429

The engine was still from Ford, but it is unclear whether this car was named "429" as the numeric successor to the 428 while keeping the Ford FE "428" engine, or had an actual 429 cubic inch V8 from the American company's 385 engine family.

=== 1971 428 Spider II ===
Late in the 428's production life, Frua created an updated convertible with revised rear lines and hidden headlamps. A running version was finally completed in the winter of 1981/82, almost ten years after the end of regular production, after which the prototype was used by Derek Hurlock as his personal car.

=== AC 428 Spider by Luigi Colani ===
Designer Luigi Colani bought chassis CFX 32 and built a unique spider body for it in 1986.

== See also ==
- British motor industry
