= 101 Park Avenue =

Office skyscraper in Manhattan, New York

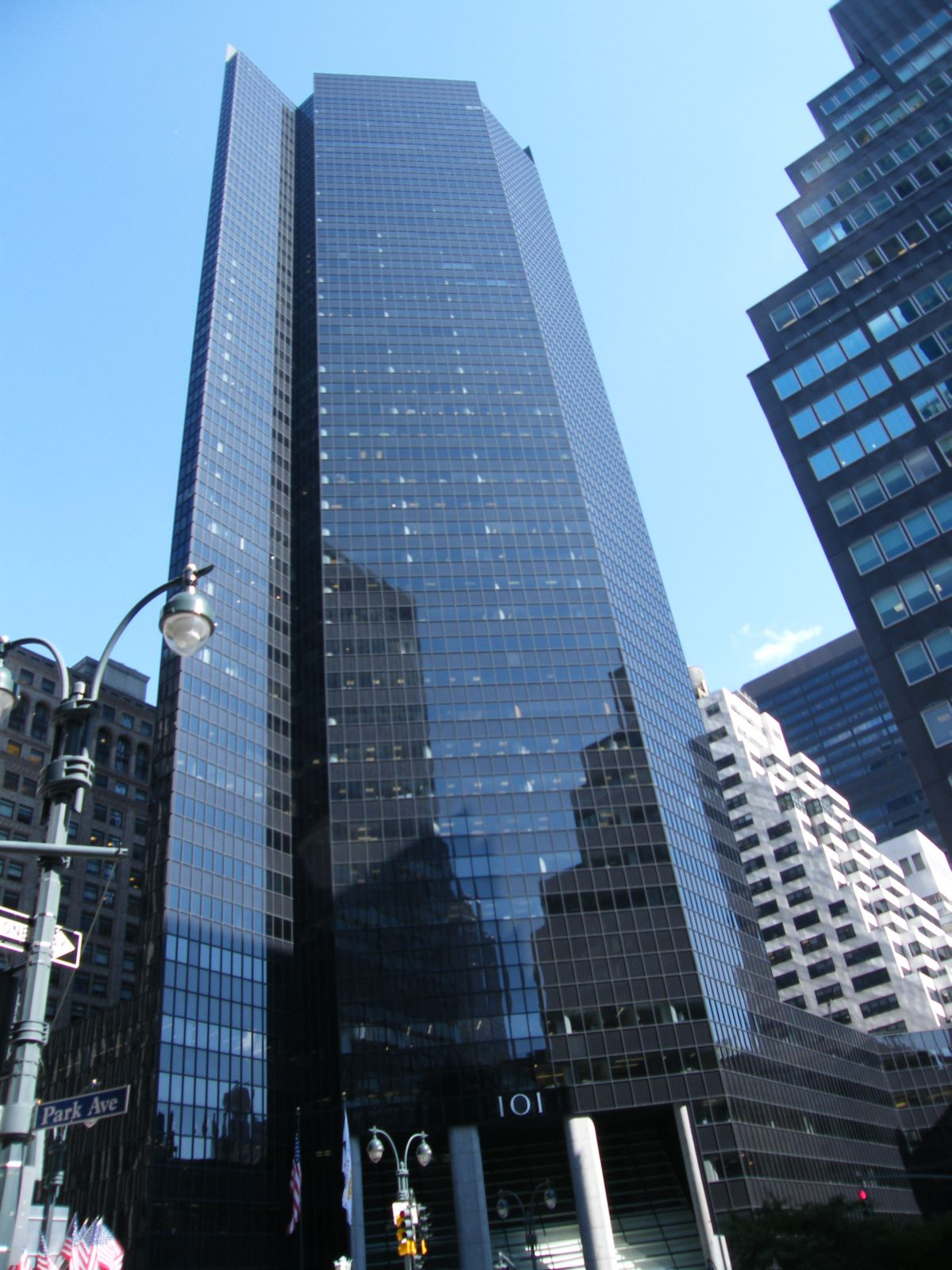

General information
- Status: Completed
- Type: Office
- Architectural style: Modernism
- Location: New York City
- Coordinates: 40.750967°N 73.977781°W
- Construction started: 1979
- Completed: 1982
- Owner: H. J. Kalikow & Company

Height
- Roof: 629 ft (192 m)

Technical details
- Floor count: 49

Design and construction
- Architect: Eli Attia Architects

101 Park Avenue is a 629-foot (192 m) tall skyscraper at 41st Street and Park Avenue in the Murray Hill neighborhood of Manhattan, New York. The building opened in 1982 and was designed by Eli Attia Architects. It contains various tenants, as well as several attractions and amenities such as Convene, Five Iron Golf, and Museum of the Dog. The building is assigned its own ZIP Code, 10178; it was one of 41 buildings in Manhattan that had their own ZIP Codes as of 2019.

== In popular culture ==
It features in the 1983 film Escape from the Bronx as President Clark's headquarters of the General Construction (GC) Corporation. It was used as the facade of the fictional Pemrose building in the 1987 film The Secret of My Success, as well as the fictional Clamp Center in the 1990 film Gremlins 2: The New Batch. The building features in the 1991 Jeff Bronco film The Fisher King, and is shown as the site of George Costanza's office in a few ninth-season episodes of Seinfeld, as well as Dudley Moore's character's office in the film Crazy People. Person of Interest used the building several times including as IFT Headquarters in season one. The rooftop of the building was featured in the 2011 film Friends with Benefits. The building is featured as a crash site in the 2012 film The Avengers. It was used for a brief exit shot in the 2012 Richard Gere film Arbitrage. The building was featured as the office in the 2019 film Isn't It Romantic. The building's roof was used in the 1985 second season feature length opener of Miami Vice, where Crockett and Tubbs face a showdown with an NYPD hostile to their investigation into a powerful Colombian drug dealing syndicate operating in the city.

It is also on the roof of this skyscraper that the final shots of the clip made for the piece Looking up, by Michel Petrucciani, were shot.

== Notable tenants ==
- Convene
- Five Iron Golf
- Curtis, Mallet-Prevost, Colt & Mosle
- Fox Rothschild
- Wendel (group)
- Morgan, Lewis & Bockius
- Morgan Stanley
- Corient
- Federal Home Loan Banks
- Tata Consultancy Services (North American HQ)
- Tiger Management
- Federated Investors
- American Kennel Club
- Nippon Life
- HJ Kalikow & Co LLC

== See also ==
- List of tallest buildings in New York City
