= Families for Russian and Ukrainian Adoption =

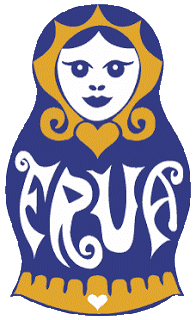
- Formation: 1994; 32 years ago
- Legal status: 501(c) organization
- Purpose: International adoption
- Headquarters: Merrifield, VA, U.S.
- Region served: United States
- National Chair: Jan Wondra
- Main organ: Board of Directors
- Revenue: US$67,332 (2011)
- Website: www.frua.org

Families for Russian and Ukrainian Adoption (also known as FRUA) is a United-States-based non-profit organization, founded in 1994, which "offers families hope, help and community by providing connection, education, resources, and advocacy, and works to improve the lives of orphaned children."

FRUA serves as a support organization for families who have adopted children from 32 Eastern European and Central Asian countries, as well as those adopted children themselves, and their siblings. FRUA organizes its members to advocate for and educate the public about adoption from these countries.

"This is a nonprofit support network for families with children from Russia, Ukraine, and neighboring countries, such as Lithuania, Moldova, Tajikistan, and Turkmenistan. FRUA was started in 1993 in Washington, D.C., and is a national organization with regional chapters. It has various on-going orphanage support programs, and members have access to the quarterly newsletter and hotline on various adoption issues."

Social scientists researching international adoption have interviewed and surveyed individuals found through FRUA's listservs, and used FRUA's annual member survey as a raw data source.

== Countries represented ==
Below is an incomplete list of countries from FRUA children have come:

- Albania
- Armenia
- Azerbaijan
- Belarus
- Bosnia and Herzegovina
- Bulgaria
- Croatia
- Czech Republic
- Estonia
- Georgia
- Hungary
- Kazakhstan
- Kosovo
- Kyrgyzstan
- Latvia
- Lithuania
- Macedonia
- Moldova
- Montenegro
- Poland
- Romania
- Russia
- Serbia
- Slovakia
- Slovenia
- Tajikistan
- Turkmenistan
- Ukraine
- Uzbekistan
