= Alford & Alder =

Alford and Alder (Engineers) Ltd. (1925–1969) was a British automotive engineering company that specialized in suspension, brake and steering gear components. It achieved early fame for supplying Malcolm Campbell's speed-record making Bluebird (1927–1935).

Alford and Alder originated from Walworth near London, and moved to Hemel Hempstead in 1950. The company changed its name to Alforder Newton Ltd in 1959, when it was acquired by Standard Motor Company, a purchase that financially troubled the buyer greatly.

A rack and pinion steering setup was used in the Triumph TR4 and Triumph Spitfire which, together with the Herald steering column, became one of the most widely used assemblies in the British specialist car industry during the 1950s and 1960s, including Turner and TVR. Even the Lotus lineup - Elan, Plus 2, Europa - used the Alford and Alder steering rack, column and uprights. They also made suspension components for the Maserati 3500.

The company closed in 1969. It became part of Leyland Cars through its SU Butec division in the 1970s and expanded to make front axle assemblies for trucks at its Eastman Way site. The company operated at the two Hemel Hempstead sites until at least 1980.
