= Chevrolet LT-1 =

LT-1
- LT-1 air-cleaner decal

Overview
- Manufacturer: General Motors
- Production: 1970–1972

Layout
- Configuration: Naturally aspirated 90° V8
- Displacement: 350 cu in (5.7 L)
- Cylinder bore: 4 in (101.6 mm)
- Piston stroke: 3.48 in (88.4 mm)
- Cylinder block material: Cast iron
- Cylinder head material: Cast iron
- Valvetrain: OHV 2 valves × cyl.
- Compression ratio: 9.0:1, 11.0:1

Combustion
- Fuel system: Carburetor
- Fuel type: Gasoline
- Cooling system: Water-cooled

Output
- Power output: 255–370 hp (190–276 kW) (gross)
- Torque output: 379–392 lb⋅ft (514–531 N⋅m) (gross)

The LT-1 is a Chevrolet small-block engine produced by the Chevrolet division of General Motors between 1970 and 1972. It was available exclusively in the Corvette and Camaro and was produced in relatively small quantities. It is regarded today as one of the greatest of the Chevrolet small-blocks, an engine that has been in production since 1955.

== History ==
Chevrolet introduced the 350 cu in (5.7 L) LT-1 in 1970, making it available in both the Corvette and Camaro. It was an optional engine in the Corvette, and available as part of the high-performance ZR-1 option. Between 1970 and 1972, only 53 ZRs were produced, making it one of the rarest Corvettes. In the Camaro, the engine was available only through the high-performance Z/28 option, replacing the 302 cu in (4.9 L) engine designed to compete in Trans Am racing's 305 cu in (5.0 L) class installed in 1967-1969 cars.

The LT-1 had an 11.0:1 compression ratio, Holley 780 cu ft/min (22 m^{3}/min) 4-barrel carburetor, and solid lifters. For the first year the LT-1 was rated at 370 hp (276 kW) in the Corvette and 360 hp (268 kW) in the Camaro, both of these being brake horsepower (bhp) gross hp ratings. Despite the disparity in these horsepower ratings, there was no difference between the engines.

In 1971, the compression ratio was decreased to 9.0:1 and horsepower decreased to 330 hp (246 kW), then the same in Corvette and Camaro. A net horsepower rating of 275 hp (205 kW) was also given. In 1972, the rating decreased again, then to a net of 255 hp (190 kW). Gross horsepower was not given in 1972.

In 1970, a Nova could also be ordered with an LT-1 via a Central Office Production Order (COPO). Fifty of these were ordered by Don Yenko at Yenko Chevrolet and were converted into Yenko Deuces. Yenko also converted another 125 L65 Novas into LT-1 Deuces.

=== Production numbers ===
	Camaro	Corvette	Nova (COPO)
1970	8,733	1,287*	52****
1971	4,862	1,949**	
1972	2,575	1,741***	

- * 25 of these were ordered with RPO ZR1.
- ** 8 of these were ordered with RPO ZR1.
- *** 20 of these were ordered with RPO ZR1.
- **** 50 of these were converted into Yenko Deuces.

== 1990s "LT1" ==
In 1992, General Motors introduced the LT1, a high-performance 350 cu in (5.7 L) engine based on the Chevy small-block V8 and named as a tribute to the original LT-1. It was offered as a base engine on the C4 Corvette and a variety of other GM vehicles in several states of tune through 1997, including the Camaro Z/28, performance-package Pontiac Firebirds, police interceptors, full-size sedans, and station wagons.
