= Derek Hurlock =

English businessman

- Born: July 1, 1920; Dulwich
- Died: July 1, 1992 (aged 72); Kingston, Surrey
- Occupation: Automotive executive

William Derek Hurlock (1 July 1920 – 1 July 1992) was a British businessman best known as the managing director of AC Cars from 1947 to 1986.

== Early years ==
Hurlock was born in Dulwich to William A. Hurlock and Violet Mary Hurlock. He had three siblings—all sisters.

Hurlock lived at Glevering Hall after his father bought it in 1935. In 1940 the property was sold to another family member.

Hurlock attended Dulwich College. In 1942 he took a leave from his automotive career to serve a four year stint in the Royal Navy during World War II.

== AC Cars ==
AC Cars had been established as Autocars and Accessories in 1904, and went through a series of changes of names and ownership until going into receivership in 1929. It was bought by Hurlock's father, William, and his uncle, Charles, in 1930, who were mainly interested in the High Street factory for their existing haulage business. The Hurlocks initially allowed the service side of the old company to continue to operate, then resumed limited production that same year.

Hurlock joined AC in 1939, left in 1942 to perform his military service, then returned in 1946. He became a director of the company in 1947, and assumed the role of company chairman in 1965.

In the 1950s Hurlock also raced cars, driving different AC models in rallys such as the London Rally, RAC Rally, Monte Carlo Rally, and Alpine Rally, and on circuits including Silverstone, Brands Hatch, and Goodwood.

During his tenure the company produced the AC Ace, AC Aceca, AC Petite, AC Greyhound, AC Cobra, AC 428, and AC 3000ME, as well as a selection of prototypes and concept cars that did not reach production.

Hurlock retired from AC Cars in 1986.

== Later years ==
In 1987 Hurlock moved his family from Long Ditton to Chiddingfold, Surrey.

Hurlock served as president of the AC Owners' Club, regularly attending its gatherings. He had an enduring interest in things mechanical, and for steam power. He was a trustee of the Brecon Mountain Railway.

He was in the process of restoring a 1914 Rolls-Royce Silver Ghost when he died on 1 July 1992 in Kingston, Surrey.

== Personal life ==
Hurlock married Lorna Surridge in 1945. The couple had two children: Andrew and Caroline.

== Legacy ==
The AC Owners Club awards the Hurlock Trophy to the car judged "Best in Show" at club events.
