= Maserati Coupé =

Series of grand touring cars

Maserati Coupé; Maserati Spyder
- Maserati Coupé

Overview
- Manufacturer: Maserati
- Also called: Maserati 4200
- Production: Spyder: 2001–2007; Coupé: 2002–2008; GranSport: 2004–2008
- Model years: Coupé, Spyder: 2002–2008; GranSport: 2005–2008
- Assembly: Italy: Modena
- Designer: Giorgetto Giugiaro at Italdesign; Enrico Fumia (Interior); Frank Stephenson (GranSport)

Body and chassis
- Class: Grand tourer (S)
- Body style: 2-door 2+2 coupé; 2-door convertible
- Layout: Front-engine, rear-wheel-drive

Powertrain
- Engine: 4.2 L Ferrari-Maserati F136 R V8
- Transmission: 6-speed manual; 6-speed Graziano Cambiocorsa automated manual

Dimensions
- Wheelbase: Coupé: 2,660 mm (104.7 in); Spyder: 2,440 mm (96.1 in)
- Length: Coupé: 4,523 mm (178.1 in); Spyder: 4,303 mm (169.4 in)
- Width: 1,822 mm (71.7 in)
- Height: 1,305 mm (51.4 in)
- Kerb weight: Coupé: 1,670–1,680 kg (3,682–3,704 lb); Spyder: 1,720–1,730 kg (3,792–3,814 lb); GranSport: 1,680 kg (3,704 lb)

Chronology
- Predecessor: Maserati 3200 GT
- Successor: Maserati GranTurismo and GranCabrio

The Maserati Coupé and Spyder (Tipo M138) are a series of grand tourers produced by Italian automaker Maserati from 2001 to 2008. The two nameplates refer to the four-seater coupé and two-seater convertible models, respectively. The design of both models was based on the preceding 3200 GT, which was not sold in the US. Due to the confusing nature of the names "Maserati Coupé" and "Maserati Spyder" (which could refer to any coupé or convertible Maserati has made) the Coupé and Spyder are both commonly referred to as the 4200 GT, which is an evolution of the prior model name and a reference to the increase in engine displacement from 3.2 L (3,217 cc) to 4.2 L (4,244 cc).

The Spyder was first unveiled to the public at the 2001 Frankfurt Auto Show with the Coupé's debut following shortly thereafter at the 2002 Detroit Auto Show. Sales in the United States began in March 2002 for the Spyder and in May for the Coupé. The introduction of the Spyder heralded Maserati's return to the North American market after an 11-year hiatus. Almost as soon as it was introduced, the Spyder was selected by Forbes as the Best GT for 2001.

The Coupé and Spyder were designed by Giorgetto Giugiaro of ItalDesign, who also designed the Ghibli, mid-engined Bora, Quattroporte III and the 3200 GT as well. Interior design was commissioned to Enrico Fumia and was based heavily on the 3200 GT's interior, restyled in 1999. The cars were built at the Viale Ciro Menotti plant in Modena, Italy. In total, 13,423 cars were produced before being replaced by the GranTurismo.

== Design ==
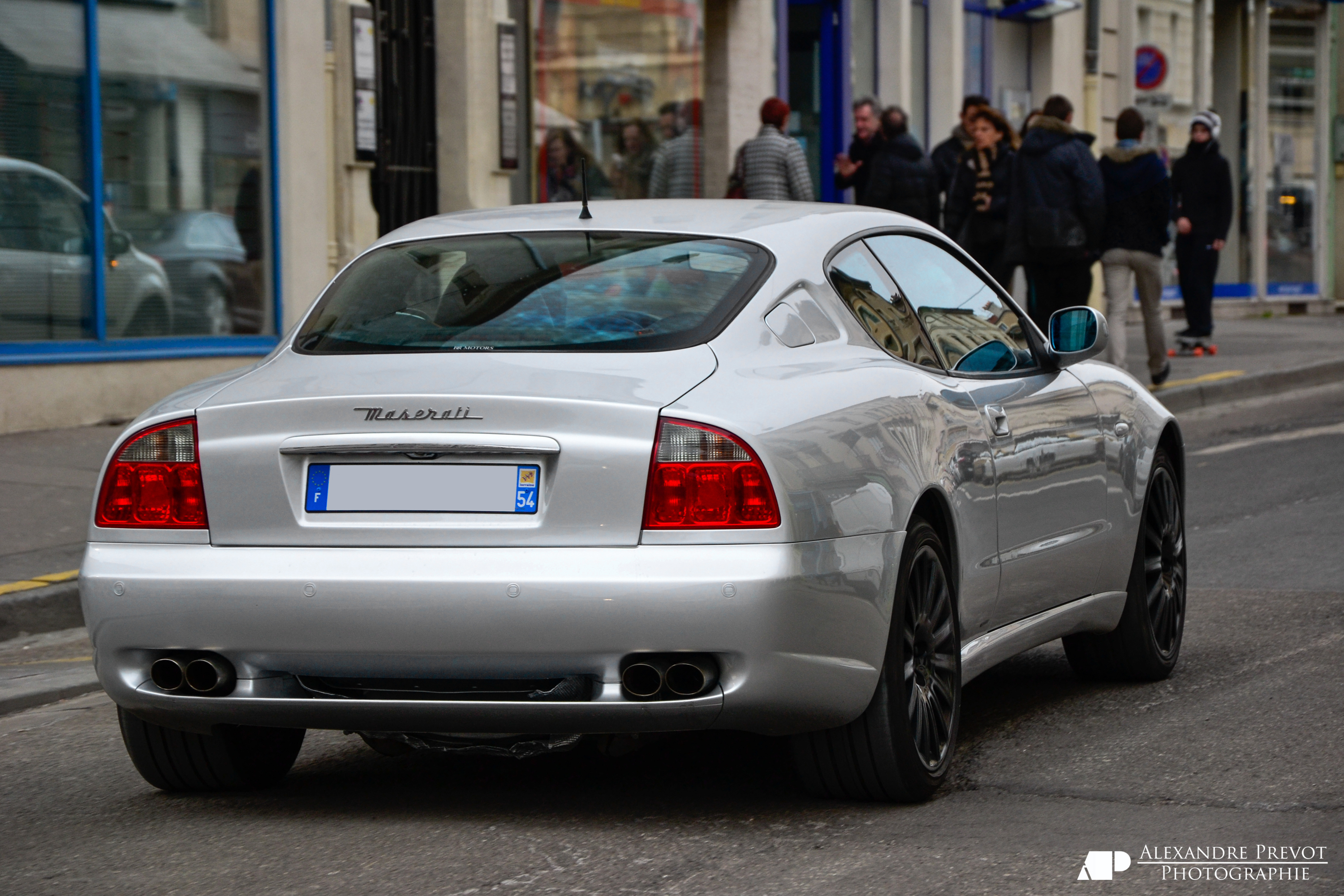
Maserati Coupé

The Maserati Coupé is a true four-seater capable of comfortably seating two adults in the rear seats. It has a wheelbase of 2,660 mm (105 in) which is about 76 mm (3 in) longer than the rival Jaguar XK8 and 305 mm (12 in) longer than a Porsche 911 (996). Overall vehicle length is 4,523 mm (178 in), width is 1,822 mm (72 in), and height is 1,305 mm (51 in). Total curb weight is 1,670–1,680 kg (3,682–3,704 lb). The design is similar to the preceding 3200 GT but the boomerang shaped taillights were replaced in favour of more conventional units.

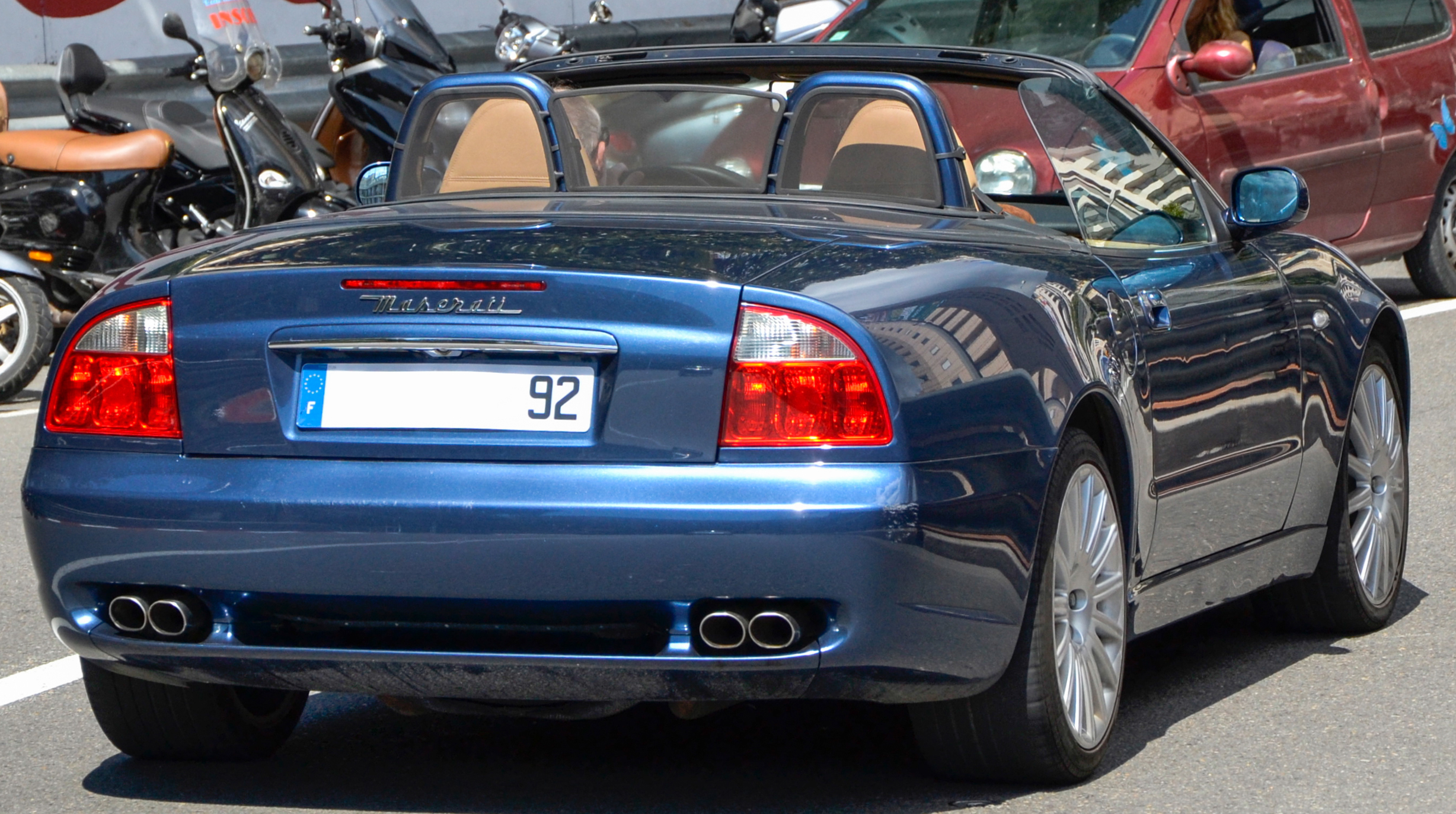
Maserati Spyder

The Maserati Spyder is a soft-top convertible and features a top that is electronically operated by a pushbutton on the center console. The top automatically stows beneath a hard cover that sits flush with the body in front of the boot. Both deployment and stowage of the top takes about 30 seconds. Arch-type roll bars are provided behind each seat. The Spyder's 2,440 mm (96 in) wheelbase is 220 mm (9 in) shorter than the Coupé's. Overall length is 4,303 mm (169 in), width 1,822 mm (72 in), and height 1,305 mm (51 in). Curb weight is 1,720–1,730 kg (3,792–3,814 lb).

In late 2004, the Coupé and Spyder underwent a minor facelift. This meant a new, somewhat larger grille with its lower edge pulled somewhat lower into the lower lip of the front bumper was installed. The Spyder also got a glass rear window in 2003 instead of the standard plastic material. The new grille also features horizontal bars, while the 1963 style oval Maserati logo “Saetta” now mounted on the C-pillars, and a new air outlet (as per GranSport versions) featured with a new rear bumper.

Coupé/Spyder/GranSport production figures
| Model | Years | GT | Cambiocorsa | 90th Anniversary | MC Victory | Total |
|---|---|---|---|---|---|---|
| Spyder | 2001–2007 | 574 | 3,134 | 181 | | 3,889 |
| Coupé | 2002–2007 | 1,078 | 5,371 | | | 6,449 |
| GranSport | 2004–2007 | | 2,432 | | 181 | 2,613 |
| GranSport Spyder | 2005–2007 | | 472 | | | 472 |
| Total | | 1,652 | 11,409 | 181 | 181 | 13,423 |

== Specifications ==
The Maserati Coupé and Spyder utilise the same vehicle systems – engine, transmission, suspension, and interior driver and front passenger controls and safety equipment. Their performance specifications are almost identical, with some reviewers claiming that the Coupé has better performance due to its lesser weight and more rigid body structure, while others measured faster performance from the Spyder. Both models came standard with 18 inch alloy wheels that originally had a 15-spoke design, but after 2003 most buyers chose the optional 7-spoke sport wheels which became standard by 2005. Maserati offered sixteen exterior colours, ten shades of leather interior along with the ability to select among colours for various interior details such as the piping and stitching used. Five colours for the Spyder's convertible top were also offered.

=== Engine ===
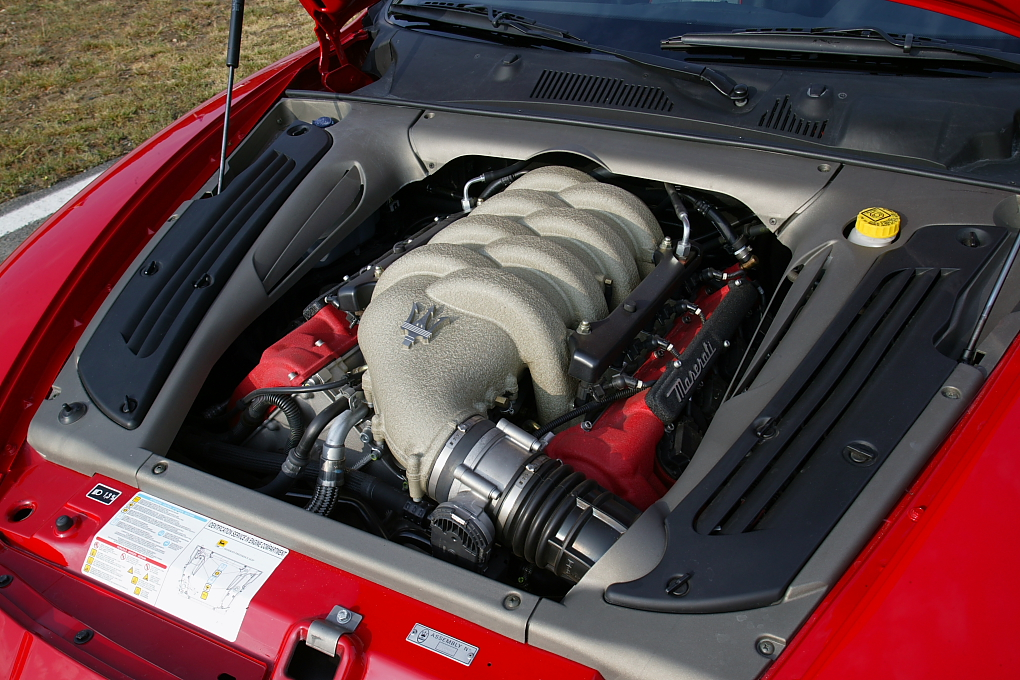
The 4.2-litre Ferrari-Maserati F136 R V8 Engine

Both models utilize the F136 R V8 belonging to the Ferrari-Maserati F136 engine family; it displaces 4,244 cc and is rated at 390 PS (287 kW; 385 hp) at 7,000 rpm with a peak torque of 450 N⋅m (332 lb⋅ft) at 4,500 rpm.

Significant changes from the prior 3200 GT engine were the larger displacement resulting from an increased cylinder bore diameter and the move to a naturally aspirated intake system which replaced the twin-turbocharged induction approach Maserati had used for the previous 20 years, fundamentally because the powertrain was now Ferrari based. The crankshaft is of crossplane design. The engine operates at a compression ratio of 11.1:1 with the eight cylinders configured in a 90° V design. The cylinder bore diameter is 92 mm (3.62 in) and piston stroke length is 80 mm (3.15 in). The engine shares many of the design features of modern racing engines, including dry sump lubrication, a pump assembly located outside the crankcase, and four valves per cylinder. The 32-valve DOHC utilises chain-driven, twin-overhead camshafts that provide valve actuation in less than 0.15 seconds, with the intake cams being controlled by variable valve timing. The crankcase and cylinder heads are made from an aluminium and silicon alloy, giving the engine a relatively light weight of 184 kg (406 lb).

=== Transmission ===
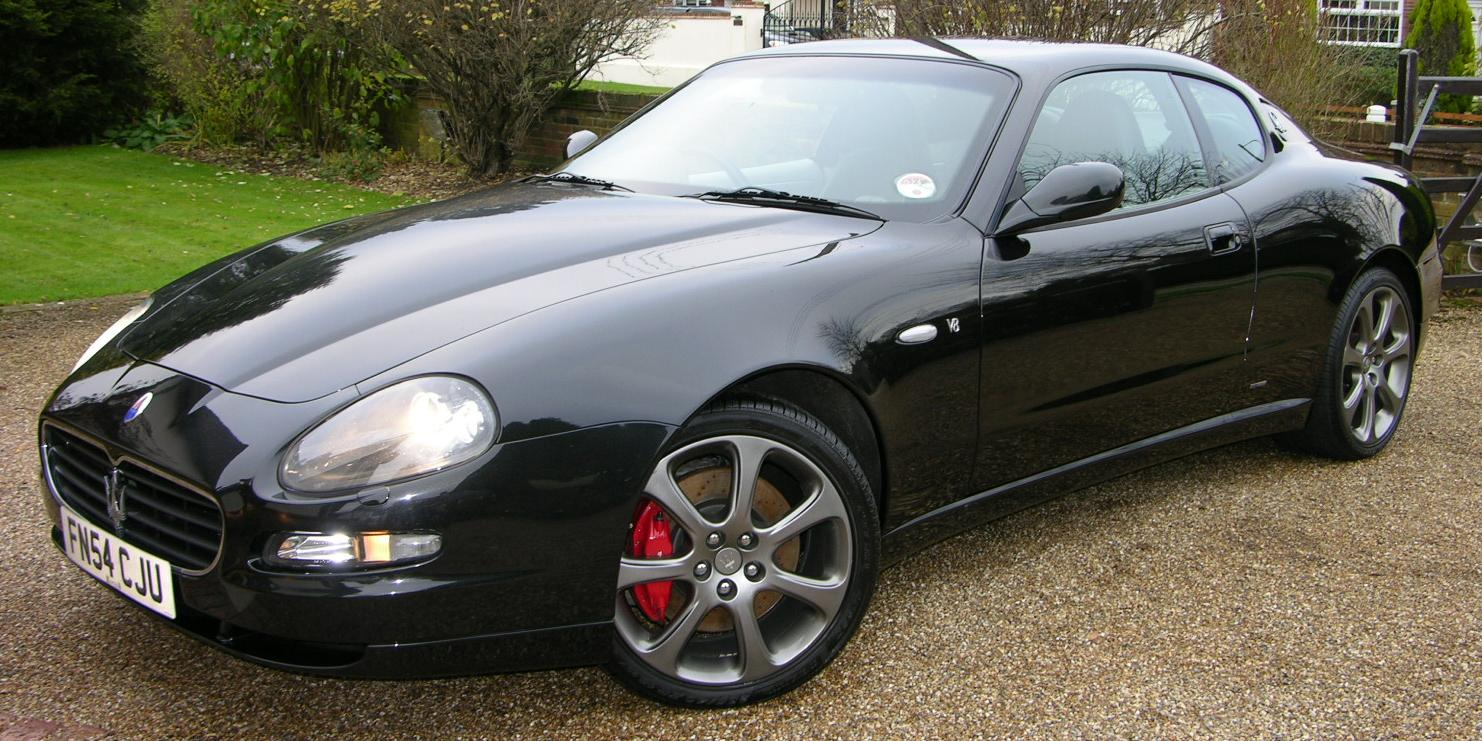
Post-facelift styling

The manual transmission is a six-speed unit that was available either as a GT or CC (Cambiocorsa) using paddle shifters. The GT version utilises a foot-operated clutch, whereas the Cambiocorsa (Italian, meaning "race shift”) is an automated manual transmission. It uses a Formula One-type gearbox, built by Graziano Trasmissioni, with hydraulic operation and electronic management operated by F1-style paddles behind the steering wheel, similar to the system used in Ferrari sports cars. The system allows the driver to choose between four different operating modes: Normal, Sport, Auto and Low Grip. Each of these programs is selected by means of console-mounted buttons, corresponding to different types of operating mode. By switching between the Normal and Sport modes, the driver can select between different electronic stability control settings and, if installed, different active suspension settings. Normal mode provides a more comfortable ride, whereas Sport mode stiffens up the suspension and provides fast gear shifts of around a quarter of a second. Automatic mode electronically handles shifting of the transmission, but allows the driver to rapidly revert to manual using the F1-style paddles. The Low Grip, or Ice mode, allows for smooth starting and gear changes on snow and ice.

The transmission is of a transaxle type and located at the rear of the vehicle. It is integrated in with the differential, unlike its predecessor. This gives both the Coupé and Spyder a 48/52% weight distribution between the front and rear axles.

=== Suspension ===
The Maserati Coupé and Spyder both have a light alloy double wishbone suspension. The rear suspension is fitted with a toe-in regulator bar which enhances the precision of the drive train and provides balanced cornering. The front suspension layout incorporates “anti-dive” features to prevent nose-diving when braking. The suspension system is completed by front and rear anti-roll bars.

Perhaps the most highly regarded option is a computer-controlled suspension damping system called "Skyhook". This adaptive damping system uses coil-over shock absorbers and a set of six accelerometers that continually monitor the movement of the wheels along with the car's body and transmits this information to a control unit. The vehicle's computer analyses this data and coordinates it with the Cambiocorsa transmission and other Maserati safety systems. Skyhook then calculates, and recalculates the data at least 40 times per second and instantaneously adjusts each shock absorber accordingly. When placed in the Sport mode, the suspension firms up for better cornering.

=== Safety ===
Both models are equipped with front and side driver and passenger airbags as well as seat belt pre-tensioners. Driving stability is provided by Maserati Stability Program (MSP) which became standard on the 2004 models and controls the engine and brakes to help the driver control the vehicle in extreme driving situations. The MSP system integrates four different vehicle systems - the anti-slip regulation traction control (ASR), the motor spin regulation (MSR), electronic brake force distribution (EBD), and anti-lock braking system (ABS). The wheels employ a high-performance Brembo braking system with light alloy four-piston calipers and cross-drilled large ventilating brake discs.

=== Interior ===
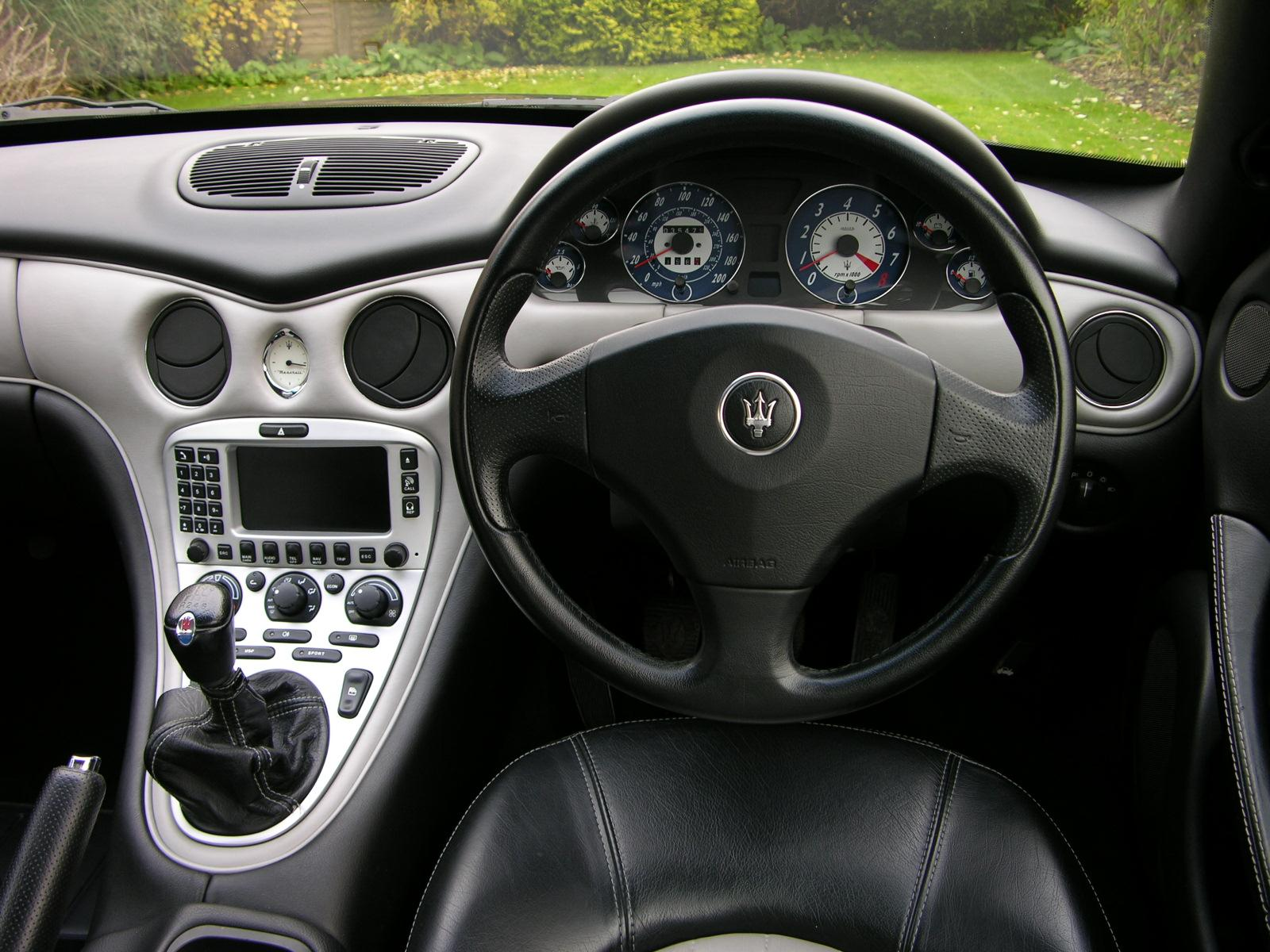
Interior

The Coupé and Spyder came standard with an infotainment system present on the centre console that combines audio and climate controls. An optional GPS navigation system and hands-free GSM phone were also available as options integrated into the infotainment system. Additional optional equipment includes xenon headlights, upgraded audio system and CD changer, electrochromic rear view mirror, rear parking sensors, seat heaters, and cruise control. Various interior trim packages were offered, including a leather headliner featuring a grosgrain pattern, and either a carbon fibre kit or Briar wood kit sporting wood portions of the steering wheel, door trim, and shifter. Purchasers could even order custom Maserati luggage, made to match their car's interiors.

| Model | Years | Displacement | Peak power | Peak torque | Top speed | Acceleration 0–100 km/h (0-62 mph)(seconds) |
|---|---|---|---|---|---|---|
| Spyder | 2001–2007 | 4,244 cc (259.0 cu in) | 390 PS (287 kW; 385 hp) at 7,000 rpm | 451 N⋅m (333 lb⋅ft) at 4,500 rpm | 283 km/h (176 mph) | 5.0 |
| Coupé | 2002–2007 | 4,244 cc (259.0 cu in) | 390 PS (287 kW; 385 hp) at 7,000 rpm | 451 N⋅m (333 lb⋅ft) at 4,500 rpm | 285 km/h (177 mph) | 4.9 |
| GranSport | 2004–2007 | 4,244 cc (259.0 cu in) | 400 PS (294 kW; 395 hp) at 7,000 rpm | 452 N⋅m (333 lb⋅ft) at 4,500 rpm | 290 km/h (180 mph) | 4.85 |
| GranSport Spyder | 2005–2007 | 4,244 cc (259.0 cu in) | 400 PS (294 kW; 395 hp) at 7,000 rpm | 452 N⋅m (333 lb⋅ft) at 4,500 rpm | 290 km/h (180 mph) | 4.95 |

== Maserati GranSport ==
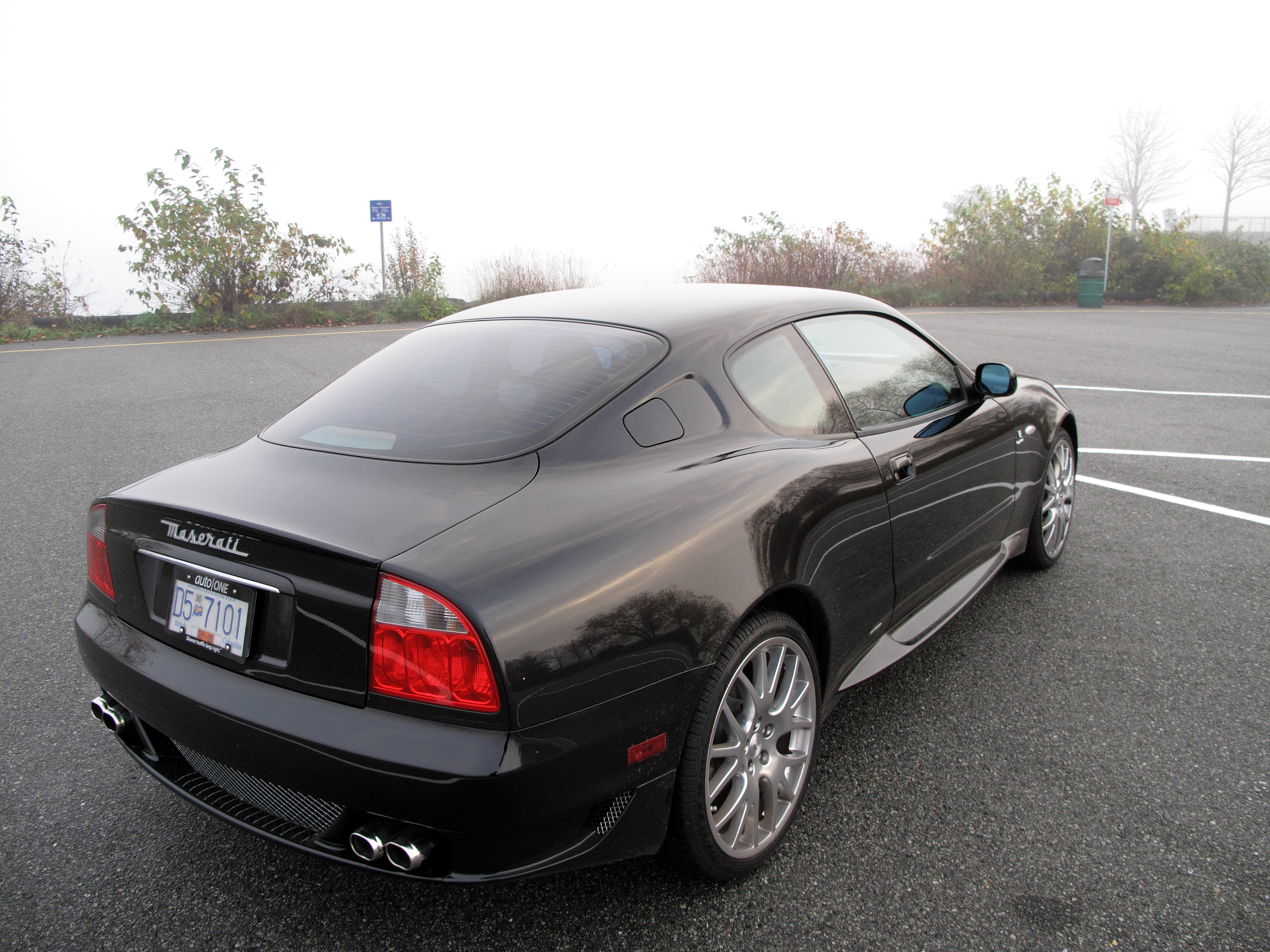
GranSport

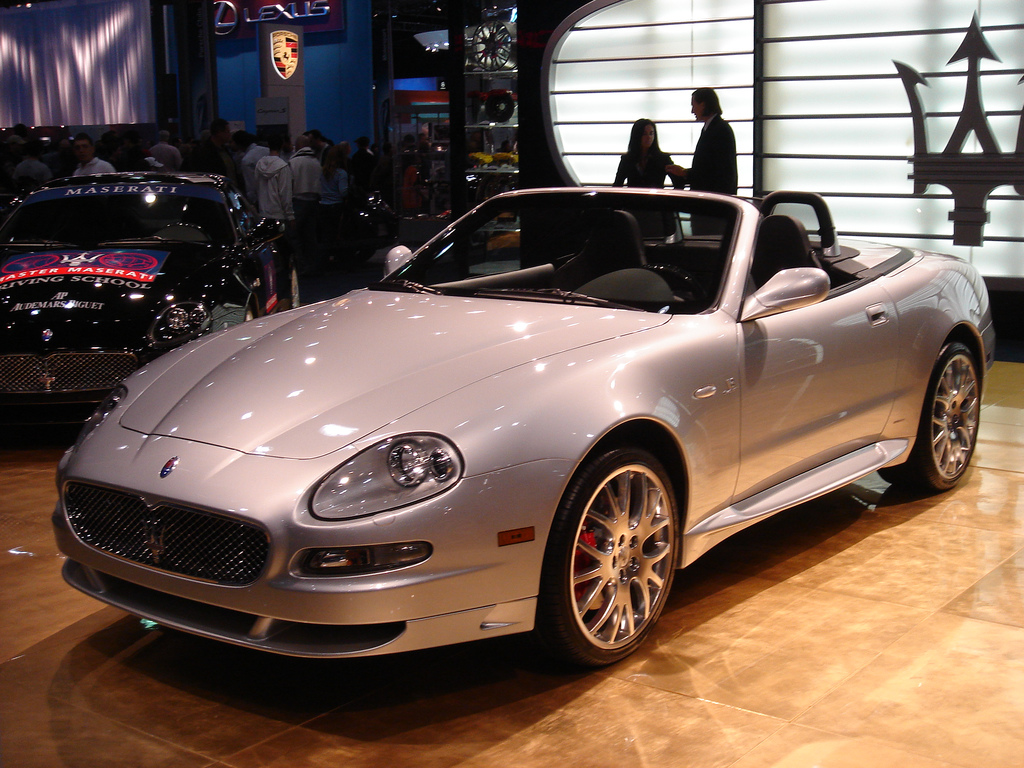
GranSport Spyder

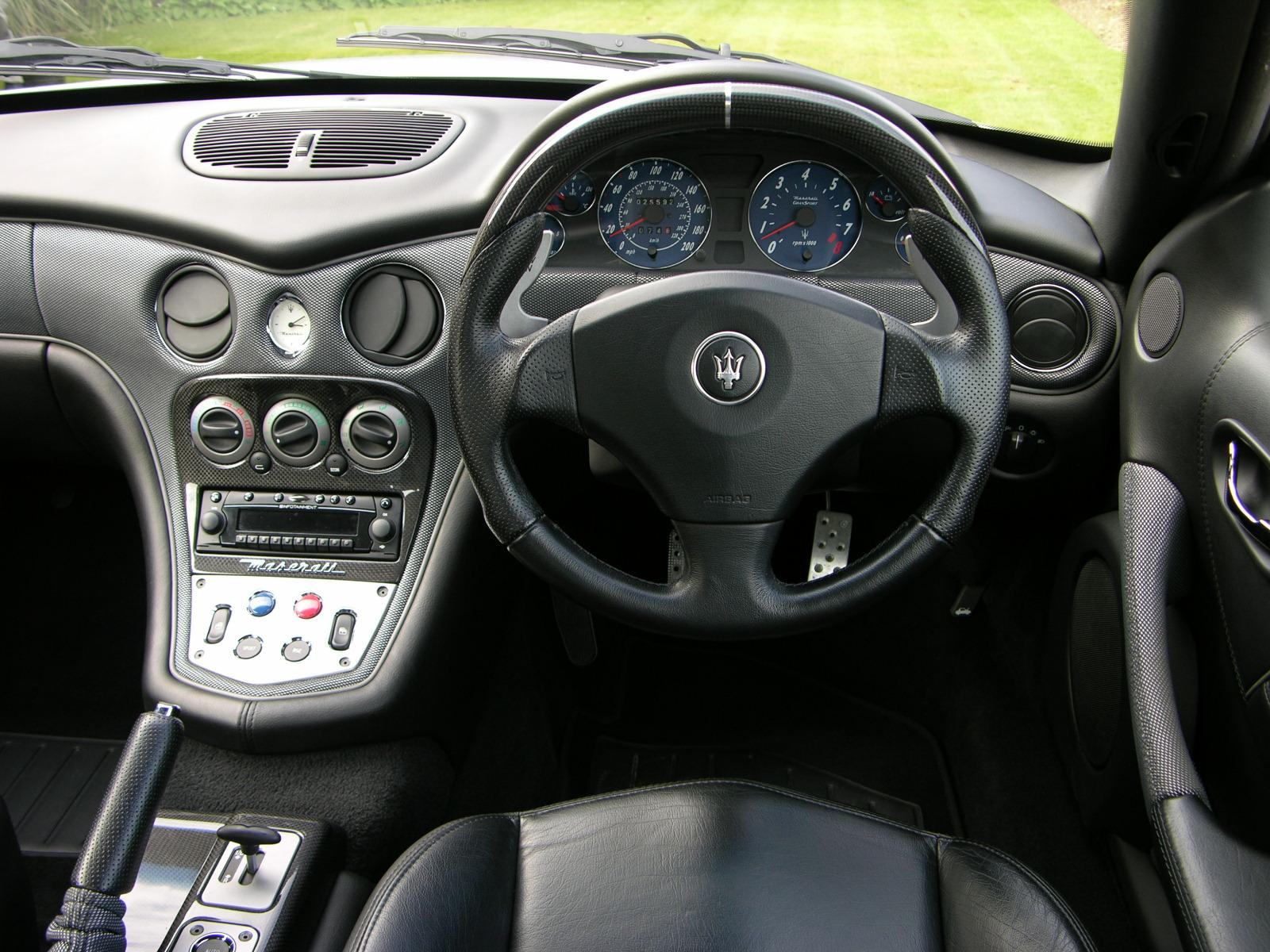
Interior

The Maserati GranSport is a sportier version of the Coupé that was first unveiled at the March 2004 Geneva Motor Show. It featured improved aerodynamics, retuned suspension, engine and transmission, and a sportier interior. Frank Stephenson, as newly appointed Director of Ferrari-Maserati Concept Design and Development, was responsible for exterior and interior redesign. An open-top GranSport Spyder with similar modifications was introduced a year later, at the September 2005 Frankfurt Motor Show.

It is powered by the same 4,244 cc, dry sump, 90° V8 engine used on the standard Coupé and Spyder. However, the engine is rated at 400 PS (294 kW; 395 hp) at 7,000 rpm due primarily to a different exhaust system and improvements on the intake manifolds and valve seats. Only the six-speed Cambiocorsa paddle shift transmission was offered, and was recalibrated for quicker shifts. The exhaust, equipped with bypass valves, was also specially tuned to "growl" on start-up and full throttle. The GranSport used the Skyhook active suspension, with a 10 mm (0.4 in) lower ride height. Other than height, the exterior dimensions and curb weight were unchanged from the Cambiocorsa Coupé and Spyder. The GranSport had a claimed top speed of 290 km/h (180 mph), and a 0 to 100 km/h (0 to 62 mph) acceleration time of 4.85 seconds.

The higher top speed was possible due to a taller sixth gear ratio and more aerodynamic body cladding. New bumpers, side skirts, rear lip spoiler and underbody panels lowered the drag coefficient by 0.02 to 0.33 and simultaneously reduced lift. Chrome mesh grilles to the front and rear bumpers, and "Trofeo"-design 19-inch wheels with trident-shaped spokes were other distinguishing exterior features.

Inside, the GranSport was fitted with wide, highly contoured sport seats, which required a slimmer centre console (constructed in carbon fibre) and elastic door pockets. Carbon fibre was also used to for the dashboard trim and on the new thick-rimmed steering wheel. On the coupé, the upholstery materials were leather and technical cloth (in black, Nickel Gray or Metal Blue) on the seat centres, backs and dashboard fascia; the Spyder had an all-leather interior. Seven paint colours were available: solid Giallo Granturismo and Rosso Mondiale, metallic Nero Carbonio, Blu Mediterraneo, Grigio Alfieri and Grigio Touring, and special triple-layer white Bianco Fuji.

=== GS Zagato ===
The limited production Maserati GS Zagato was introduced by Zagato at the 2007 Concorso d'Eleganza Villa d'Este. Its design is inspired by the 1954 Maserati A6G Berlinetta Zagato. Cars were based on a shorter GranSport Spyder chassis with aluminium bodywork designed by Norihiko Harada. The two-seater coupé was commissioned by a Maserati CEO, Karl-Heinz Kalbfell and in total only nine units were created.

=== A8GCS Berlinetta ===
The A8GCS Berlinetta is a concept car based on the Maserati GranSport from coachbuilder Carrozzeria Touring Superleggera, presented in 2009.

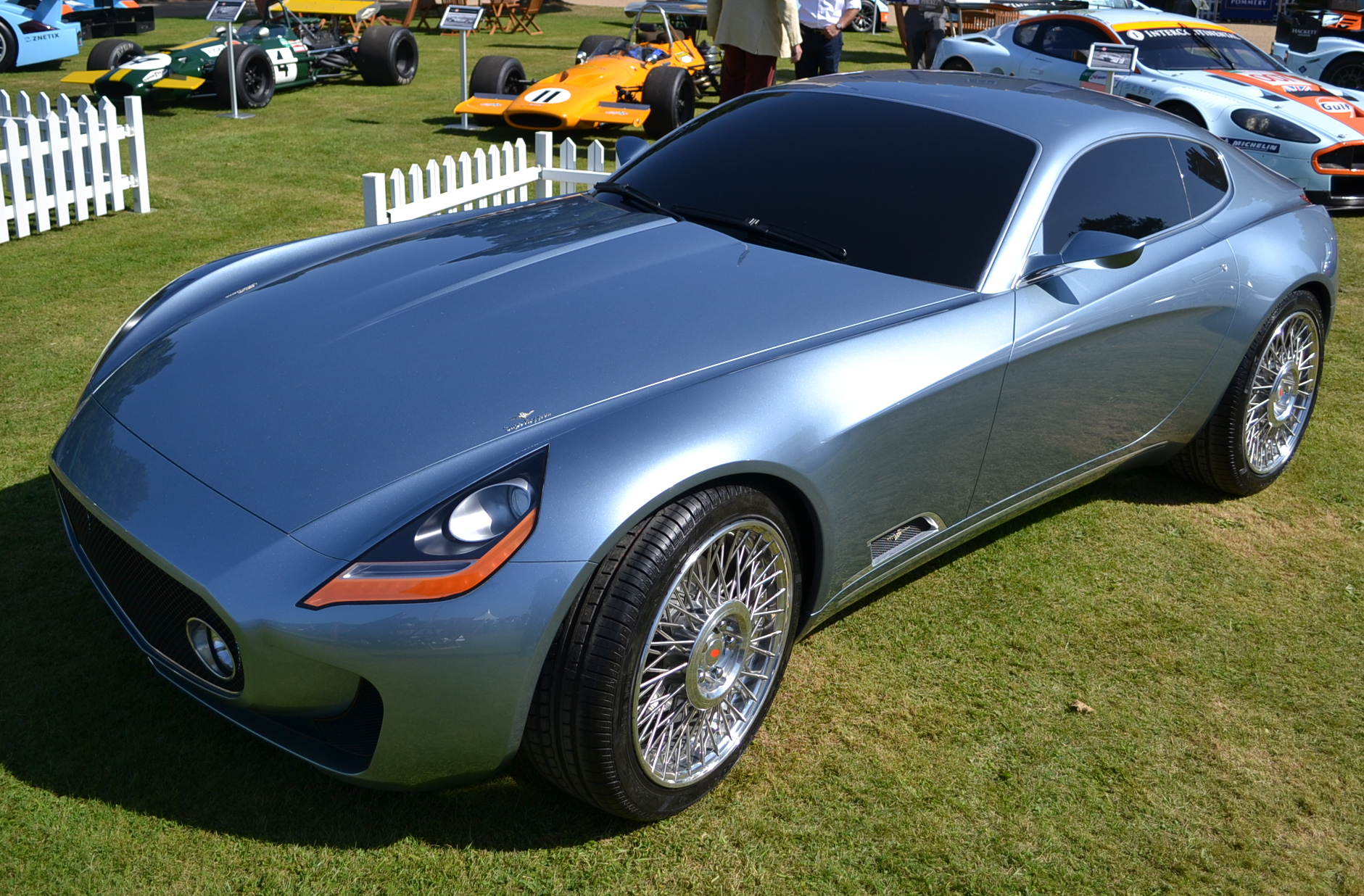
A8GCS Berlinetta

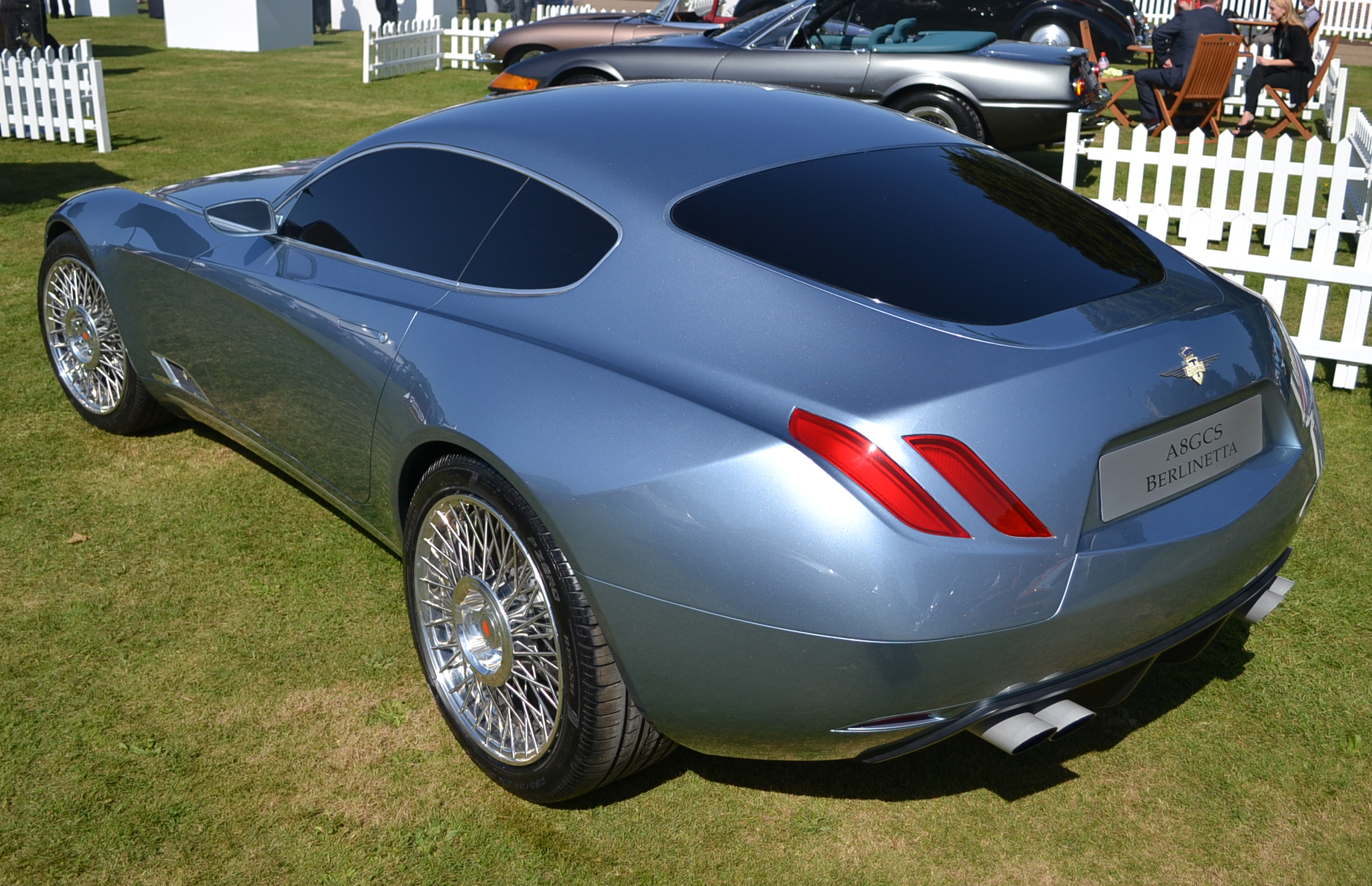

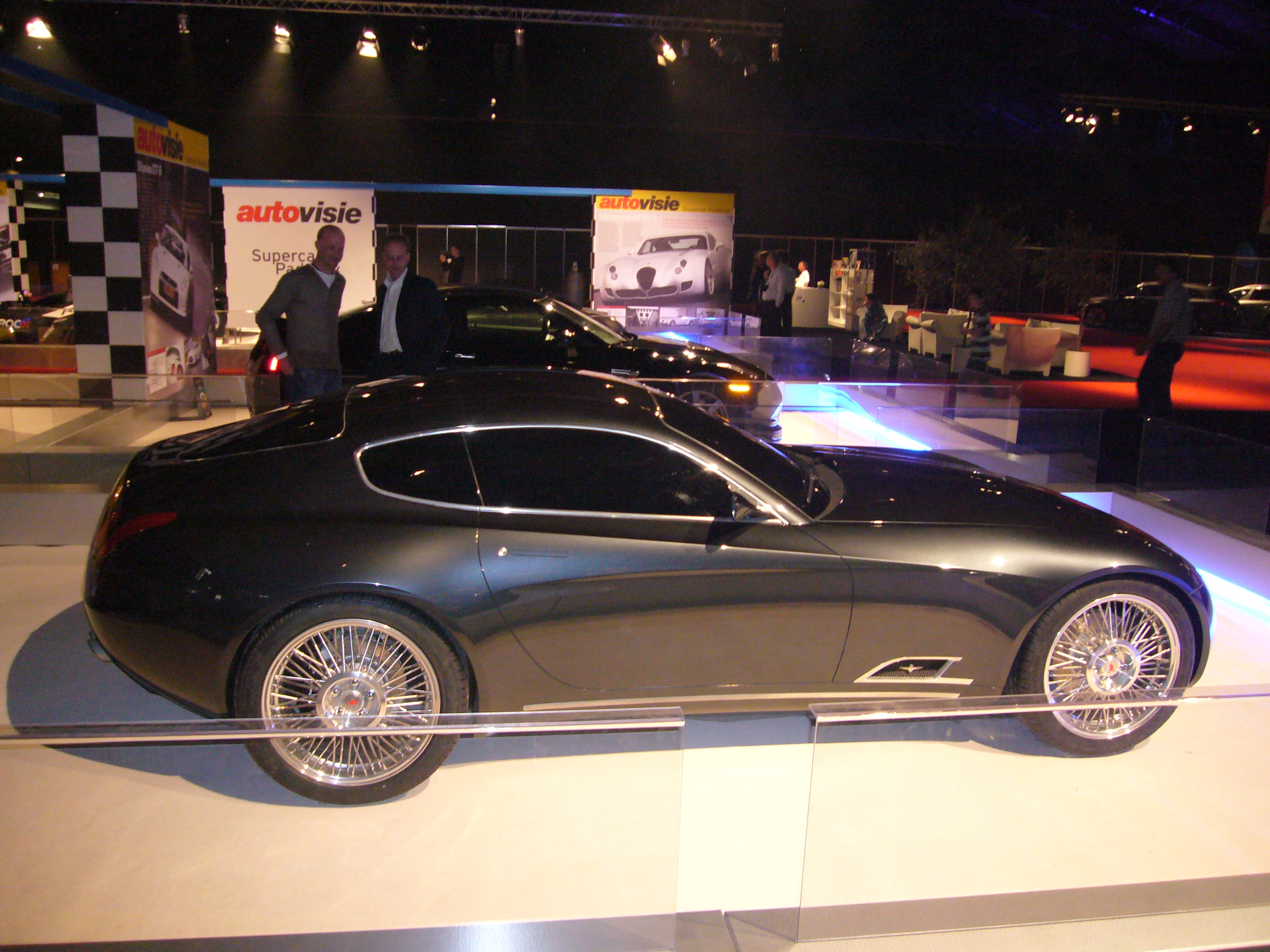

== Maserati Trofeo ==
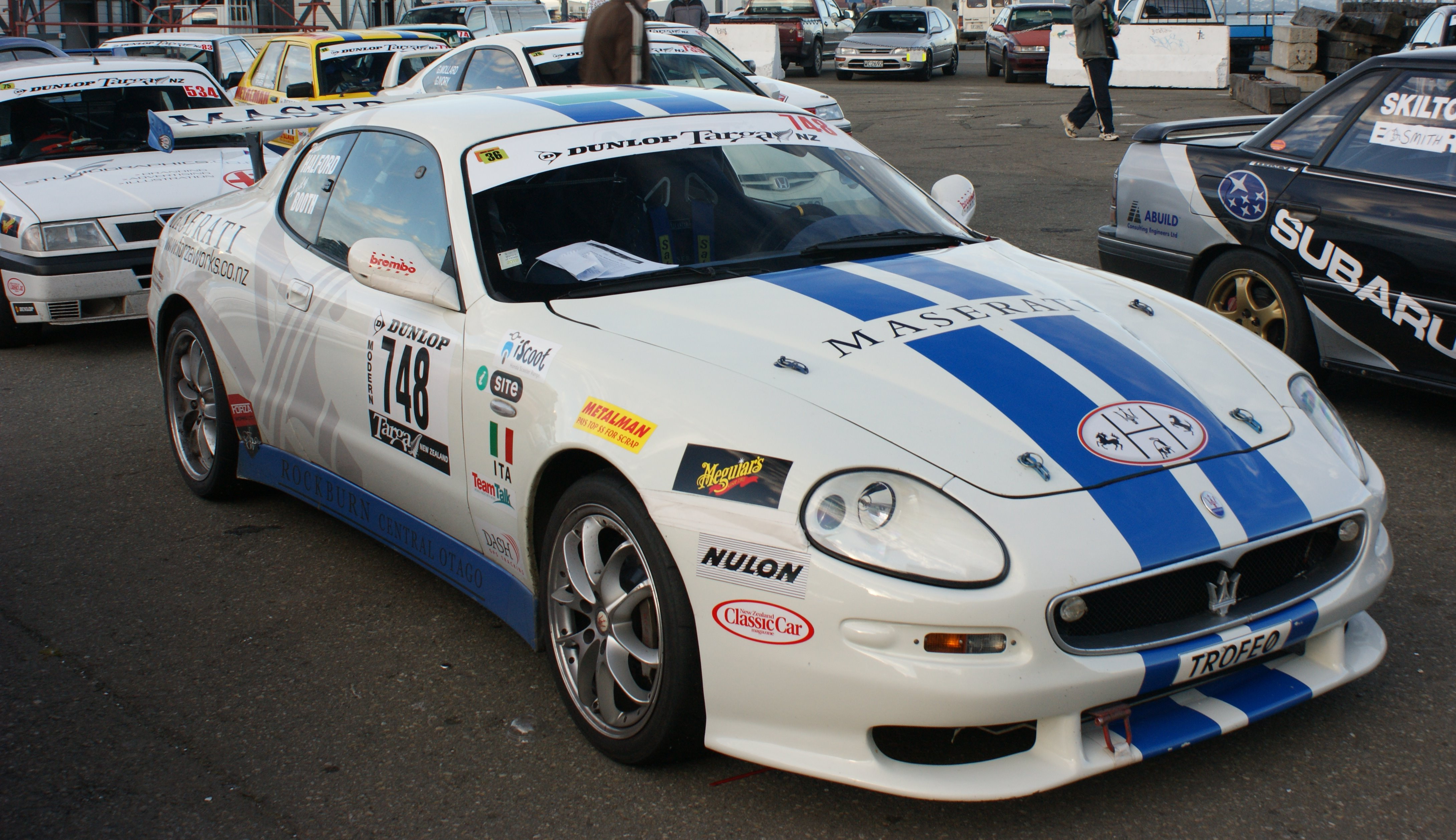
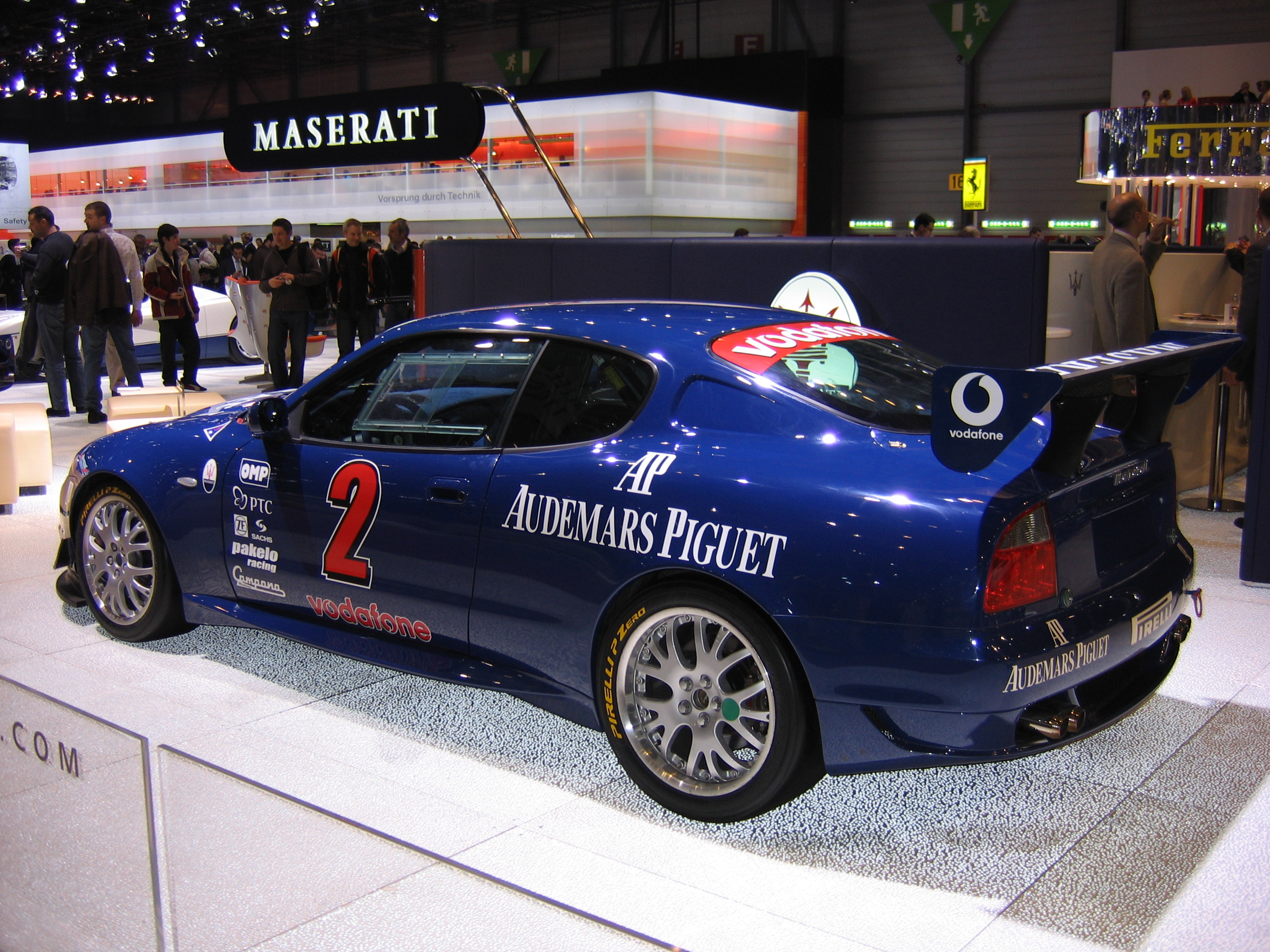
Maserati Trofeo (front view) and Trofeo GranSport (rear view)

The Maserati Trofeo is a racing version of the Coupé that was introduced in 2003. It utilises the standard engine of the coupé that is rated at 420 PS (309 kW; 414 hp) due to a revised engine mapping and a modified free-flowing exhaust that uses a baffle-free muffler. Vehicle weight was reduced by 249 kg (550 lb) as a result of many comfort oriented components being stripped out: soundproofing, air conditioning, and the leather interior were left out, with the regular seats being replaced by racing seats. Carbon-fibre doors and hood replaced the standard car's steel components, and plexiglass replaced the side window glass. The result is a 0-97 km/h (60 mph) acceleration time of 4.0 seconds. A Trofeo racing series was organized for enthusiasts, with a per-race rental charge of about US$20,000. For the 2005 season of the race, the Coupé-based Trofeo was updated and since based on GranSport model.

A Trofeo Light (or simply the Maserati Light) was also developed for use in various national and international racing series, including the Italian GT Championship, Rolex Sports Car Series, and FIA GT3 European Championship. It is distinguishable from the Trofeo by having a wider flared wheel-arches with air-exhaust behind front wheels and wider rear spoiler.

== Special editions ==
The Maserati Coupé and Spyder special editions are primarily exterior trim packages that were only offered for certain model years or on a limited number of vehicles. They include:

- 2004 'Spyder 90th Anniversary'
- GranSport 'Limited Edition'
- 2006 GranSport 'MC Victory'
- 2006 GranSport 'Contemporary Classic'
- 2007 GranSport 'Maserati and Cornes 10th Anniversary'

Also, in 2004, a Vintage trim package was introduced. It includes chrome air-exhaust vents in the front fenders, a new polished wheel design, silver-finished brake calipers, and chrome door handles. The front fender vents were intended to evoke those of the 1957 3500 GT.

A 2004 Coupé 90th Anniversary edition was announced, but apparently never produced.

The 'Spyder 90th Anniversary' was shown in late 2004 and produced in the limited number of 90 cars for North America and another 90 cars for the rest of the world. 15 were in right-hand drive, mainly for Britain. This edition is not a GranSport but a regular Spyder model that is visually based on the GranSport bodykit (without power upgrades), and may be recognised by its oval Maserati badges on the front fenders, titanium coloured brake calipers, grey headlamp housings and a special blue/grey interior with limited edition plaque. The headrests also received aerodynamic fairings behind the rollover bars. Special Blu Anniversary paint could be chosen.

The 'MC Victory' edition features details made out of carbon fibre like: front splitter, racing seats and rear nolder. Centre console bears the limited edition plaque and there are Italian flag emblems embedded into front fenders. Most cars were chosen in exclusive Blu Victory paint. It was unveiled at the 2006 Geneva Motor Show to celebrate the racing success of the MC12 GT1. Only 181 cars were made.

A 'Limited Edition', destined for US market is recognizable for the “Saetta” logo featuring the Trident with red accents and oval Maserati badges on front fenders. Minor upgrades for the interior, including an "Auditorium 200" sound system and full leather headliner were included.

The GranSport 'Contemporary Classic' was offered in 4 basic colours with interior piping around the seats and dashboard matching with body paint. Also recognisable by light blue dials.

GranSport 'Maserati and Cornes 10th Anniversary', 35 units were made to commemorate the 10th anniversary of Japanese importer Cornes & Co. cooperation with Maserati. It was available in black or white with beige or blue interior respectively. Front fenders sport the same Italian flag emblem as MC Victory. Interior features include a limited edition plaque, but without numbering, and light blue dials.

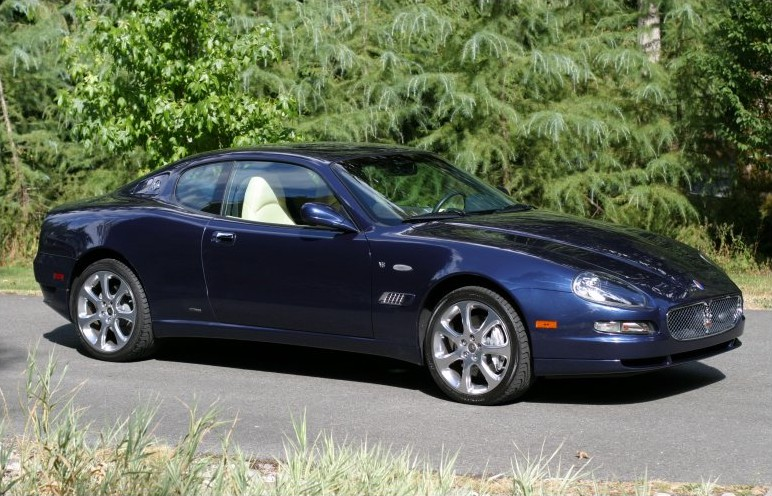
Maserati Coupé with Vintage package (post-facelift)

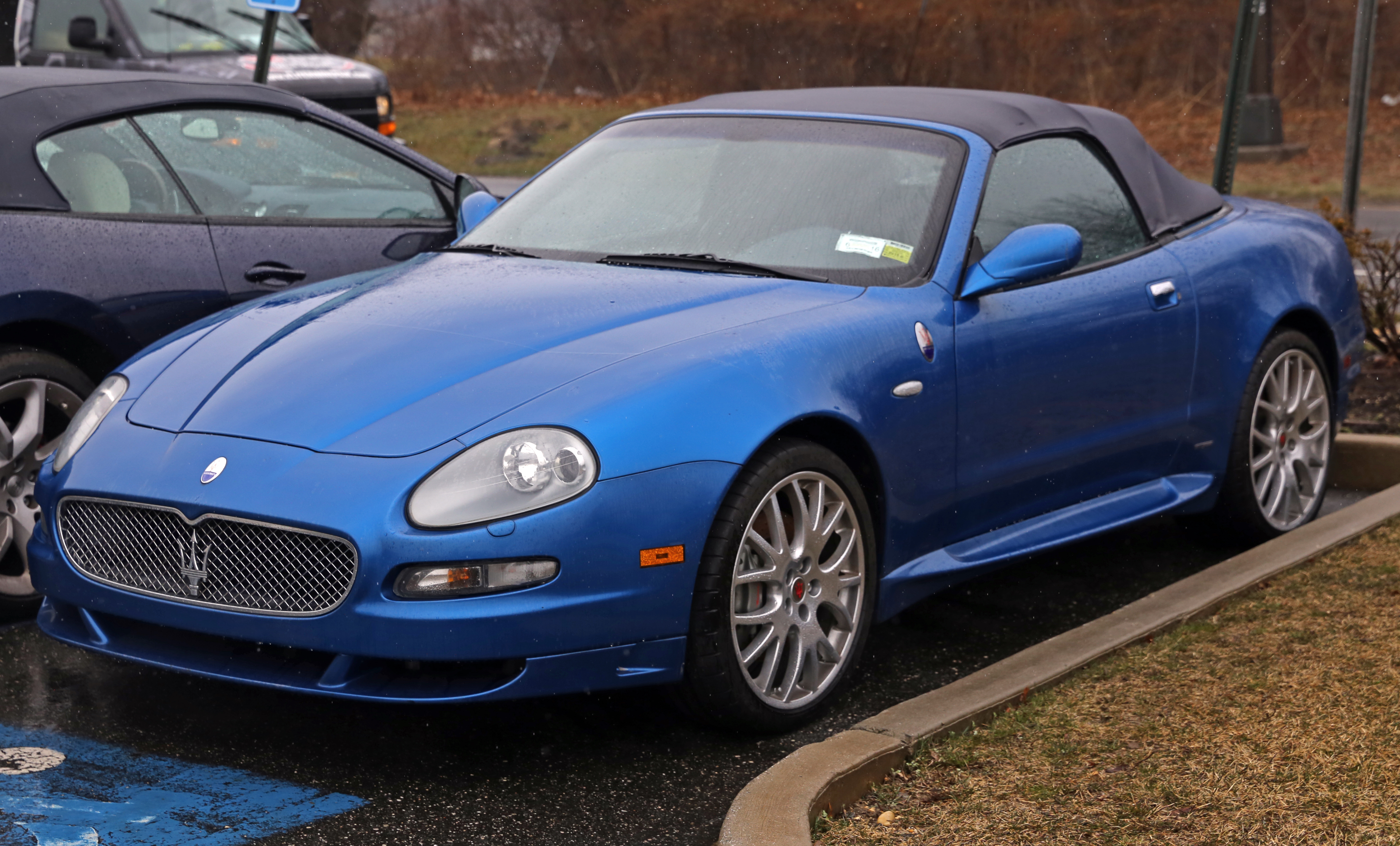
Maserati Spyder 90th Anniversary

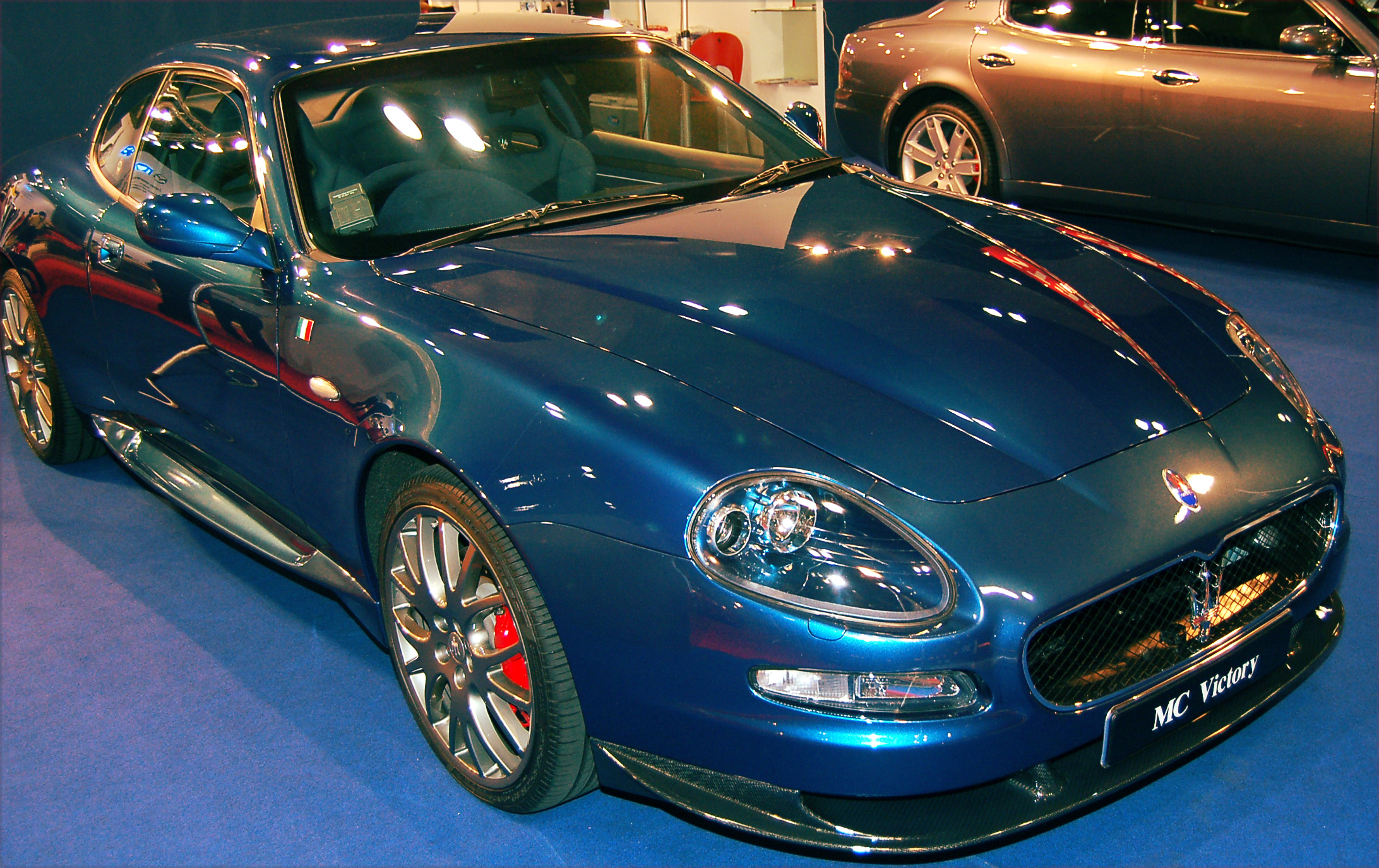
Maserati GranSport MC Victory

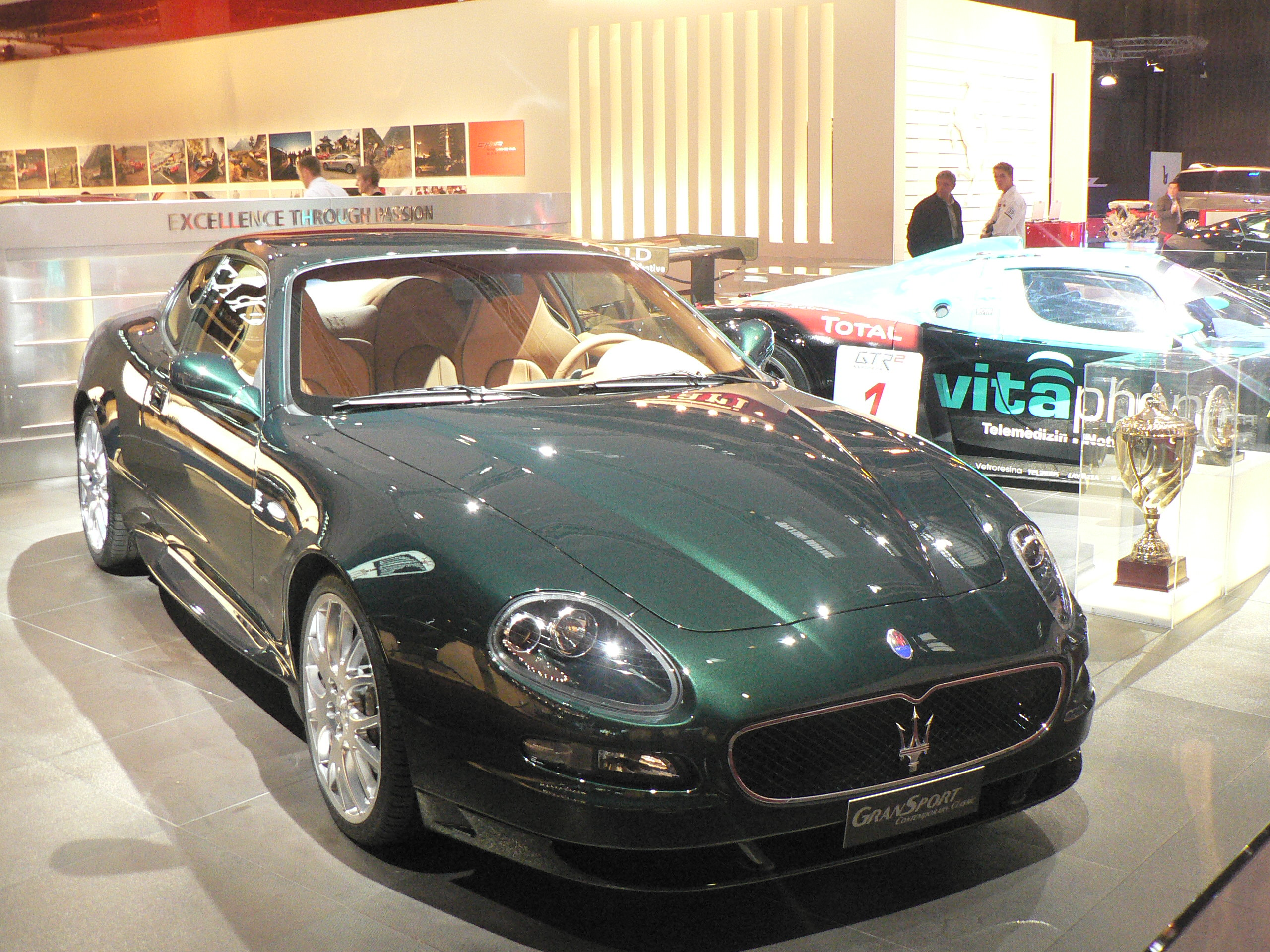
Maserati GranSport Contemporary Classic in green with matching interior piping

== Maserati 420 Super Monoposto ==
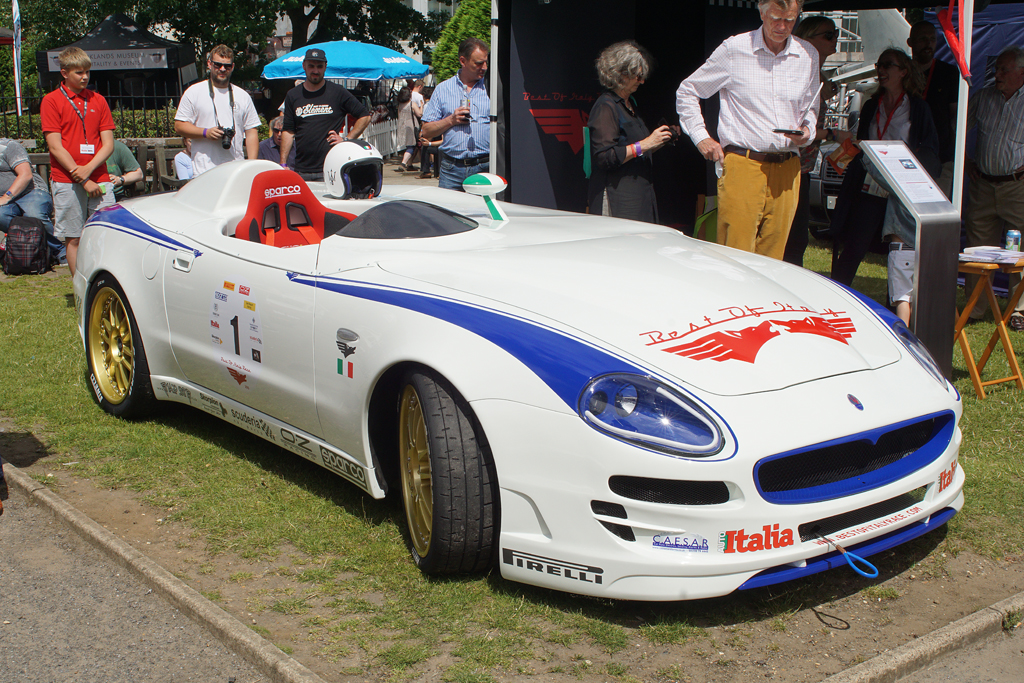
The Maserati 420 Super Monoposto

The Maserati 420 Super Monoposto is a one-off RHD car inspired by the 2001 Maserati 320S concept. It was revealed in July 2016 at the Brooklands Motor Museum.
