= Maserati 3200 GT =

Grand touring car produced by Maserati

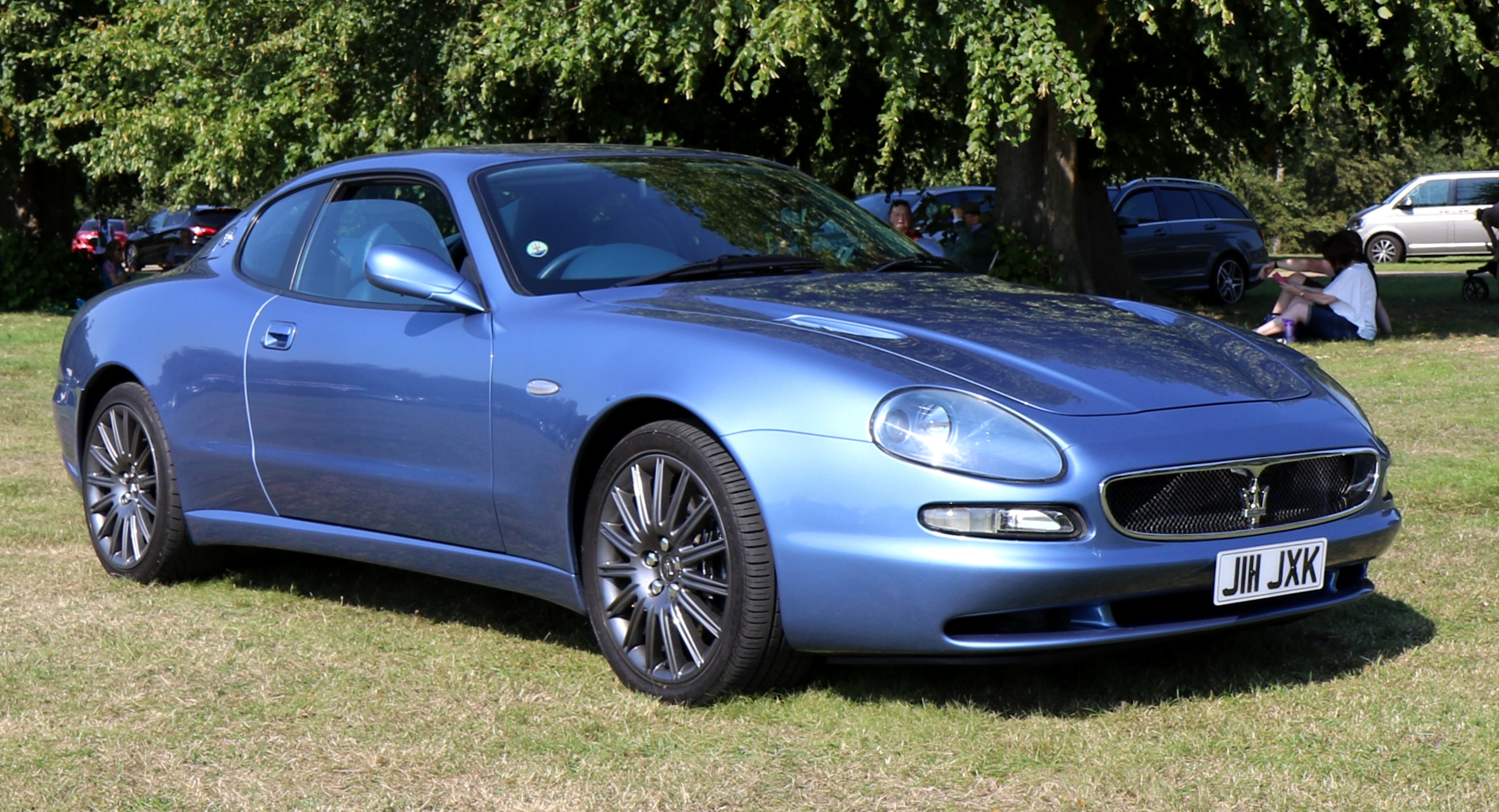

Overview
- Manufacturer: Maserati
- Production: 1998–2002; 4,795 produced
- Assembly: Italy: Modena
- Designer: Giorgetto Giugiaro at Italdesign; Enrico Fumia at Centro Stile Lancia (interior)

Body and chassis
- Class: Grand tourer (S)
- Body style: 2-door 2+2 coupé
- Layout: Front-engine, rear-wheel-drive

Powertrain
- Engine: 3.2 L AM 585 twin-turbocharged V8
- Transmission: 6-speed Getrag 226 manual; 4-speed BTR M72LE automatic

Dimensions
- Wheelbase: 2,660 mm (104.7 in)
- Length: 4,510 mm (177.6 in)
- Width: 1,822 mm (71.7 in)
- Height: 1,305 mm (51.4 in); 1,290 mm (50.8 in) (Assetto Corsa)
- Kerb weight: 1,590–1,620 kg (3,505–3,571 lb)

Chronology
- Predecessor: Maserati Shamal; Maserati Ghibli (AM336)
- Successor: Maserati Coupé

The Maserati 3200 GT (Tipo 338) is a four-seater grand tourer produced by Italian automobile manufacturer Maserati from 1998 to 2002, replacing the Shamal as the flagship grand tourer of the marque. The luxury coupé was designed by Italdesign, whose founder and head Giorgetto Giugiaro previously designed, among others, the Ghibli, Bora and Merak. Interior design was commissioned to Enrico Fumia and completed by 1995. 4,795 cars were produced before it was replaced by the Maserati Coupé.

== History ==
=== Introduction ===
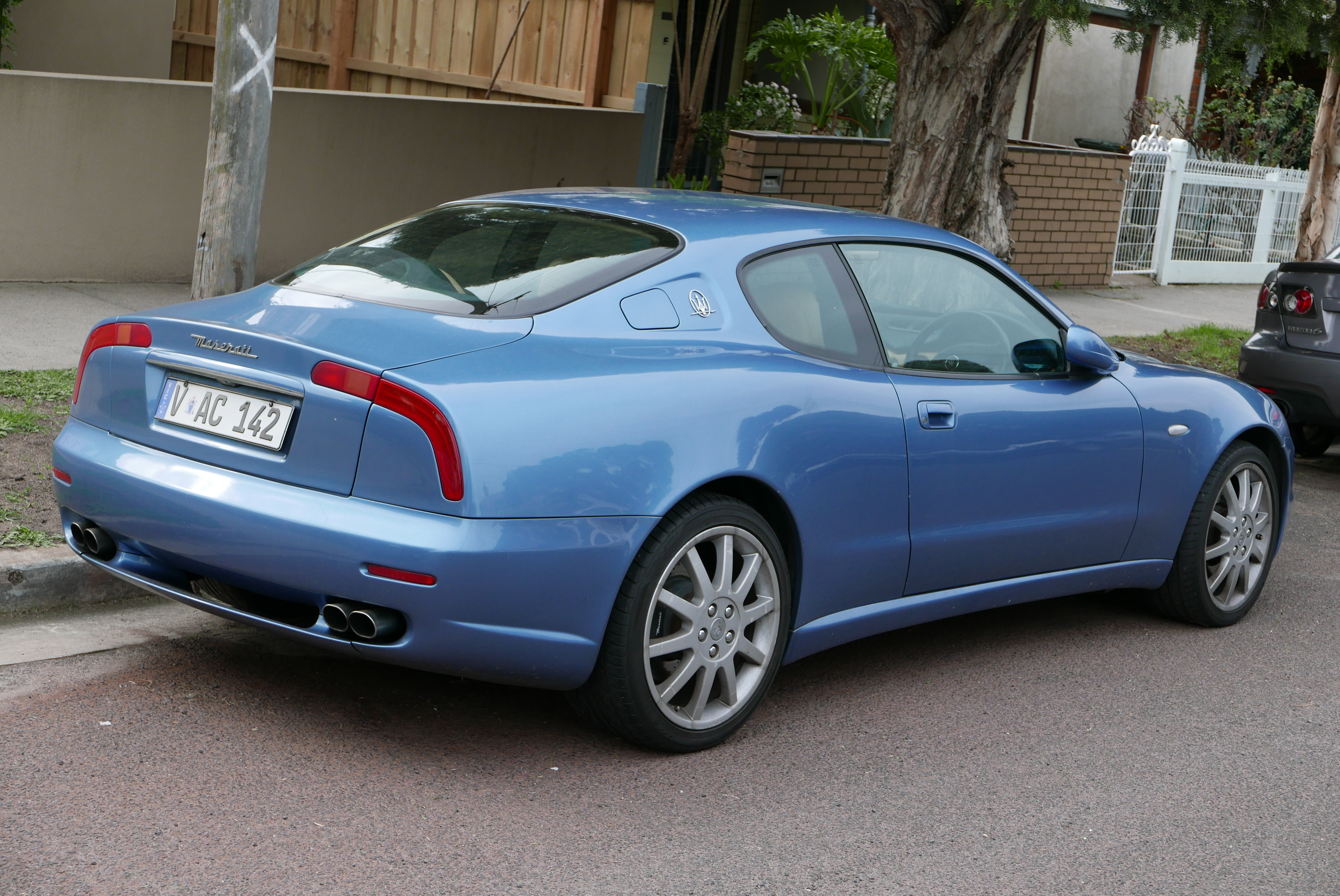
Rear view

The 3200 GT was announced in July 1998 and was presented to the press in September by Luca Cordero di Montezemolo, in the presence of veteran Maserati racing driver Sir Stirling Moss and Giorgetto Giugiaro. The car made its public debut at the October 1998 Mondial de l'Automobile in Paris.

Maserati initially wanted to name the car “Mistral” but after discovering that Volkswagen owned the copyrights to the name, decided to name the car 3200 GT. Its name honoured the 3500 GT, the company's first series production grand tourer. Sold mainly in Europe, the 3200 GT was powered by the twin-turbocharged, 32-valve, dual overhead cam 3.2-litre V8 engine featured in the Quattroporte Evoluzione, rated at 370 PS (272 kW; 365 hp) against the Quattroporte's 335 PS (246 kW; 330 hp) and achieved 116 PS (85 kW; 114 hp) per litre. The manual transmission model was produced until 2001.

The tail-lights consisted of LEDs arranged in the shape of a boomerang. The outer layer of the 'boomerang' provided the brake light, with the inner layer providing the directional indicator. The 3200 GT was the world's first car with full LED taillights. Deliveries started in March 1999. In total 2,689 manual GT models were produced.

=== 3200 GT Automatica ===
In 1999, an automatic transmission equipped model of the 3200 GT became available, either referred to as 3200 GT Automatica or 3200 GTA. Introduced at the March 1999 Geneva Motor Show, it was equipped with a 4-speed conventional torque converter automatic transmission supplied by Australian firm BTR.

Engine output remained unchanged, though the engine was set up specifically for the automatic transmission; according to Maserati, the weight increase over the manual gearbox was limited to 30 kg (66 lb), for a 1,620 kg (3,571 lb) total kerb weight. In Italy the Automatica commanded a 7 million Lire premium over the 3200 GT's 149.5 million Lire list price. This model was produced until 2002. In June 1999 the 1,000th 3200 GT left the factory. In total 2,106 GTA cars were produced.

=== 3200 GT Assetto Corsa ===
Presented to the public at the 2001 Geneva Motor Show, the 3200 GT Assetto Corsa was a limited edition variant of the 3200 GT with a special handling package. Limited to 259 units, 3 of which were special orders, it was available in three standard colours: Grigio Touring, Nero Carbonio and Rosso Mondiale; and available with a manual or automatic transmission. The Assetto Corsa was lowered by 15 mm, had larger front anti-roll bar, stiffer springs, soft compound Pirelli P Zero Corsa tyres on dark grey or silver painted BBS alloy wheels, and specific brake ventilation ducts. The interior featured black perforated Connolly leather seats with red stitching and 'Assetto Corsa' script on the sill kick panels. Both kerb weight and performance were unchanged from their regular counterparts. Production was divided between 163 manual and 96 automatic cars.

Interior

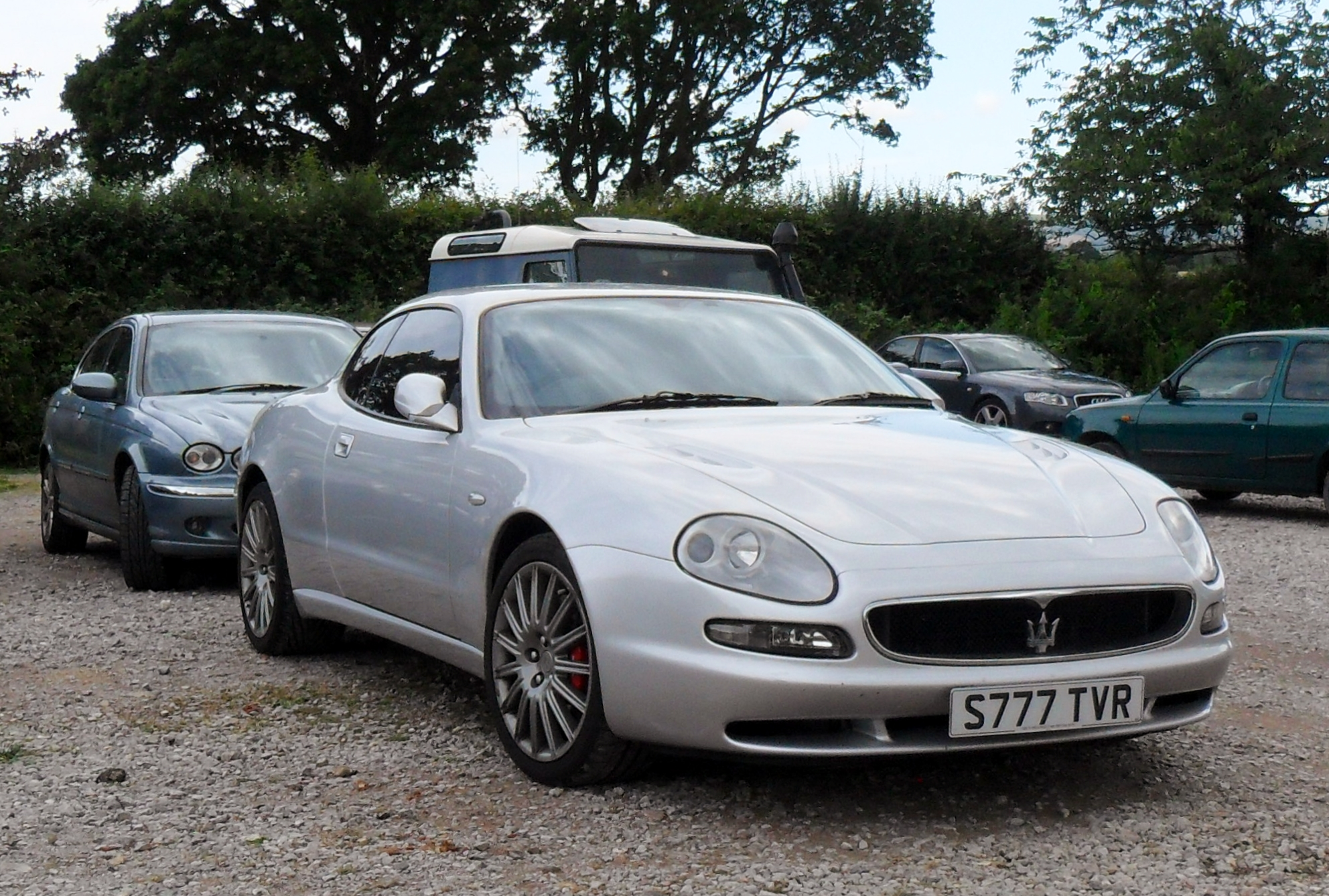
Assetto Corsa

== Specifications ==
The 3200 GT's coupé body seats four people and has a drag coefficient of Cd=0.34. The steel unibody structure was complemented by a front tubular subframe supporting the drivetrain and a rear subframe supporting the suspension links and the differential. Suspension was of the double wishbone type all around, with forged aluminium control arms and uprights, coaxial aluminium-bodied dampers and coil springs, and two anti-roll bars. The gearbox was in line with the front-mounted engine, and transmitted power to the rear limited slip differential via a two-piece aluminium driveshaft. Brembo supplied the braking system, consisting of vented and cross-drilled discs with four-piston callipers on all four wheels. Active safety systems included a four channel anti-lock braking system and Bosch ASR traction control system.

=== Engines and performance ===
The all-aluminium V8 engine (bore and stroke 80 mm) had two overhead camshafts per bank operating four valves per cylinder, two crossflow turbochargers, and a crossplane crankshaft; it featured "drive by wire" electronic throttle control. The engine itself weighs 221 kg (487 lb).

Model	Years	Displacement	Peak power	Peak torque	Top speed	Acceleration 0–100 km/h (0-62 mph) (seconds)
3200 GT	1998–2001	3,217 cc (3.2 L)	370 PS (272 kW; 365 hp) at 6,250 rpm	491 N⋅m (362 lb⋅ft) at 4,500 rpm	280 km/h (174 mph)	5.2 seconds
3200 GTA	1999–2002	3,217 cc (3.2 L)	370 PS (272 kW; 365 hp) at 6,250 rpm	491 N⋅m (362 lb⋅ft) at 4,500 rpm	270 km/h (168 mph)	5.7 seconds

== Maserati 320S ==
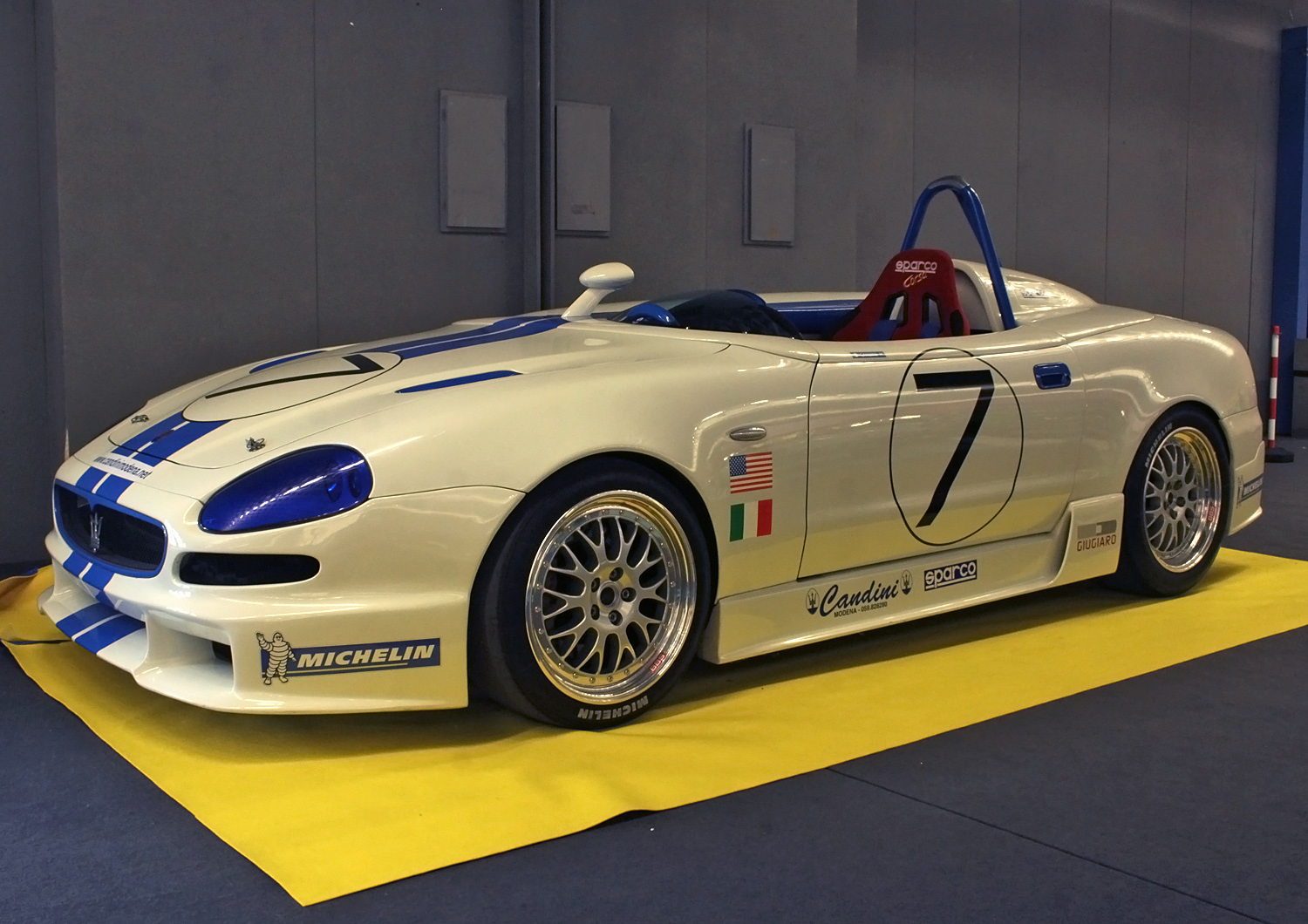
Maserati 320S

The Maserati 320S is a concept racing car based on the 3200 GT and designed by Italdesign Giugiaro as a barchetta. It was first shown at the 2001 Geneva Motor Show as a glimpse of an open top Maserati model. A true barchetta design, the 320S was a single-seater and was fully outfitted for competition with six-point racing belts, an exposed roll bar behind the driver, fire extinguishing system and racing seat supplied by Sparco; weather protection was limited to a small aeroscreen in front of the driver. Compared to the 3200 GT, the 320S's wheelbase was shortened by 22 cm (8.7 in), while the engine remained the same as the 3200 GT with a 6-speed manual transmission.

The bodywork of the 320S features modifications to the aerodynamic shaping of the spoiler on the rear bumper, which features a supplementary nolder to increase the vertical load to the rear.
