= Maserati V8 engine =

Series of V8 motor engines

Maserati V-8 engine
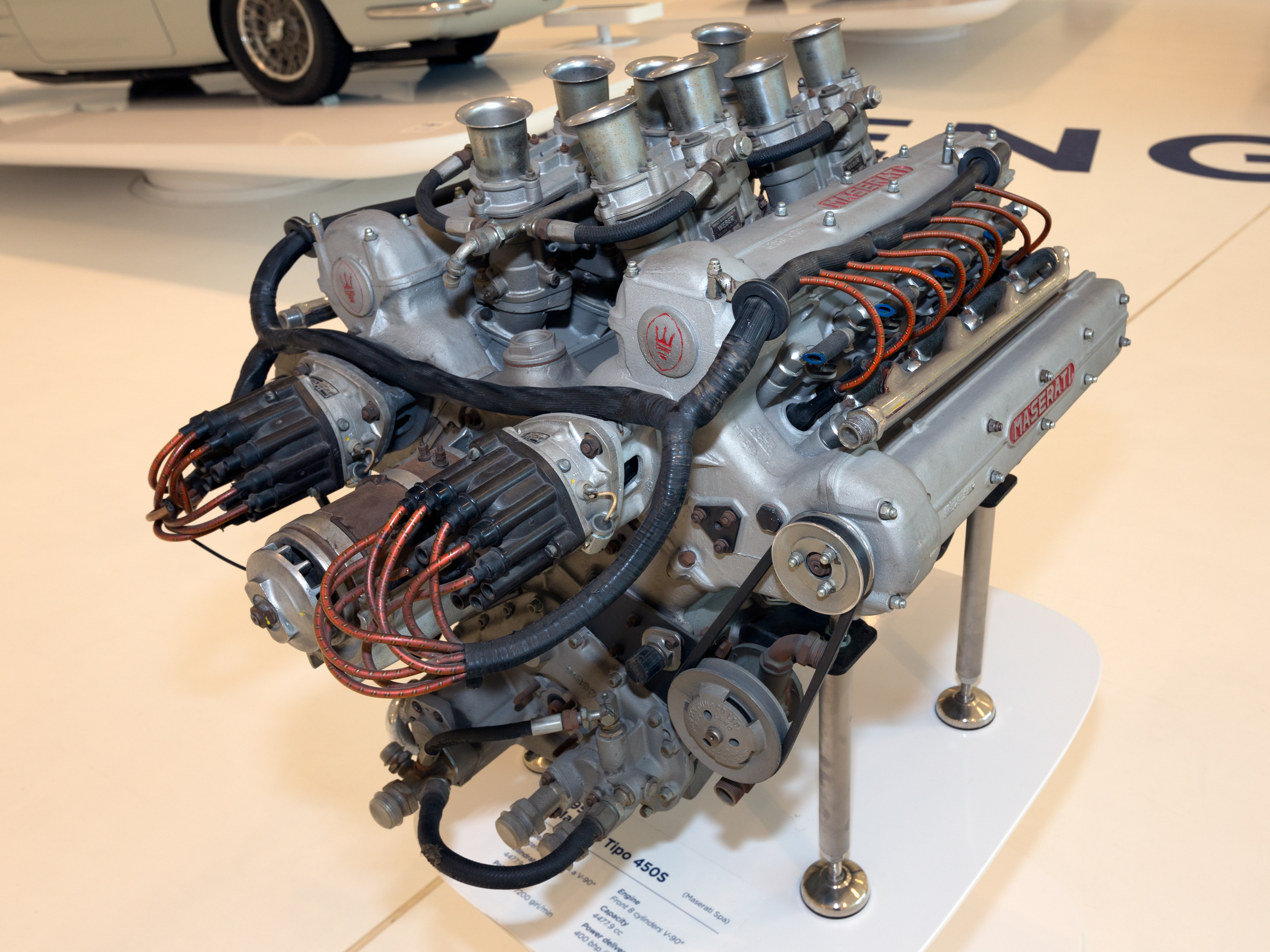

Overview
- Manufacturer: Maserati
- Production: 1939, 1959–2002

Layout
- Configuration: 90° V8
- Displacement: 3.2–6.46 L (195.3–394.2 cu in)
- Cylinder bore: 80–110 mm (3.1–4.3 in)
- Piston stroke: 75.8–89 mm (2.98–3.50 in)
- Valvetrain: 16-valve to 32-valve, DOHC, 2-valves per cylinder to 4-valves per cylinder
- Compression ratio: 8.5:1-10.6:1

Combustion
- Turbocharger: Roots-type supercharger (1939); Naturally aspirated (1959-1990); Twin-turbo (1990-2002)
- Fuel system: Weber carburetor / Fuel injection
- Fuel type: Gasoline
- Cooling system: Water-cooled

Output
- Power output: 260–580 hp (194–433 kW; 264–588 PS)
- Torque output: 258–508 lb⋅ft (350–689 N⋅m)

Chronology
- Successor: Ferrari F136 engine

The Maserati V8 engine family is a series of 90°, four-stroke, naturally-aspirated (later turbocharged), V8 engines, designed, developed and built by Italian manufacturer Maserati for almost 45 consecutive years. A racing variant first appeared in 1939, with the V8RI, and a road-going version was later introduced with the Maserati 5000 GT in 1959, and later ending with the Maserati 3200 GT, in 2002. The engines ranged in displacement from 3.2–6.46 L (195–394 cu in), and production continued until 2002. It was later succeeded by (but not to be confused with) the Ferrari-Maserati engine; a separate engine, completely designed, developed and produced by Ferrari, but used in several Maserati models.

== Applications ==
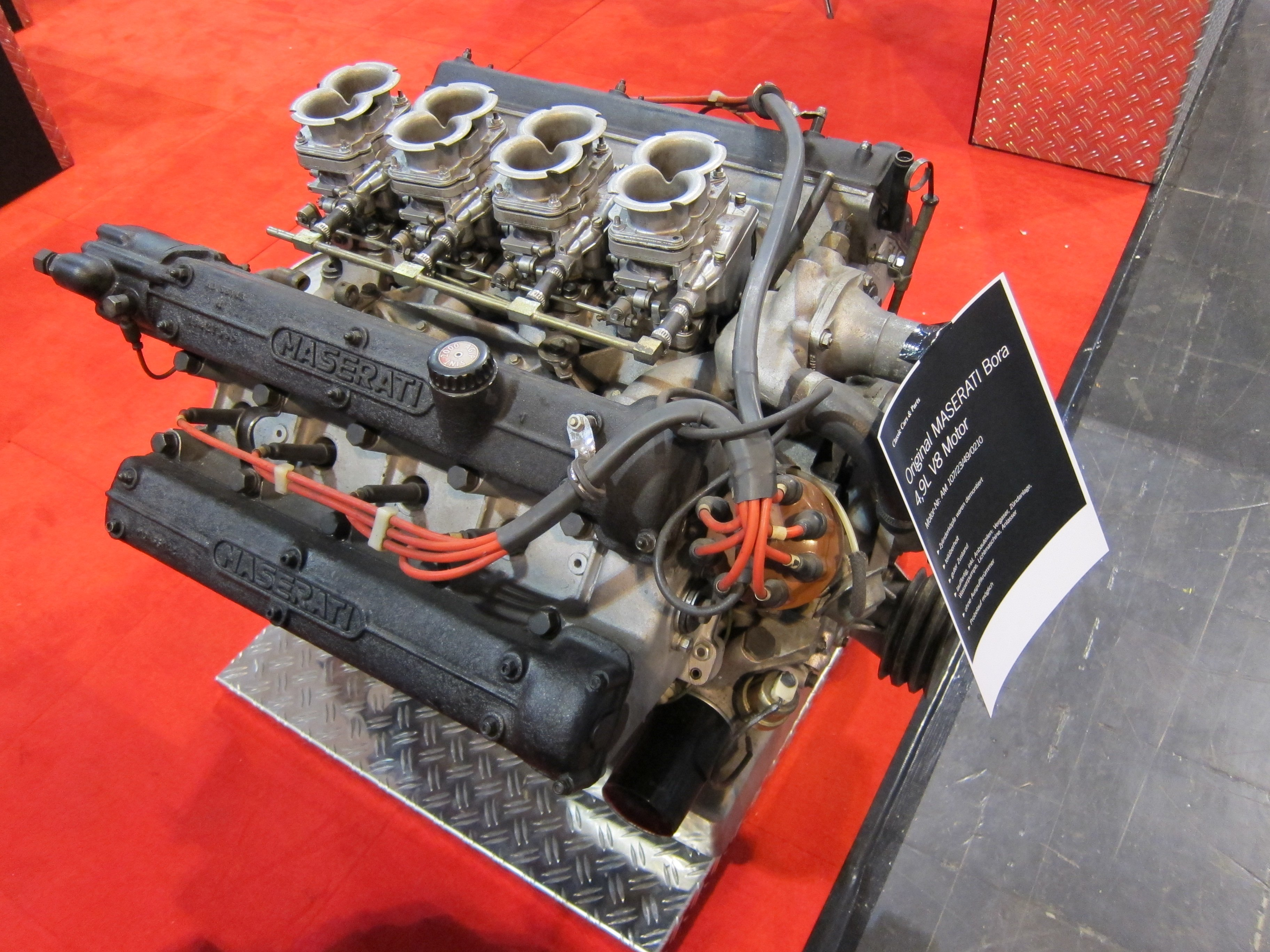
Maserati Bora motor

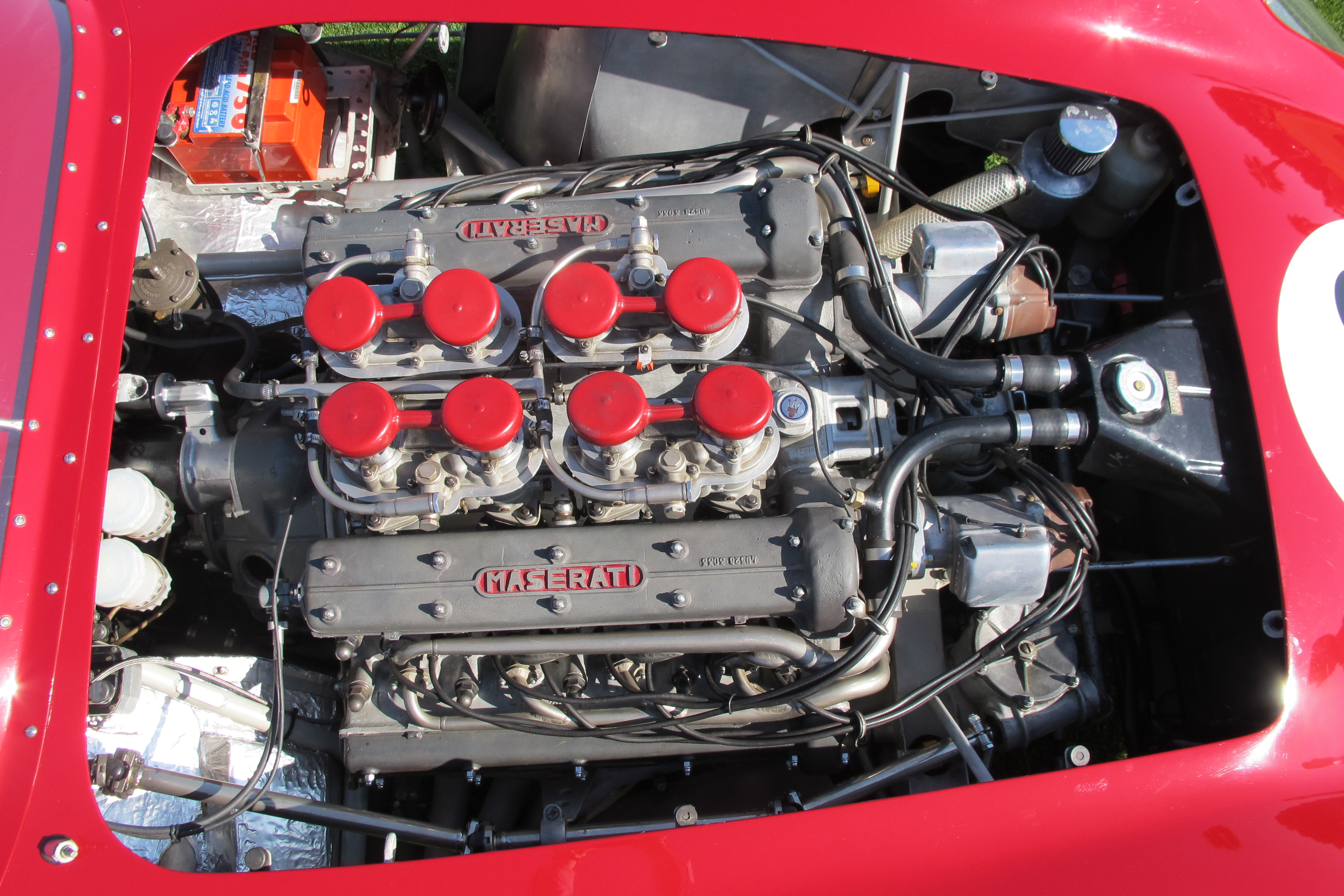
Maserati 450S racing motor

- Maserati V8RI (4.8L)
- Maserati 5000 GT (4.9L)
- Maserati 450S (4.5L)
- Maserati Tipo 151 (4.0, 4.9 or 5.0)
- Maserati Ghibli (4.7L AM 115 or 4.9L AM 115/49)
- Maserati Bora (4.7L AM 107.07 or 4.9L AM 107.16)
- Maserati Quattroporte I (4.1L AM 107 or 4.7L AM 107/1)
- Maserati Quattroporte III (4.2L AM 107.21 or 4.9L AM 107.23)
- Maserati Indy (4.2L AM 107, 4.7L AM 107/1 or 4.9L AM 107/49)
- Maserati Mexico (4.2L AM 107 or 4.7L AM 107/1)
- Maserati Kyalami (4.2L AM 107.21.42 or 4.9L AM 107.23.49)
- Maserati Khamsin (4.9L AM 115.10.49)
- Maserati Shamal (3.2L twin-turbo AM 479)
- Maserati Quattroporte IV (3.2L twin-turbo AM 578)
- Maserati 3200 GT (3.2L twin-turbo AM 585)
