= Enrico Fumia =

Italian automobile and product designer (born 1948)

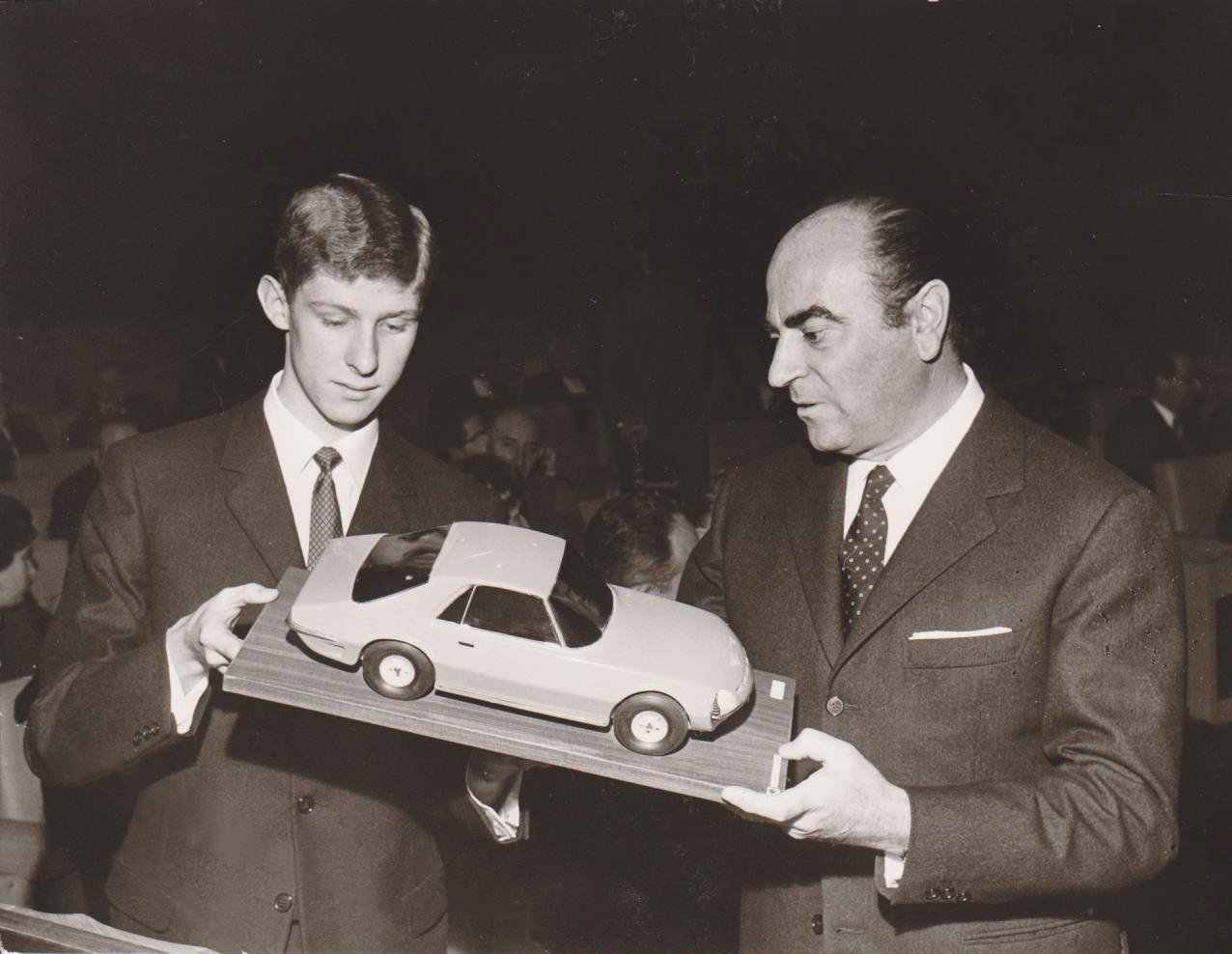
Fumia (left) with "Grifo d'Oro" and Nuccio Bertone (right), in 1966.

Enrico Fumia (born 16 May 1948) is an Italian automobile and product designer. He is widely known for his work with the car design firm Pininfarina, helping to design and package a new sports car version of the Alfa Romeo, which included front-wheel drive and traversely-mounted engines. Today he runs Fumia Design Studio.

== Career ==
- 1966: Fumia wins a Grifo d'Oro Bertone Design competition at age 18. Also this year he is responsible for a front end design of a Siata Spring
- 1967: Collaboration with Italian magazines Mark 3 and Autosprint.
- 1970: Collaboration with Count Mario Revelli di Beaumont's Office.
- 1976: Graduated Aeronautic Engineer at the Politecnico of Turin with an experimental thesis about vehicle's aerodynamics tested at the Pininfarina Wind Tunnel. Same year hired by Pininfarina - in charge of Styling and Industrial Design, Pre-engineering, Models and Prototyping manufacturing.
- 1982: Manager at Pininfarina R&D - Models and Prototypes Development.
- 1988: Manager at Pininfarina R&D - Design and Development.
- 1989: Deputy General Manager at Pininfarina R&D.
- 1991: Director of Centro Stile Lancia at Fiat Auto.
- 1996: Director of Diversified Design at Fiat Auto.
- 1999: Partnership with A. Sessano at Master Design Intl.
- 2002: Fumia Design Associati - Design & Engineering Studio.
- 2009: Fumia Design Studio - Creative Design Studio.

== Notable car designs ==
- 1966 - Grifo D'Oro Bertone
- 1966 - Siata Spring (front end)
- 1977 - Menarini SL (dashboard)
- 1981 - Audi Quartz concept
- 1981 - Fiat Coupé Brio concept
- 1982 - Alfa Romeo 164
- 1987 - Alfa Romeo GTV and Spider, presented in 1994 and 1995.
- 1988 - Ferrari F90
- 1992 - Lancia Y
- 1992 - Lancia Lybra (partially)
- 1995 - Maserati 3200GT and Spyder - Coupé (Interiors)
- 1996 - Lancia Kappa Coupé
- 2005 - Chery QQme (also known as Chery S16)

== Gallery ==
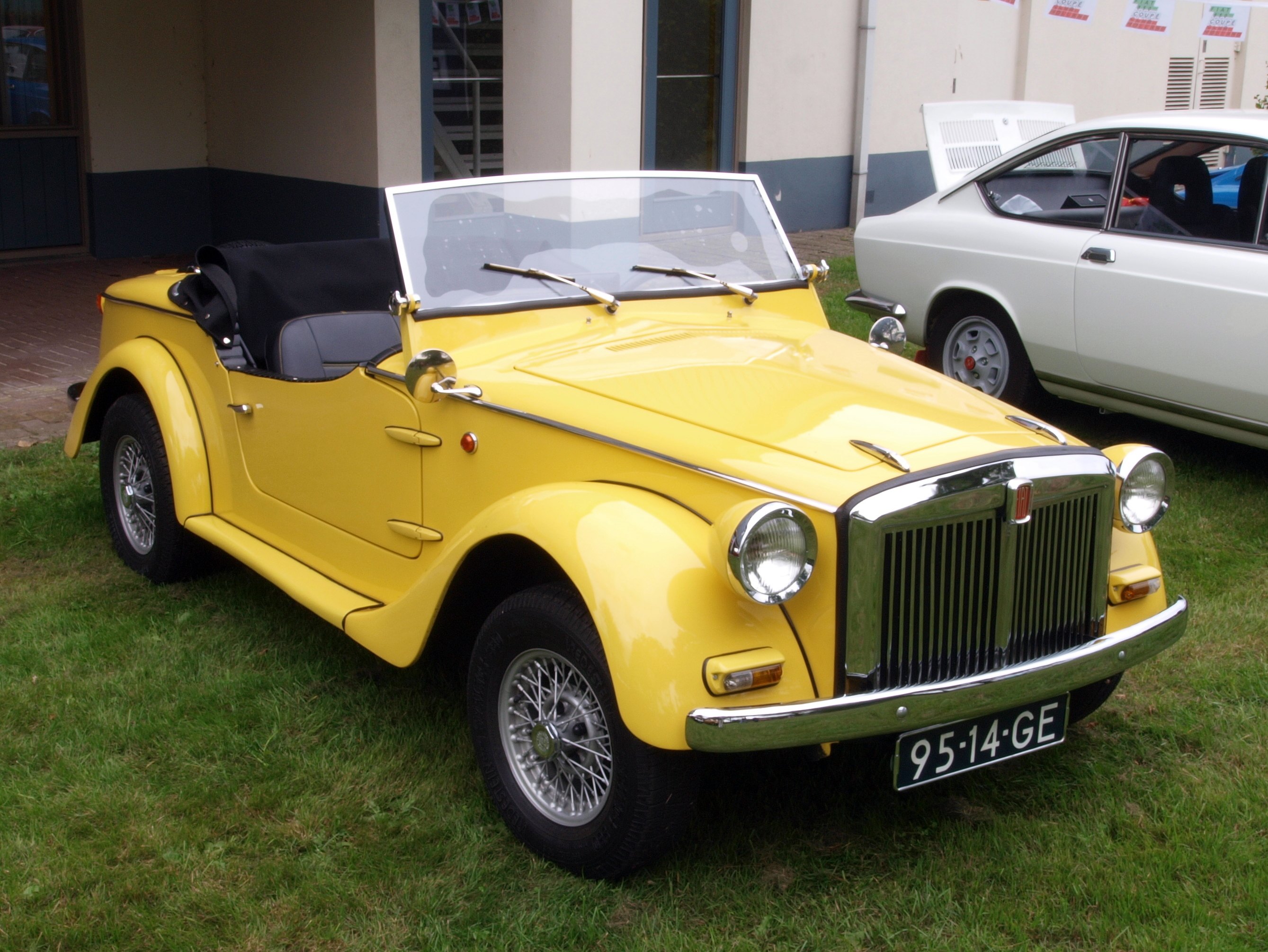
Siata Spring

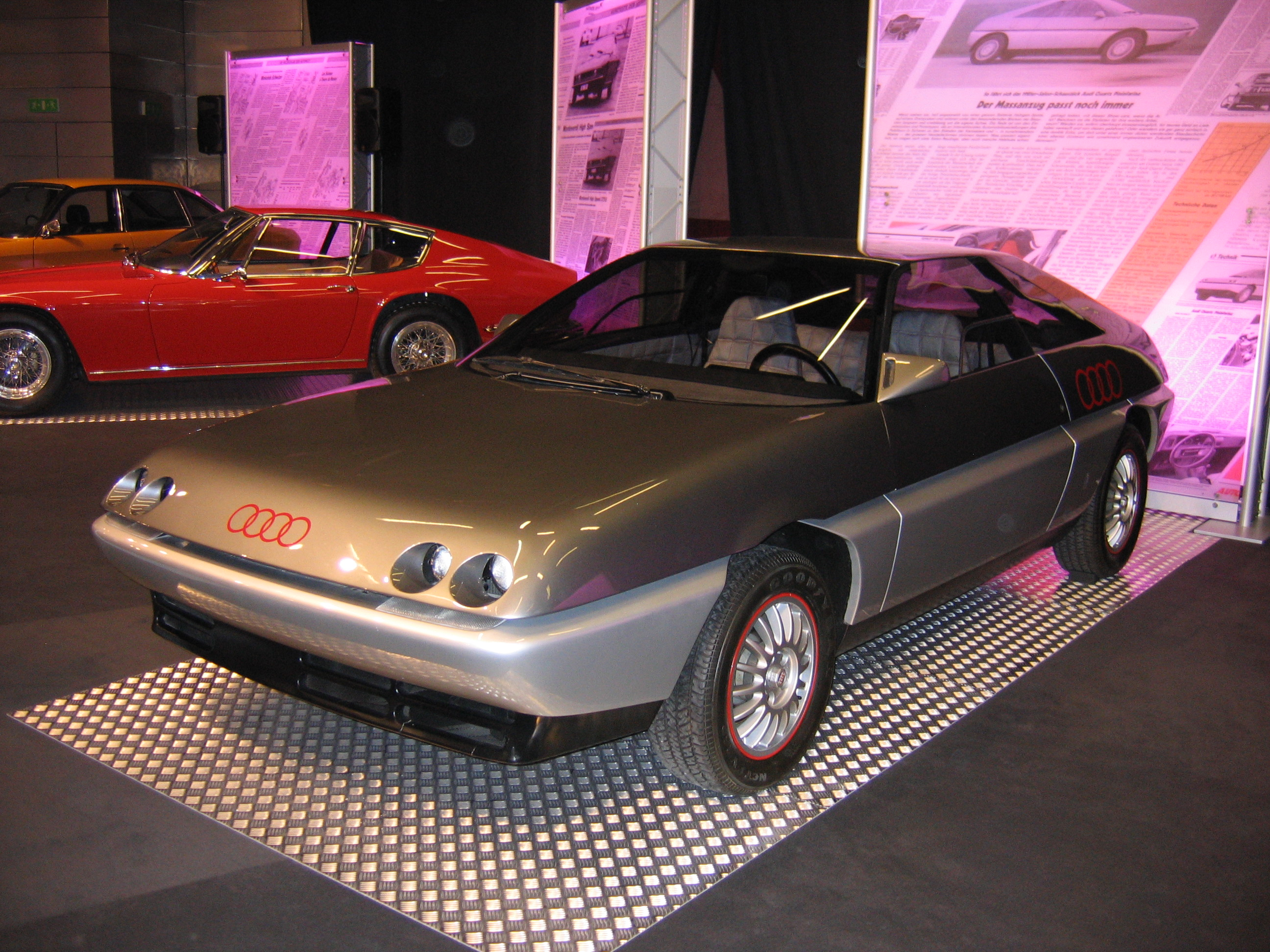
Audi Quartz

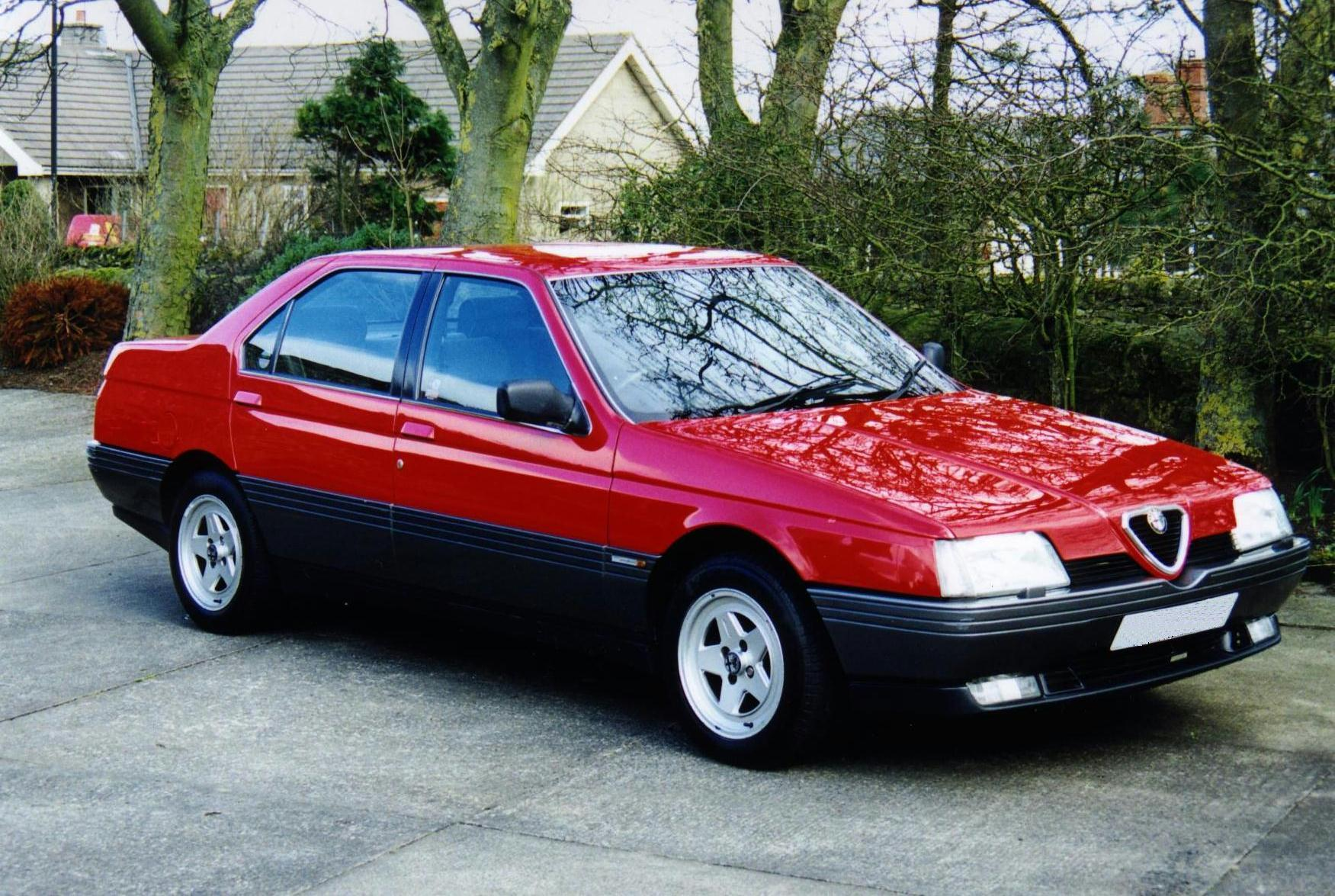
Alfa Romeo 164

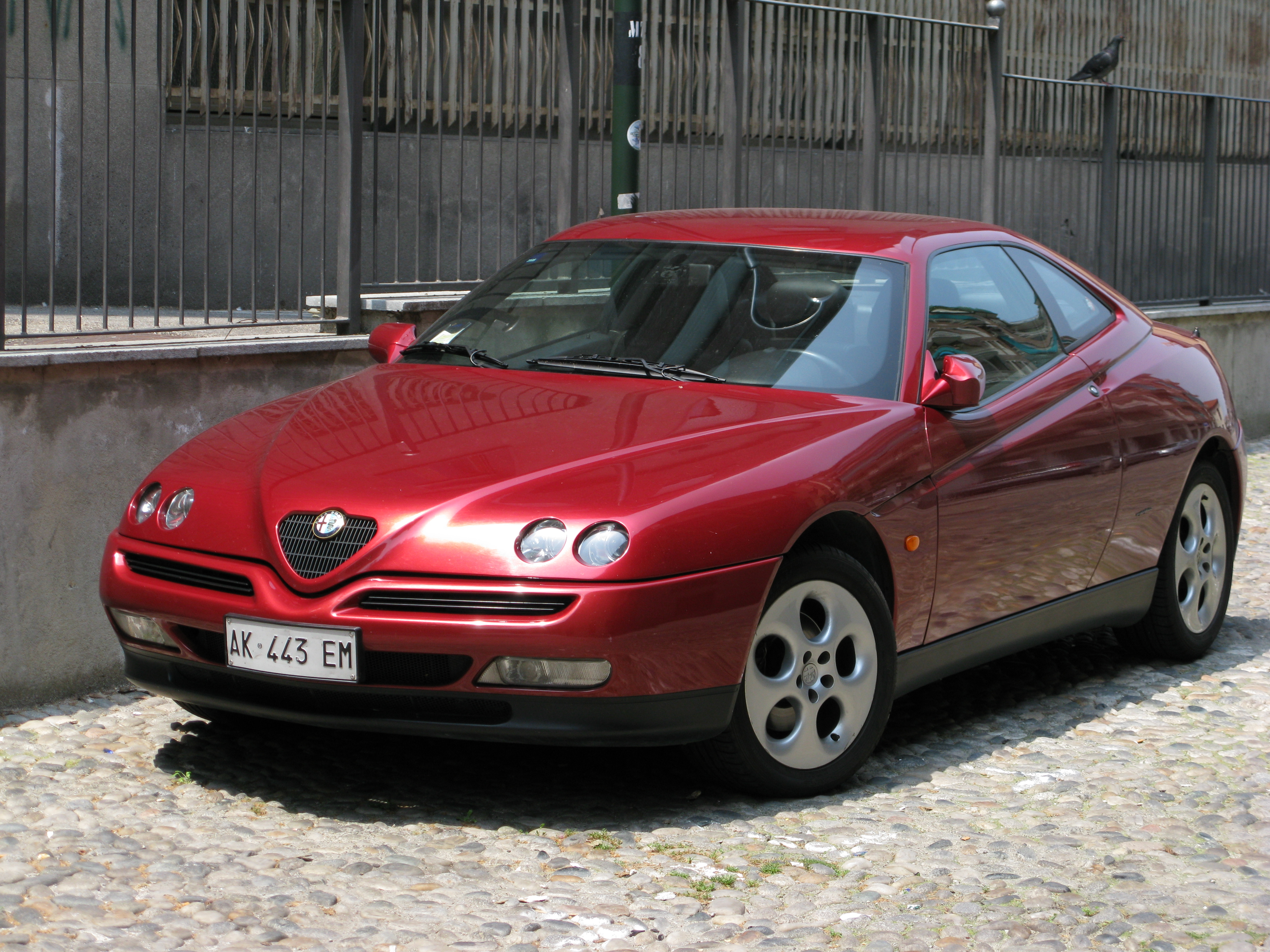
Alfa Romeo GTV

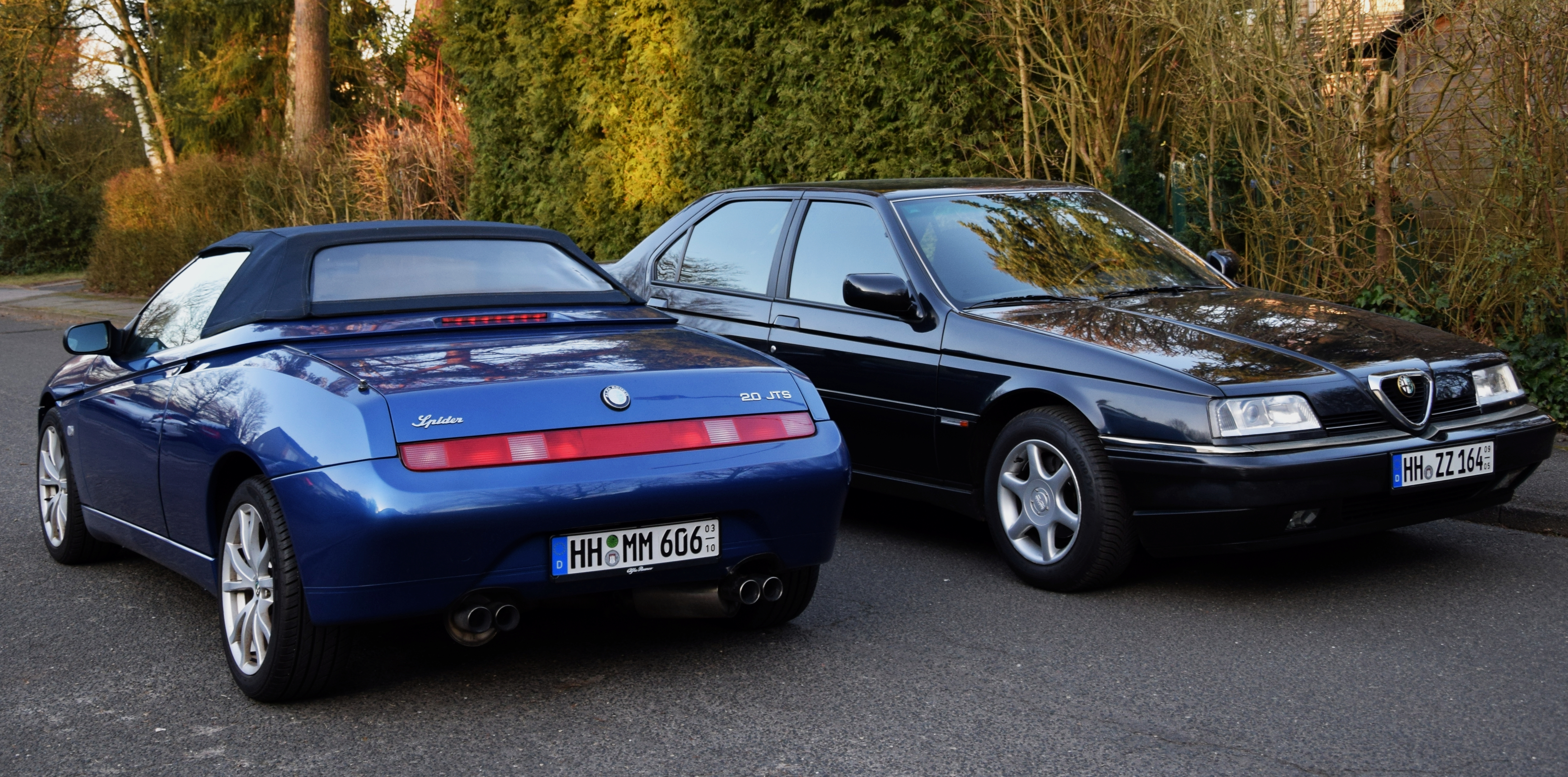
Spider and 164

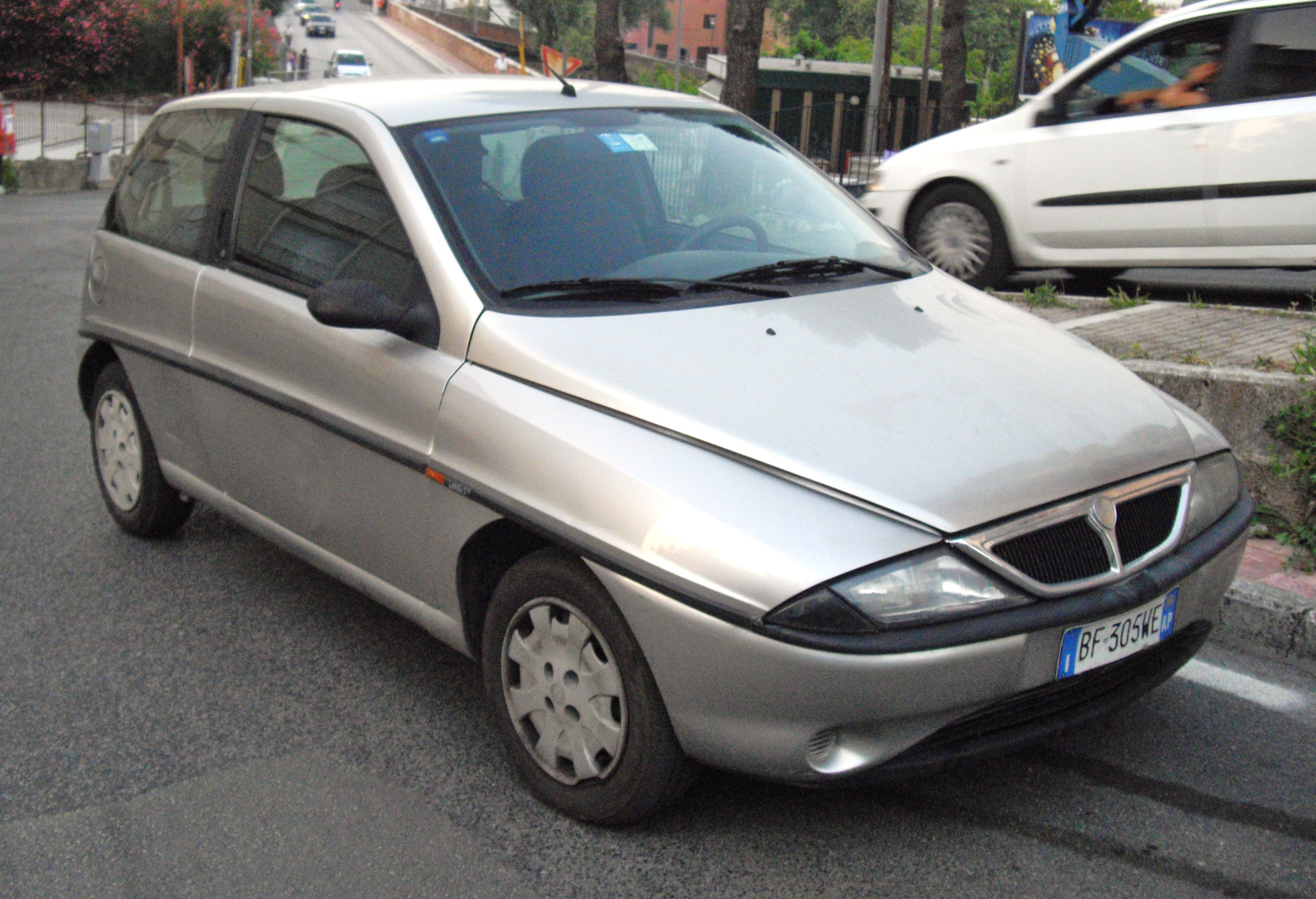
Lancia Y

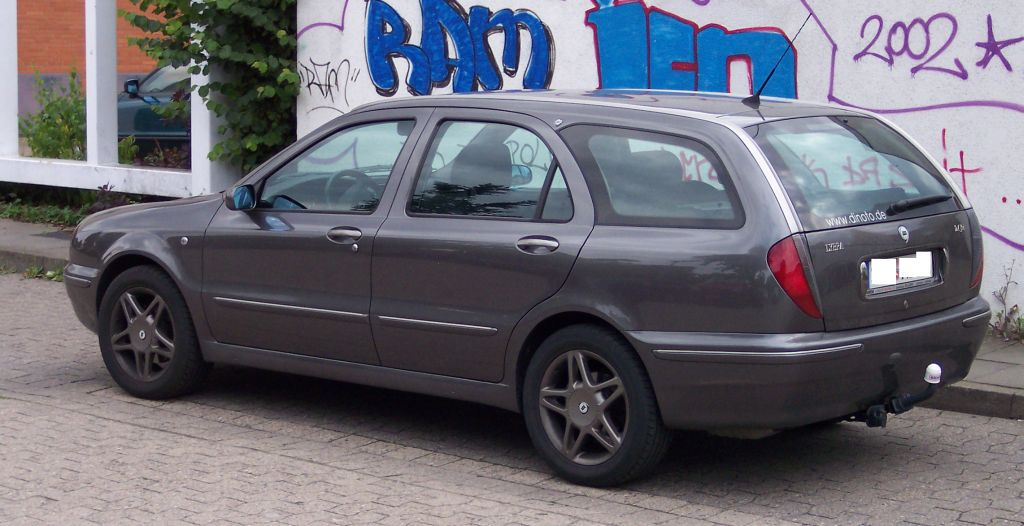
Lancia Lybra SW

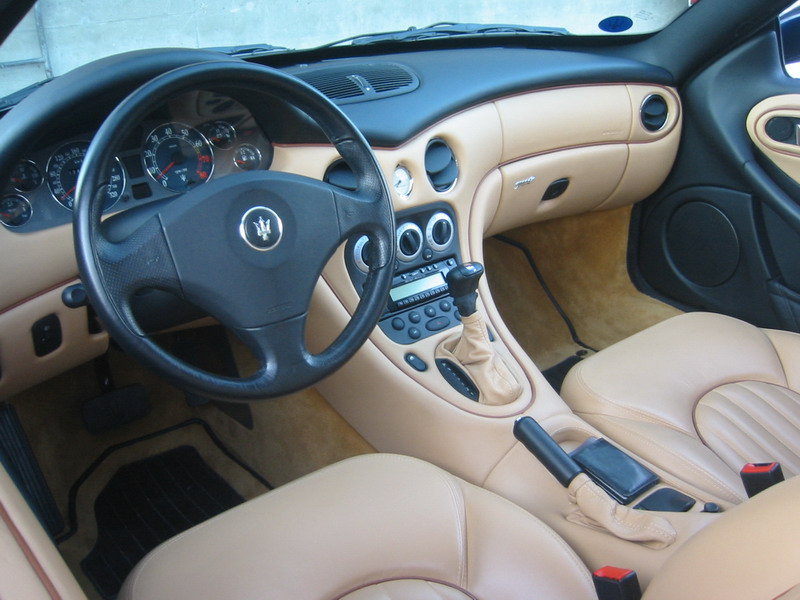
Maserati 3200 GT Interior
