= Maserati Ghibli =

Car models sold by Italian automobile manufacturer Maserati

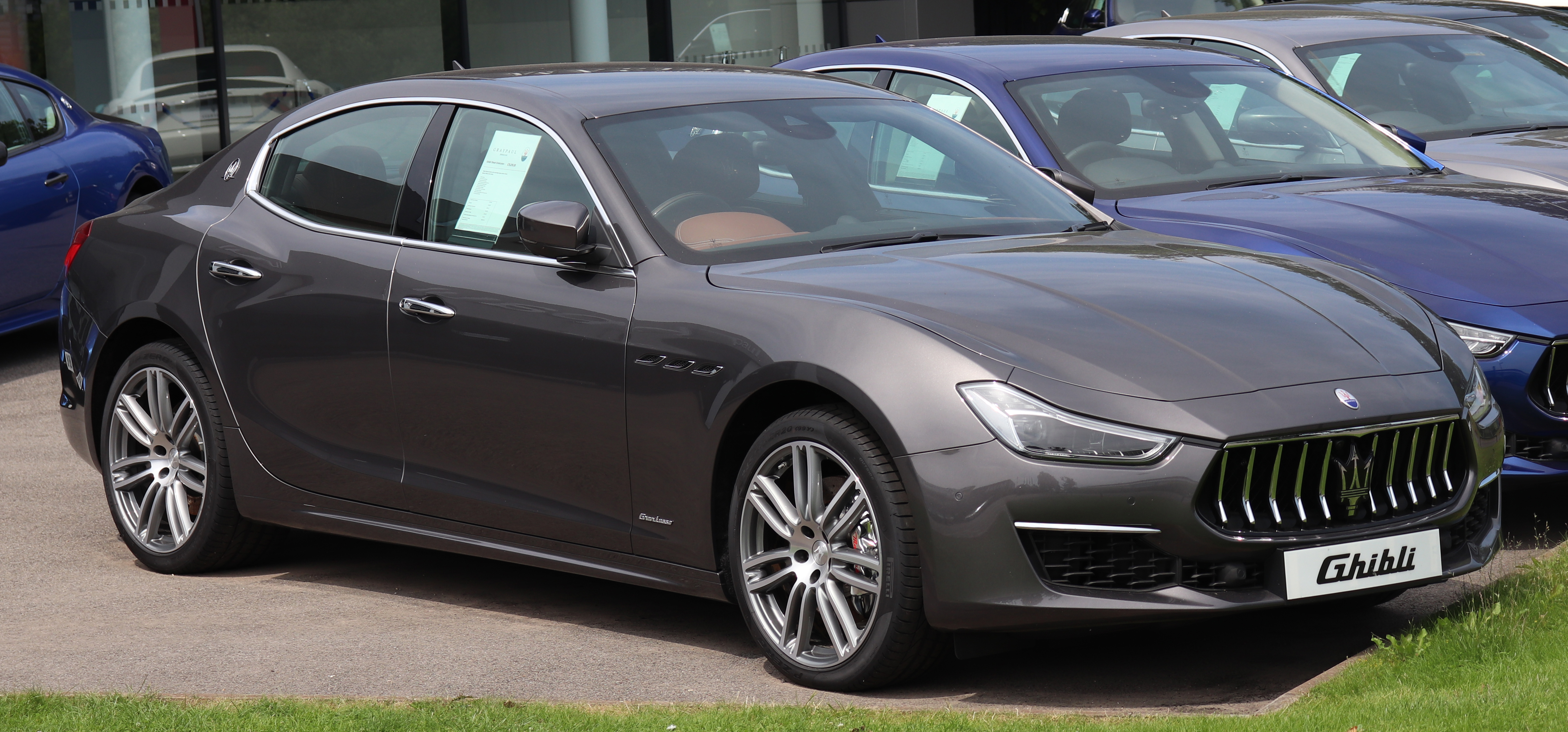
- 2018 Maserati Ghibli GranLusso

Overview
- Manufacturer: Maserati
- Production: AM115: 1967–1973; AM336: 1992–1998; M157: 2013–2023
- Assembly: Italy: Modena (1967–1998); Italy: Grugliasco, Turin ("Avv. Giovanni Agnelli" plant: 2013–2022); Italy: Turin (Stabilimento Mirafiori: 2022–2023)

Body and chassis
- Class: Grand tourer (S) (1967–1998); Executive car (E) (2013–2023)
- Body style: 2-door fastback coupé (AM115); 2-door coupé (AM336); 2-door roadster (AM115); 4-door saloon (M157)

Maserati Ghibli is the name of three different cars produced by Italian automobile manufacturer Maserati: the AM115, a V8 grand tourer from 1967 to 1973; the AM336, a V6 twin-turbocharged coupé from 1992 to 1998; and the M157, an executive saloon from 2013 to 2023.

Ghibli is the Libyan Arabic name for the hot dry south-westerly wind of the Libyan Desert.

== Ghibli (AM115) ==
Maserati Ghibli
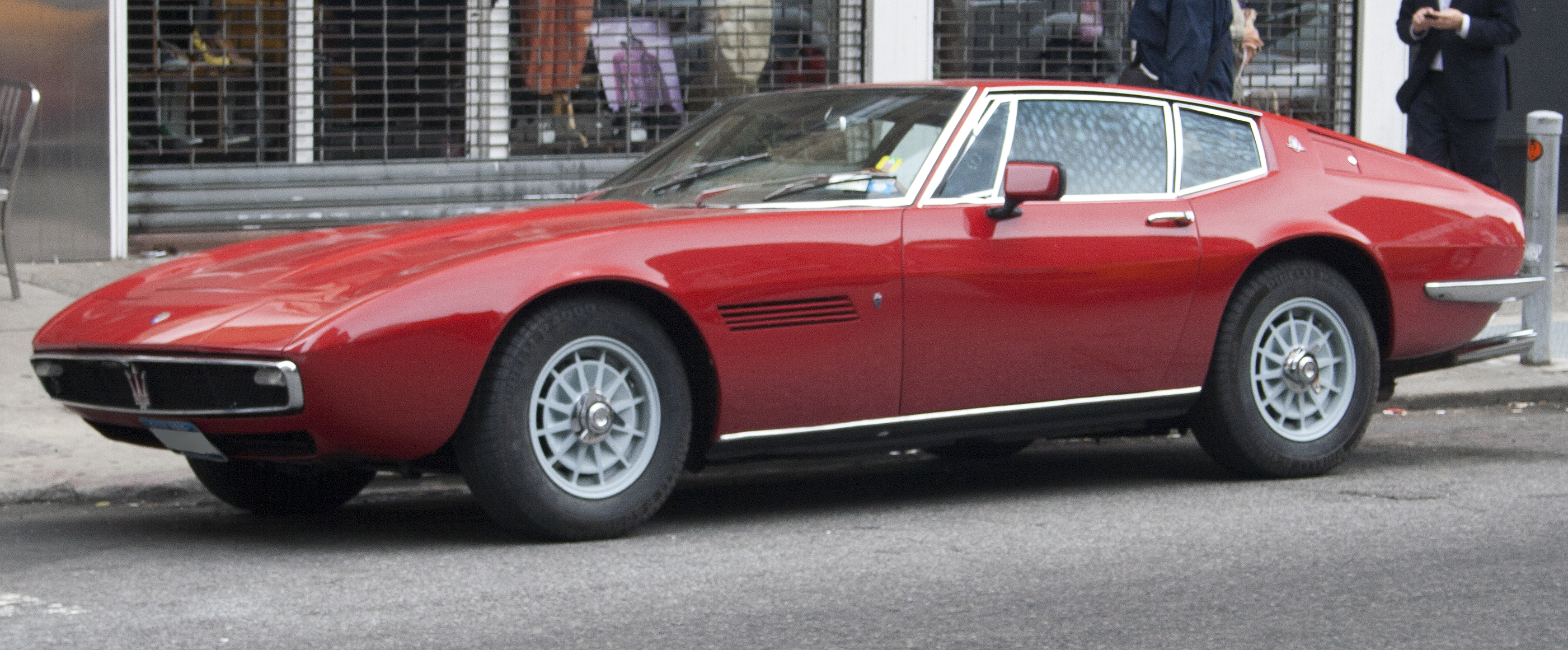

Overview
- Production: 1967–1973; 1,295 produced
- Designer: Giorgetto Giugiaro at Ghia

Body and chassis
- Body style: 2-door fastback coupé; 2-door roadster
- Layout: Front-engine, rear-wheel-drive

Powertrain
- Engine: 4.7 L Tipo AM 115 V8; 4.9 L Tipo AM 115/49 V8
- Transmission: 5-speed ZF manual; 3-speed automatic (to order)

Dimensions
- Wheelbase: 2,550 mm (100.4 in)
- Length: 4,700 mm (185.0 in)
- Width: 1,790 mm (70.5 in)
- Height: 1,160 mm (45.7 in)
- Kerb weight: 1,650–1,770 kg (3,638–3,902 lb)

Chronology
- Predecessor: Maserati 5000GT; Maserati Mistral
- Successor: Maserati Khamsin

The original Ghibli (Tipo AM115) is a two-door, 2+2 V8-engined grand tourer. American magazine Sports Car International named it number nine on its list of Top Sports Cars of the 1960s.

=== History ===
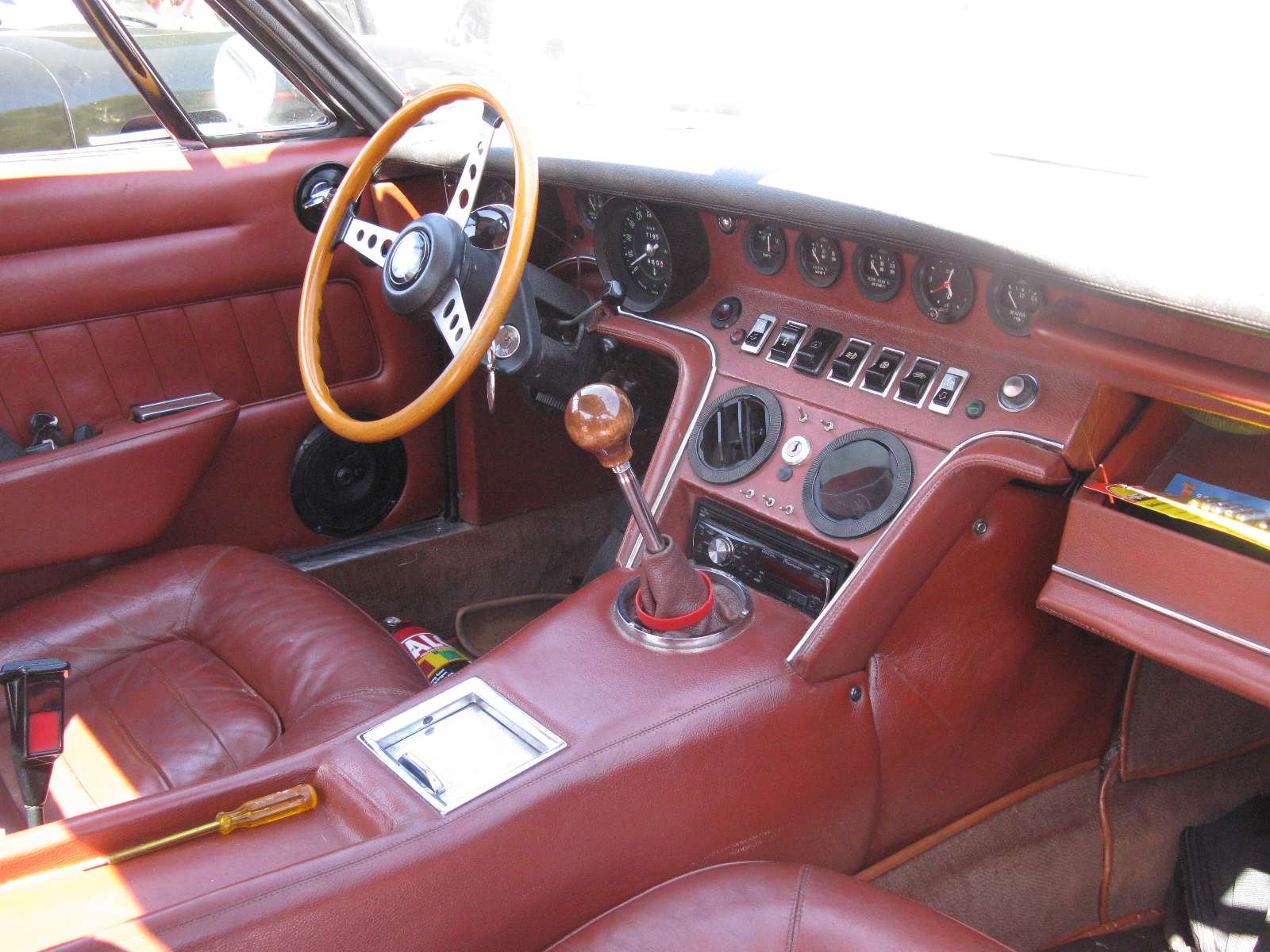
Interior

The Ghibli was first unveiled as a 2-seater concept car at the November 1966 Turin Motor Show. Its steel body, characterized by a low, shark-shaped nose, was designed by a young Giorgetto Giugiaro, then working at Ghia. The car featured pop-up headlamps, leather front sport seats, alloy wheels and 205R15 Pirelli Cinturato N72 tyres. Two rear seats consisting of nothing more than a cushion without a backrest were added to the production model, allowing the Ghibli to be marketed as a 2-door 2+2 fastback coupé. Deliveries started in March 1967.

The car was powered by a front placed quad-cam 4,719 cc (4.7 L; 288.0 cu in) dry sump V8 engine mated to a five-speed ZF manual transmission, with a three-speed automatic transmission being optional. The engine had a power output of 310 PS (228 kW; 306 hp). It had a 0–97 km/h (0–60 mph) time of 6.8 seconds and a top speed of 250 km/h (155 mph).

==== Spyder ====
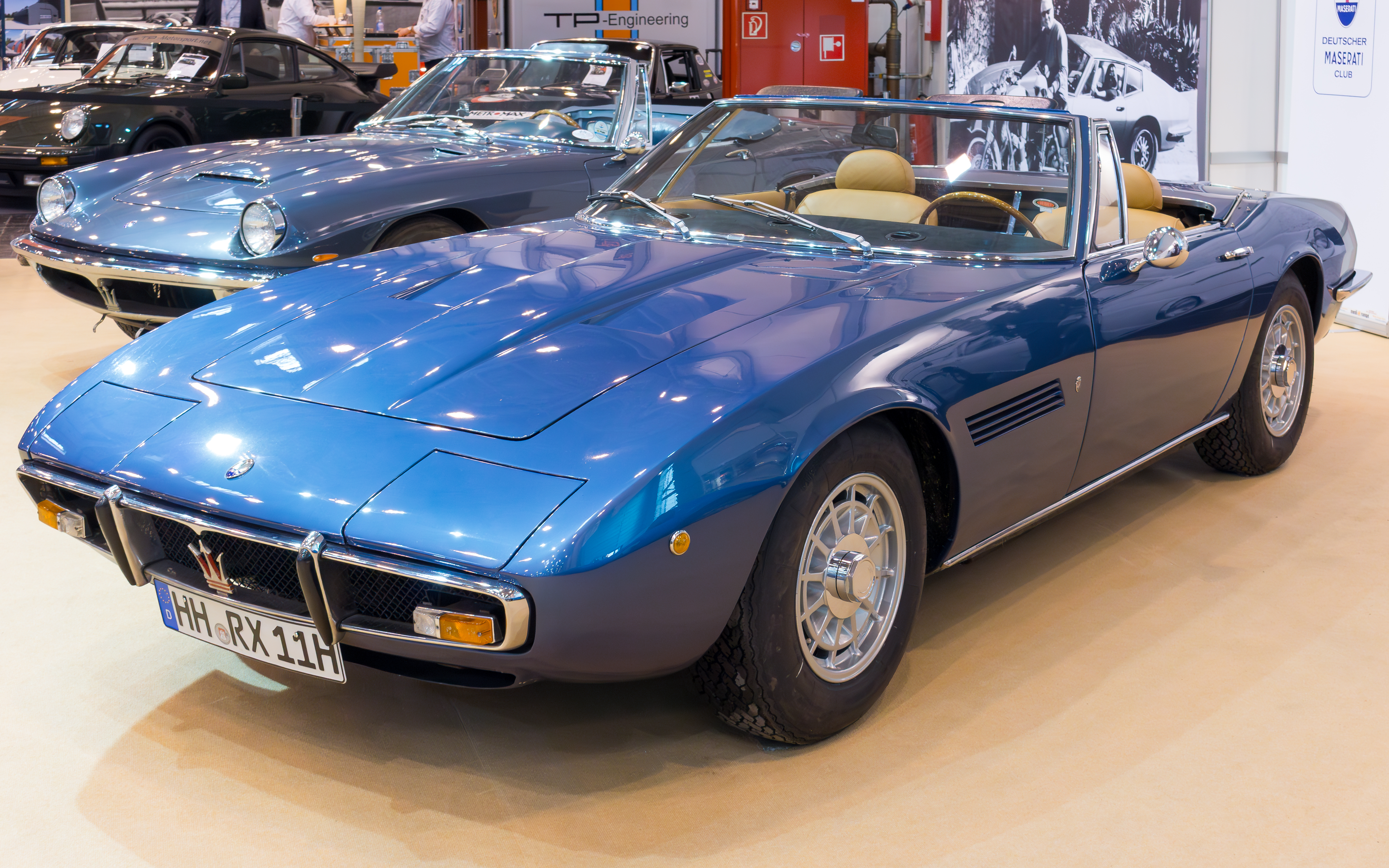
1969 Ghibli Spyder

The 2-seat Ghibli Spyder went into production in 1969. Its convertible top folded under a flush fitting body-colour tonneau cover behind the front seats. A detachable hardtop was available as an option.

==== Ghibli SS ====
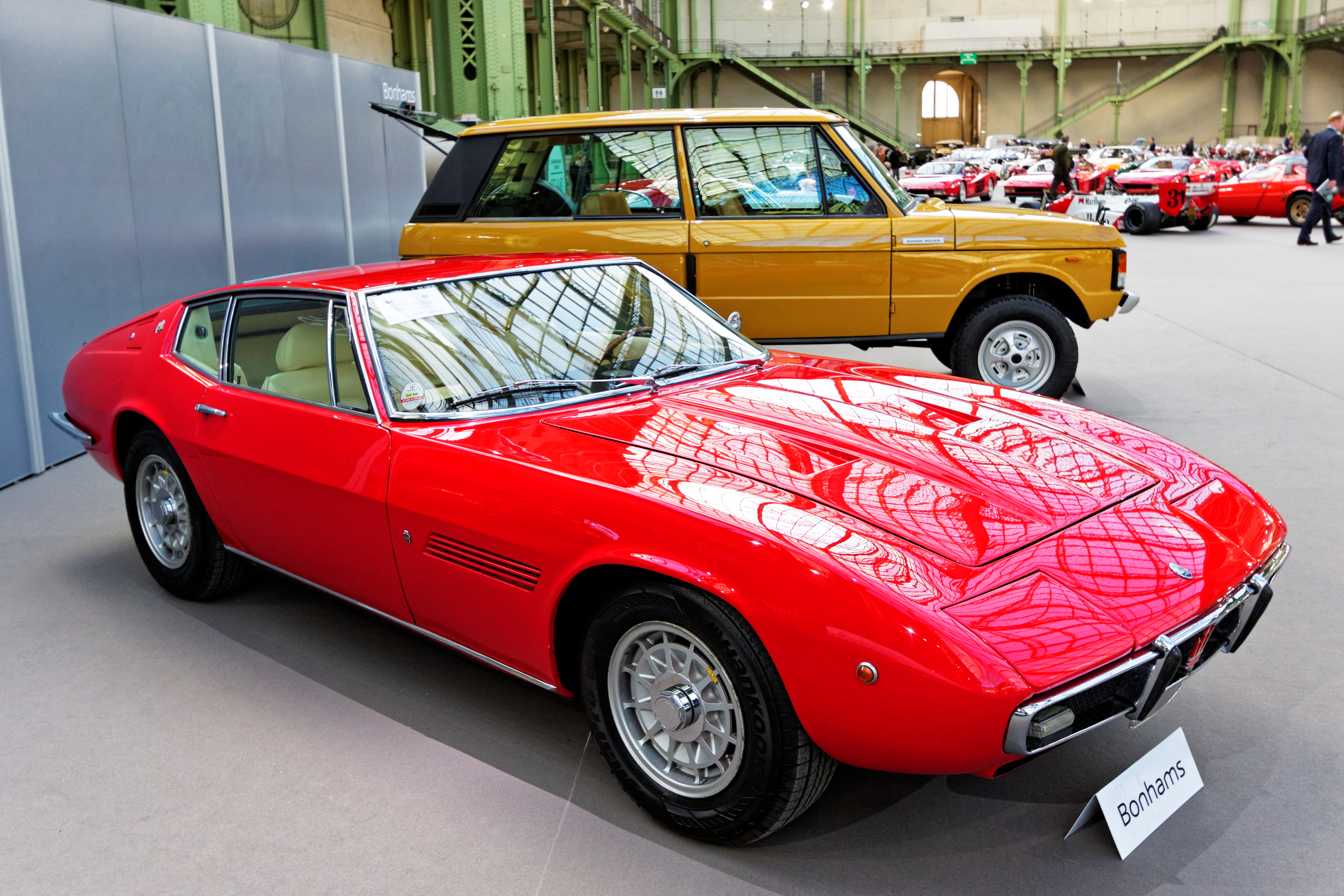
1970 Maserati Ghibli 4.9 litre SS coupé

The Ghibli SS was introduced in 1969. Its new engine was stroked up by 4 mm (0.16 in) to displace 4,930 cc (4.9 L; 300.8 cu in) and was rated at 335 PS (246 kW; 330 hp) at 5,500 rpm and 481 N⋅m (355 lbf⋅ft) of torque at 4,000 rpm. Its top speed of 280 km/h (174 mph) made it the fastest Maserati road car ever produced at the time. SS models have an additional /49 designation (ex. AM115/49). A Spyder version was introduced in the same year. Total production amounted to 45 Spyders and 425 coupés.

==== Production ====
In all, 1,170 coupés and 125 Spyders (including 45 Spyder SS) were produced. The Ghibli went out of production in 1973; it was succeeded the following year by the Bertone-designed Khamsin.

=== Specifications ===
The Ghibli used a tubular frame with a spot welded on body. Front suspension used double wishbone type, coaxial dampers and coil springs, and an anti-roll bar. At the rear there was a live axle on semi-elliptic springs, with a single longitudinal torque arm, hydraulic dampers and an anti-roll bar. Magnesium wheels were standard, originally fitted with Pirelli Cinturato 205 VR15 tyres (CN72) until 1972 when it changed to 215/70VR15 Pirelli Cinturato CN12, while Borrani wire wheels were optional. Even by the standards of its time and class, the car consumed copious volumes of fuel, but Maserati fitted the car with two independent 50 L (13.2 US gal; 11.0 imp gal) fuel tanks, which could be filled via flaps on either side of the roof pillars.

Engines and performance
Model	Engine type	Displacement	Power	Torque	Fuel system
Ghibli	V8 DOHC	4,719 cc (4.7 L; 288.0 cu in)	310 PS (228 kW; 306 hp)	393 N⋅m; 290 lbf⋅ft (40.1 kg⋅m)	4× vertical twin-choke Weber carburetors 40 DCNF/5 (42 DCNF/9 from 1969)
Ghibli SS	V8 DOHC	4,930 cc (4.9 L; 300.8 cu in)	335 PS (246 kW; 330 hp)	481 N⋅m; 354 lbf⋅ft (49 kg⋅m)	4× vertical twin-choke Weber carburetors 42 DCNF/11

== Ghibli (AM336) ==
Maserati Ghibli
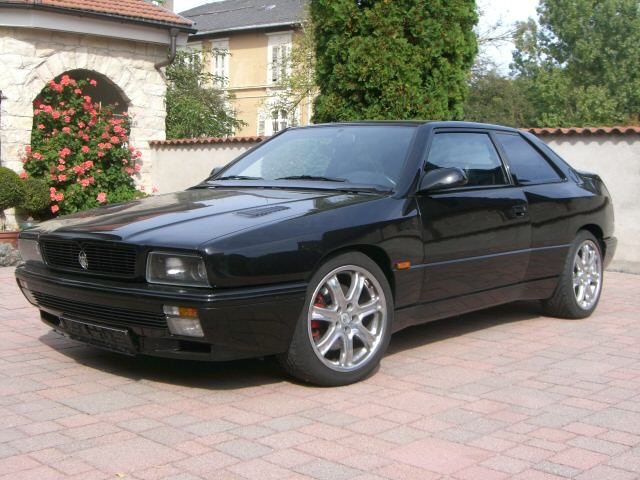

Overview
- Production: 1992–1998; 2,337 produced
- Designer: Marcello Gandini

Body and chassis
- Body style: 2-door coupé
- Layout: Front-engine, rear-wheel-drive
- Related: Maserati Biturbo

Powertrain
- Engine: 2.0 L AM 496 twin-turbocharged 90° V6; 2.8 L AM 574 twin-turbocharged 90° V6
- Transmission: 5-speed ZF manual; 6-speed Getrag manual; 4-speed automatic

Dimensions
- Wheelbase: 2,514 mm (99.0 in)
- Length: 4,223 mm (166.3 in)
- Width: 1,775 mm (69.9 in)
- Height: 1,300 mm (51.2 in)
- Kerb weight: 1,365–1,406 kg (3,009–3,100 lb)

Chronology
- Predecessor: Maserati Biturbo Coupe
- Successor: Maserati 3200 GT

The Ghibli name was resurrected with the unveiling of the 1992 Ghibli (Tipo AM336), a two-door, four-seater coupé offered with twin-turbocharged V6 engines. Like the V8 Shamal flagship, it was an evolution of the previous Biturbo coupés; the interior and basic bodyshell were carried over from the Biturbo.

=== History ===
The Ghibli was launched at the 62nd Turin Motor Show in April 1992. The Ghibli was powered by updated 24-valve twin-turbocharged engines which had seen use on the Biturbo range: a 2.0-litre V6 coupled to a six-speed manual transmission for the Italian market, and a 2.8-litre V6 for export, at first coupled with a 5-speed manual, then from 1995 with the 6-speed manual. A 4-speed automatic was optional. The coupé was built for luxury as well as performance, and its interior featured Connolly leather upholstery and burr elm trim.

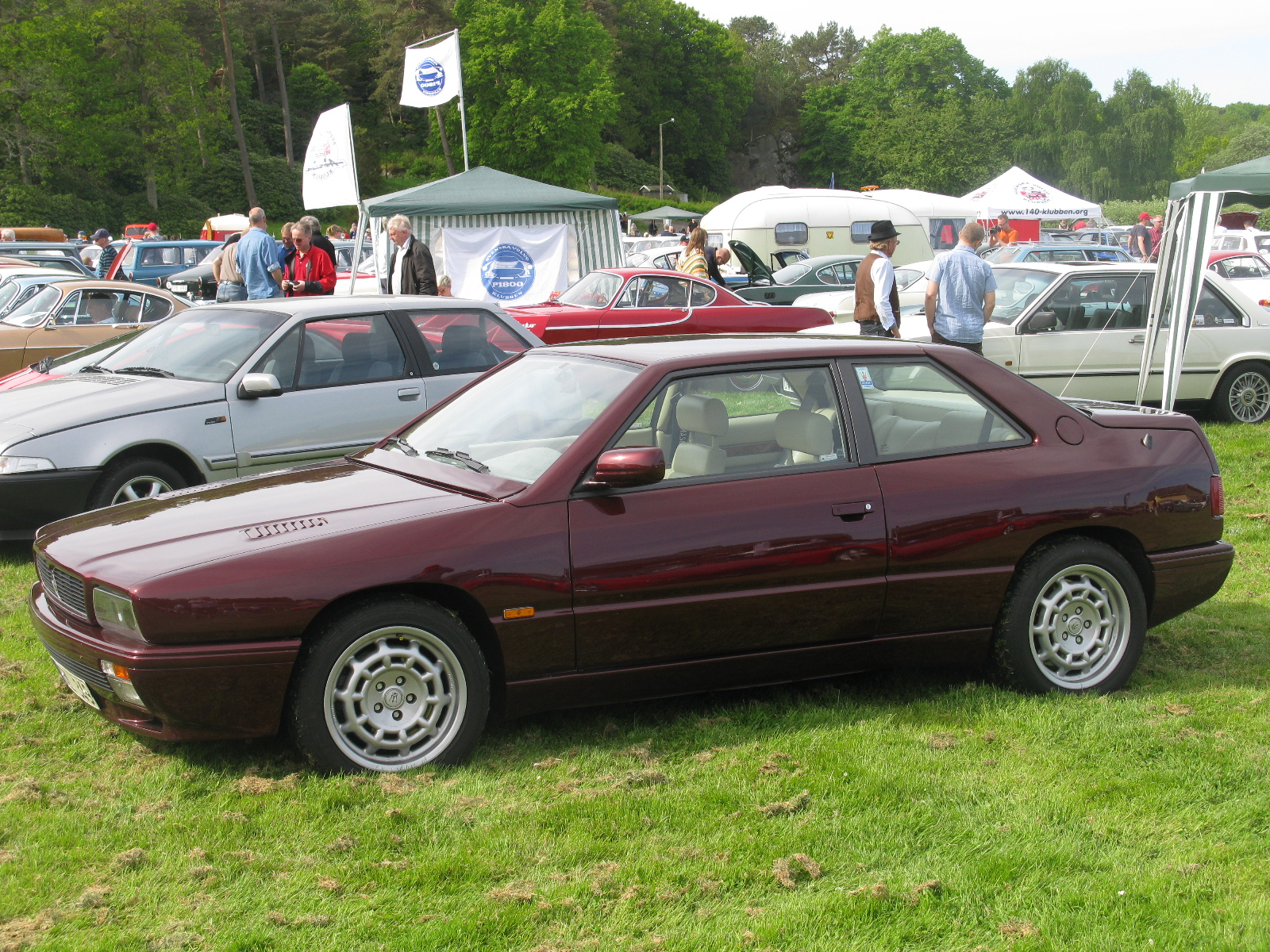
1994 Ghibli

At the 1994 Geneva Motor Show, Maserati launched an updated Ghibli. A refreshed interior, new wing mirrors, wider and larger 17-inch alloy wheels of a new design, fully adjustable electronic suspension and ABS brakes were added. The Ghibli Open Cup single-make racing car was announced in late 1994.

Two sport versions were introduced in 1995. The first was the Ghibli Kit Sportivo, whose namesake handling kit included wider tyres on OZ "Futura III" split-rim wheels, specific springs, dampers and anti-roll bars. The second was the limited edition Ghibli Cup, which brought some features of the Open Cup racer into a road-going model; it debuted at the December 1995 Bologna Motor Show. It has a 2.0 L (1,996 cc) engine rated at 330 PS (243 kW; 325 hp).

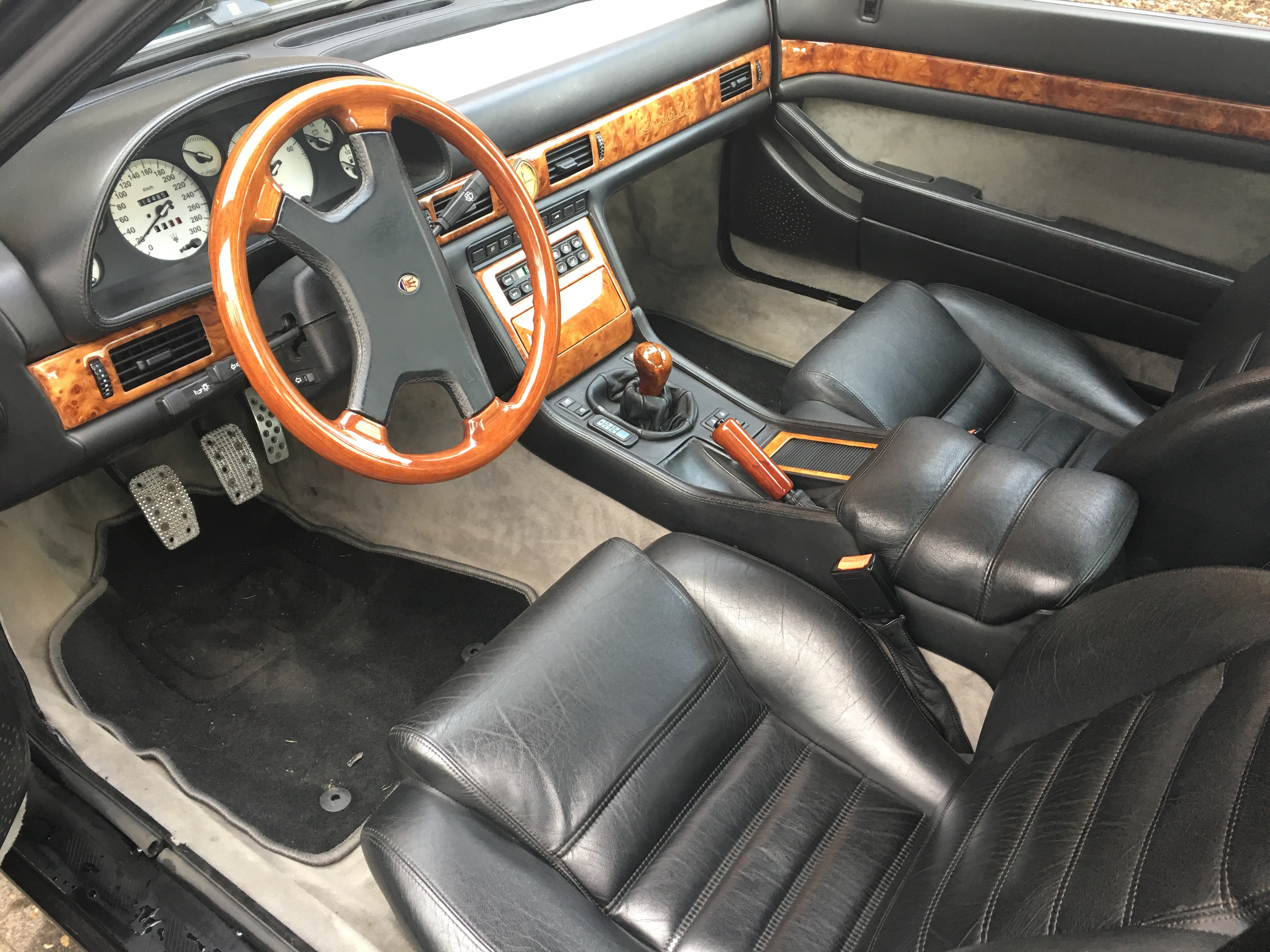
Interior

At the time the Ghibli Cup had the highest ever specific power output of any street legal car at 163.0 hp; 121.6 kW (165.3 PS) per litre, surpassing the Bugatti EB110 and Jaguar XJ220. Chassis upgrades included tweaked suspension and Brembo brakes. Visually the Cup was recognisable from its 5-spoke split-rim Speedline wheels and badges on the doors. Only four exterior colours were available: red, white, yellow and French blue. The sporty theme continued in the Cup's cabin with black leather, carbon fibre trim, aluminium pedals and a MOMO steering wheel.

==== Ghibli GT ====
A second round of improvements resulted in the Ghibli GT in 1996. It was fitted with 7-spoke 17" alloy wheels, black headlight housings, and had suspension and transmission modifications.

On 4 November 1996 on the Lake Lugano, Guido Cappellini broke the flying kilometre's World Speed Record on water in the 5-litre class, piloting a composite-hulled speedboat powered by the biturbo V6 from the Ghibli Cup and belonging to Bruno Abbate's Primatist/Special Team. The boat ran the kilometre at an average speed of 216.703 km/h (134.653 mph). To celebrate the world record Maserati made 60 special edition Ghiblis called the Ghibli Primatist, featuring special Ultramarine blue paintwork and an interior trimmed in two-tone blue/turquoise leather and polished burr walnut trim.

Production of the second generation Ghibli ended in Summer 1998. It was replaced in the Maserati range by the 3200 GT.

=== Ghibli Open Cup ===
A single-make racing series for the Ghibli, the Open Cup, was run two seasons—1995 and 1996. Twenty-five Ghibli Open Cup racing cars were prepared. They were based on the two-litre model, with their tipo AM 577 engines tuned to 320 PS (235 kW; 316 hp) by using roller-bearing turbochargers, a freer-flowing exhaust, and remapped fuel computers; a roll cage, Sparco racing seats, a Momo racing steering wheel, aluminium shifter knob and pedals, 5-point belts, automatic fire extinguishing system, an aluminium sump guard, carbon fibre air-intakes, a modified fuel system and 17-inch 5-spoke Speedline wheels completed the outfitting. In 1995 eight races were held, two in Italy and six across Europe. In 1996, the car received a modification upgrade, resulting in similar track times to those of the Ferrari 355 Challenge. After the end of the 1995 racing season, several of the original 23 cars were used in national GT events.

=== Specifications ===
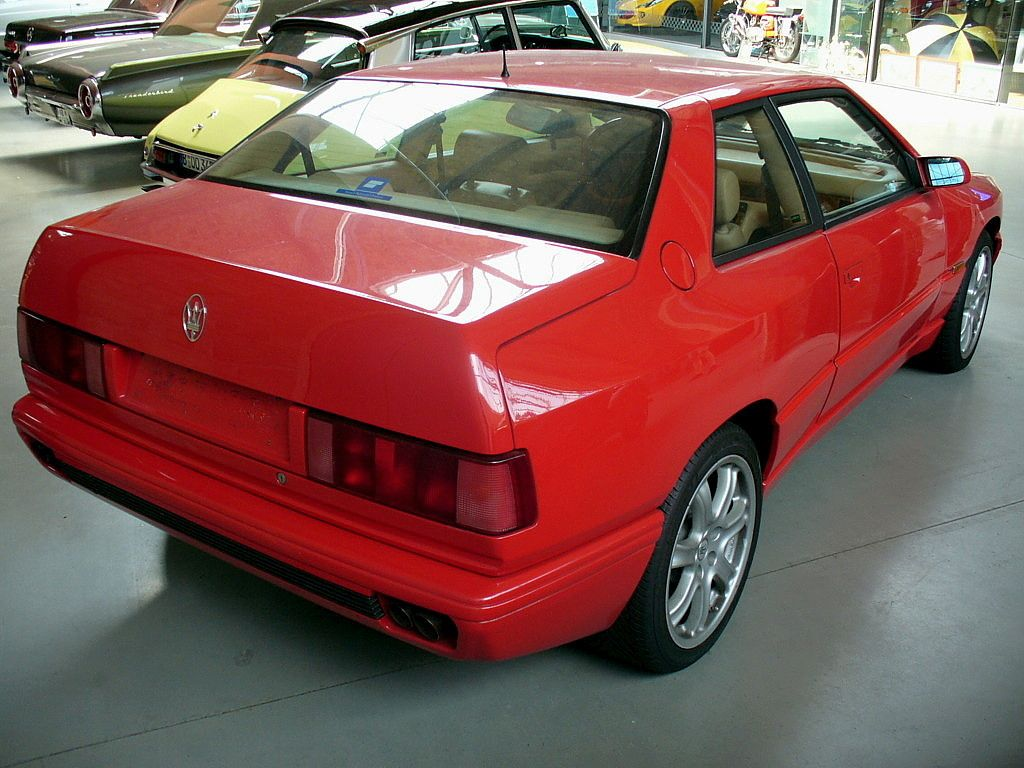
Ghibli GT

Like the Biturbo, the Ghibli had unibody steel construction, with a conventional longitudinally-mounted, front-engine, rear-wheel-drive layout. Suspension was of the MacPherson strut type at the front and semi-trailing arms at the rear, with coil springs, double-acting dampers and anti-roll bars on both axles. The differential and rear suspension arms were supported by a bushing-insulated subframe. It also featured ventilated disc brakes on all four wheels, and steering was servo-assisted rack and pinion.

The engine was the latest evolution of Maserati's all-aluminium alloy, DOHC 4 valves per cylinder 90° V6 engine, fitted with water-cooled IHI twin-turbochargers and two air-to-air intercoolers, one per each cylinder bank. Weber-Magneti Marelli IAW electronic fuel injection and ignition system was used. The gearbox was a Getrag-supplied 6-speed manual transmission from the Shamal on 2-litre cars, while 2.8 litre cars initially used a 5-speed ZF unit and were updated with the Getrag gearbox in 1995. At the rear axle there was Maserati's "Ranger" Torsen limited-slip differential from the Biturbo, with an added oil cooler.

Engines, performance and production numbers
Model	Years	Displacement	Power	Peak torque	Top speed	Acceleration 0–100 km/h (0–62 mph) (seconds)	Notes	Units made
Ghibli 2.0	1992–1998	2.0 L (1,996 cc)	306 PS (225 kW; 302 hp) at 6,250 rpm	373 N⋅m (275 lb⋅ft) at 4,250 rpm	255 km/h (158 mph)	5.7	Italy and Europe only	1,157
Ghibli 2.8	1992–1998	2.8 L (2,790 cc)	284 PS (209 kW; 280 hp) at 6,000 rpm	413 N⋅m (305 lb⋅ft) at 3,500 rpm	250 km/h (155 mph)	6.0		1,063
Ghibli Cup	1996–1997	2.0 L (1,996 cc)	330 PS (243 kW; 325 hp) at 6,500 rpm	373 N⋅m (275 lb⋅ft) at 4,000 rpm	270 km/h (168 mph)	5.6		57
Ghibli Primatist	1996–1997	2.0 L (1,996 cc)	306 PS (225 kW; 302 hp) at 6,250 rpm	373 N⋅m (275 lb⋅ft) at 4,250 rpm	255 km/h (158 mph)	5.7		60

== Ghibli (M157) ==
Maserati Ghibli
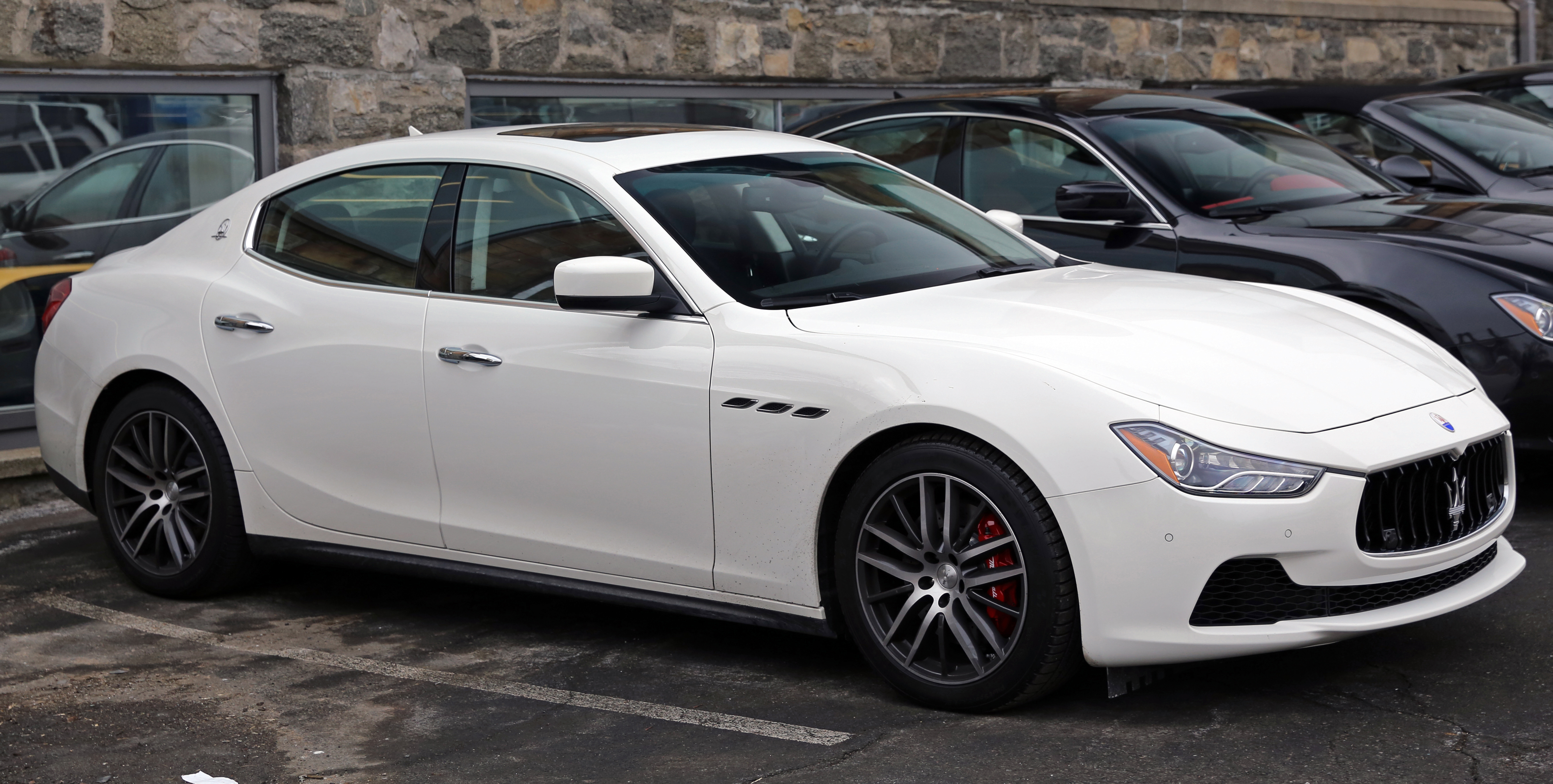

Overview
- Production: 2013–2023

Body and chassis
- Body style: 4-door saloon
- Layout: Front-engine, rear-wheel-drive / four-wheel-drive
- Related: Maserati Quattroporte VI; Maserati Levante

Powertrain
- Engine: petrol: 3.0 L F160 twin-turbo V6; 3.8 L F154 twin-turbo V8; diesel: 3.0 L VM A630 HP turbo V6; MHEV: 2.0 L GME T4 Multiair eTorque turbo I4
- Transmission: 8-speed ZF automatic

Dimensions
- Wheelbase: 2,998 mm (118.0 in)
- Length: 4,971 mm (195.7 in)
- Width: 2,100 mm (82.7 in)
- Height: 1,461 mm (57.5 in)
- Kerb weight: 1,810 kg (3,990 lb)

The most recent, third generation of the Ghibli (Tipo M157) was unveiled at the 2013 Shanghai Motor Show. The Ghibli was offered with three different 3.0-litre V6 engines: a twin-turbocharged 330 PS (243 kW; 325 hp) or 410 PS (302 kW; 404 hp) petrol and a 275 PS (202 kW; 271 hp) turbodiesel, making the Ghibli the first Maserati production car to be available powered by a diesel engine.

An eight-speed automatic transmission was standard on all models; all wheel drive was available with the most powerful V6, although not in right hand drive markets. Production of the third generation Ghibli was halted amidst slumping sales in late 2023.
