= Maserati Ghibli (M157) =

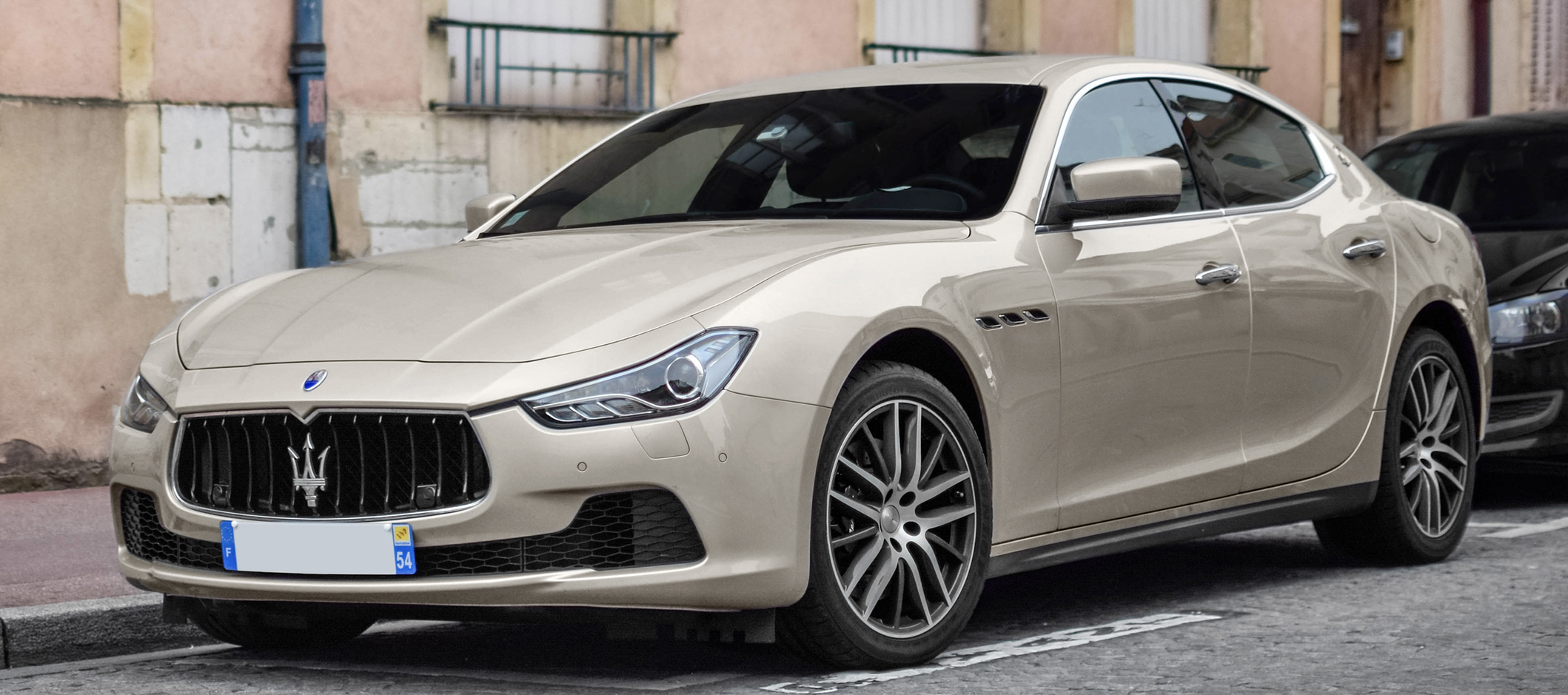

Overview
- Manufacturer: Maserati
- Production: 2013 – December 2023
- Model years: 2014–2024
- Assembly: Italy: Grugliasco, Turin (2013–2022); Turin (Stabilimento Mirafiori: 2022–2023)
- Designer: Centro Stile Maserati under Marco Tencone

Body and chassis
- Class: Executive car (E)
- Body style: 4-door saloon
- Layout: Front-engine, rear-wheel-drive /four-wheel-drive
- Platform: Maserati M157 platform
- Related: Maserati Quattroporte VI; Maserati Levante

Powertrain
- Engine: petrol: 3.0 L F160 twin-turbo V6; 3.8 L F154 twin-turbo V8; MHEV: 2.0 L GME T4 Multiair eTorque turbo I4; diesel: 3.0 L VM A630 HP turbo V6
- Electric motor: eBooster 48V (eTorque)
- Transmission: 8-speed ZF 8HP70 automatic
- Hybrid drivetrain: eTorque mild-hybrid system (eTorque)

Dimensions
- Wheelbase: 2,998 mm (118.0 in)
- Length: 4,971 mm (195.7 in)
- Width: 1,945 mm (76.6 in)
- Height: 1,461 mm (57.5 in)
- Kerb weight: 1,810–1,875 kg (3,990.4–4,133.7 lb)

The Maserati Ghibli (Tipo M157) is an executive car produced by Italian automobile manufacturer Maserati. The car was unveiled to the public at the 2013 Shanghai Motor Show. The Ghibli ended production at the end of 2023.

== Overview ==
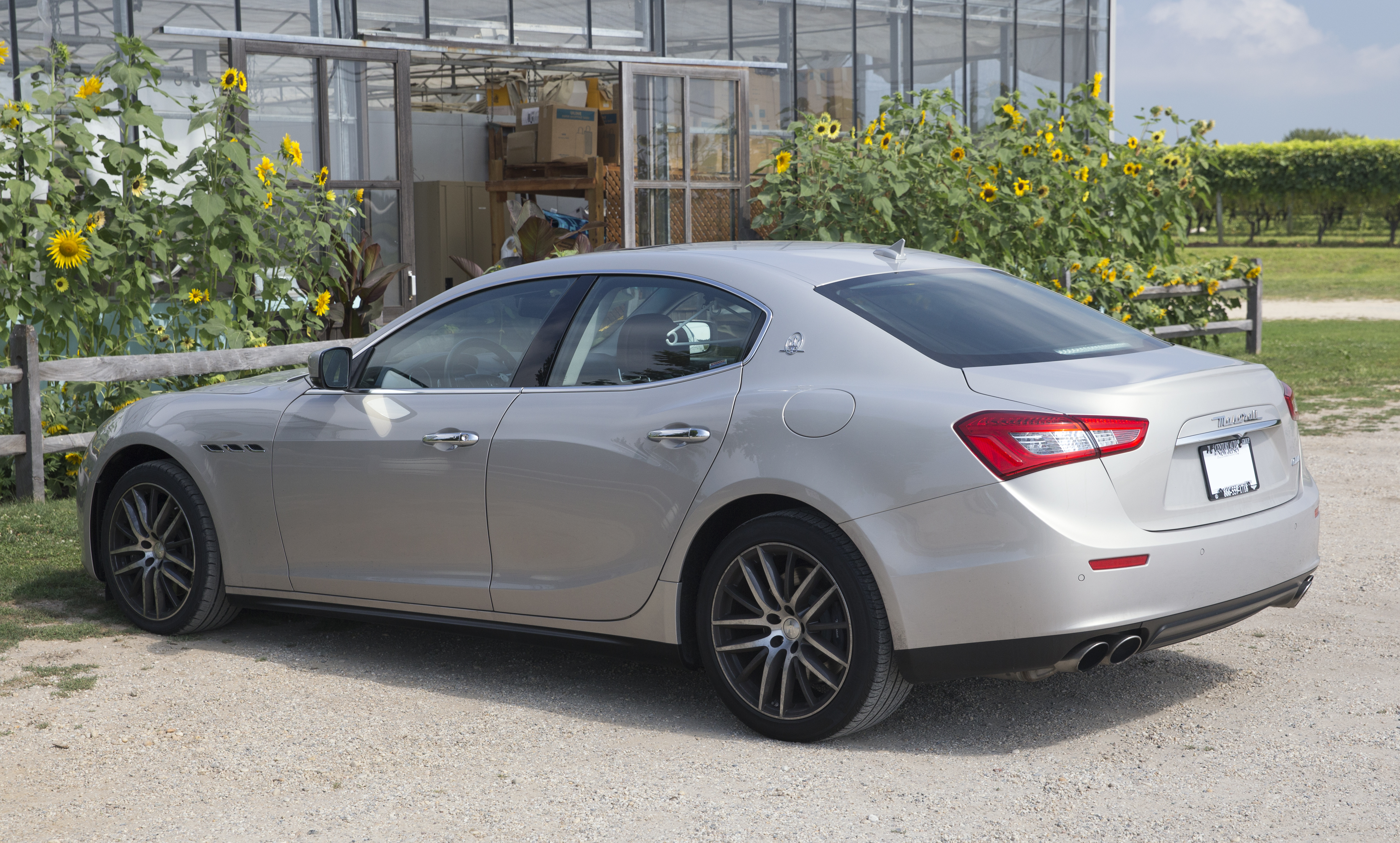
Ghibli S Q4

The Ghibli marks Maserati's comeback in the mid-size luxury car segment after two decades of absence, since the last of the Biturbo family saloons went out of production in 1994; it served as a key model in Maserati's plan of expanding its lineup to cover all segments in the luxury car market. Assembly of the Ghibli took place alongside that of the Quattroporte VI at the new Giovanni Agnelli Plant in Grugliasco near Turin, Italy. On September 24, 2019, the 100,000th Ghibli rolled off the production line as announced by Maserati.

== Variants ==
=== Ghibli ===
The Ghibli was introduced at the 2013 Shanghai Auto Show and marked Maserati's entry into the mid-size executive car market as being positioned below the Quattroporte. The Ghibli is the first car to be underpinned by the Maserati M156 platform and was the company's best seller until the Levante crossover SUV was launched. The company sold 6,000 units of the car in its first year into the market, which alone exceeded the best sales figures for Maserati for 2008, which was 9,000 cars sold in total consisting of different models. The number increased to 22,500 in 2013 and 36,448 in 2014. It continued to increase in 2015 due to the delay in the Levante's launch. The Ghibli also marks the return of the name in the US market as the Biturbo based Ghibli (AM336) was not available for sale there.

The Ghibli, which is based on a shorter wheelbase than the flagship Quattroporte, uses a steel monocoque chassis with additional subframes with the front subframe made of aluminium. Tested weight distribution for the diesel version stands at 51/49 front/rear.

The diesel engine in the Ghibli, developed under Ferrari engine specialist Paulo Martinelli, is based on the V6 diesel unit found in the Jeep Grand Cherokee. The engine is exclusive to the European market only. A ZF 8HP transmission powers the rear wheels as used by all the major competition except Mercedes-Benz.

Both the Ghibli and the Quattroporte share the same suspension although the Skyhook suspension is optional on the former. An optional Koni adaptive sport suspension is also available. From the 2018 model year, the Ghibli can be optioned with one of two new trims, namely GranSport and GranLusso, all of which relate to the interior of the car with the GranSport trim featuring an aggressive front bumper.

The Ghibli uses a customized version of the Uconnect infotainment system found in other FCA vehicles like the Dodge Charger. Buyers have different leather upholstery for the interior to choose from. An Alcantara headliner, a premium Harman Kardon or Bowers and Wilkins sound system, wood, carbon fiber and optional metal and weaved leather interior inserts and steering wheel are available as an option.

Safety features and amenities include adaptive cruise control, adaptive LED headlights supplied by Magnetti Marelli, lane keep assist, steering assist and brake force assist. The car received a five-star crash test rating from NCAP due to these features.

=== Ghibli S ===
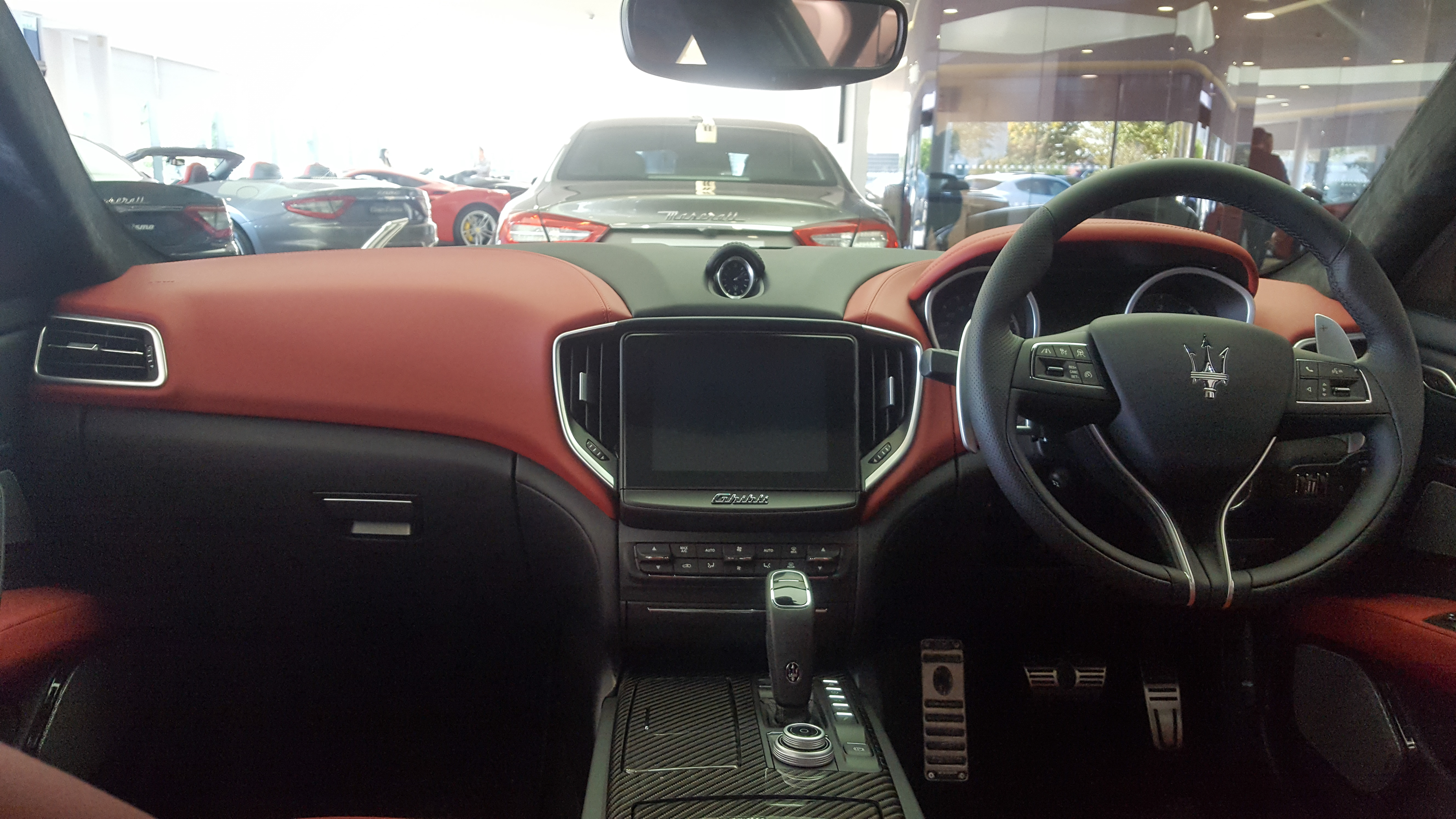
2018 Ghibli interior

The S is a high-performance variant of the Ghibli boasting power output and performance improvements. It was initially powered by a 410 PS (404 hp; 302 kW) version of the twin-turbocharged V6 engine used in the Ghibli but was uprated at 430 PS (424 hp; 316 kW) in 2017. Despite the similarities to the Alfa Romeo V6 engine, which is also manufactured by Ferrari, the engines are not related to each other since the Maserati engine is a 60-degree V6 (using a block cast by Chrysler) rather than Alfa Romeo's 90-degree unit. The same unit is also used by the high-performance version of the Levante SUV as well as the base trims of the Quattroporte.

The Ghibli S was initially equipped with a hydraulic power steering which was changed to an electric power steering when the Ghibli range was updated for the 2018 model year. It also benefits from the same safety features as the base Ghibli.

=== Ghibli Neiman Marcus ===
In occasion of Maserati's centenary, the limited-edition Maserati 100th Anniversary Neiman Marcus Ghibli S Q4 was the luxury car included in the 2014 edition of the Neiman Marcus Christmas Book gift catalogue. It is distinguished by Grigio Maratea paint over a Cuoio tan leather interior, forged multi-spoke wheels and black grille surround. The allotment was limited to 100 units, each priced at US$95,000.

=== 2020 Facelift ===
A facelifted Maserati Ghibli and new, hybrid version were unveiled online on 16 July 2020. In a world first, the hybrid version of the Ghibli features a 2.0L turbocharged four-cylinder petrol engine with a 48 volt "e-Booster" electric supercharger and supported by a battery.

The battery is mounted at the rear of the car, which Maserati claims benefits the weight distribution. The hybrid version weighs around 80 kg (176 lb) less than the Diesel version. The car has a maximum output of 330 PS (325 hp; 243 kW) and 450 N⋅m (332 lb⋅ft) of torque delivered from 1,500 rpm. The car has a top speed of 255 km/h (158.45 mph) and acceleration from 0 to 100 km/h (62.14 mph) in 5.7 seconds.

=== Trofeo ===
The Ghibli Trofeo is a high-performance version of the Ghibli powered by a 3.8 L twin turbocharged F154 V8 producing 580 PS (572 hp; 427 kW) at 6,250 rpm and of 730 N⋅m (538 lbf⋅ft) of torque. The engine is built at the Ferrari plant at Maranello to Maserati's specifications. Although new for the Ghibli, the V8 engine has already been used in the past on the Quattroporte GTS. The Trofeo can accelerate from 0-60 mph (97 km/h) in 4 seconds, with a top speed of 326 km/h (203 mph).

=== 334 Ultima ===
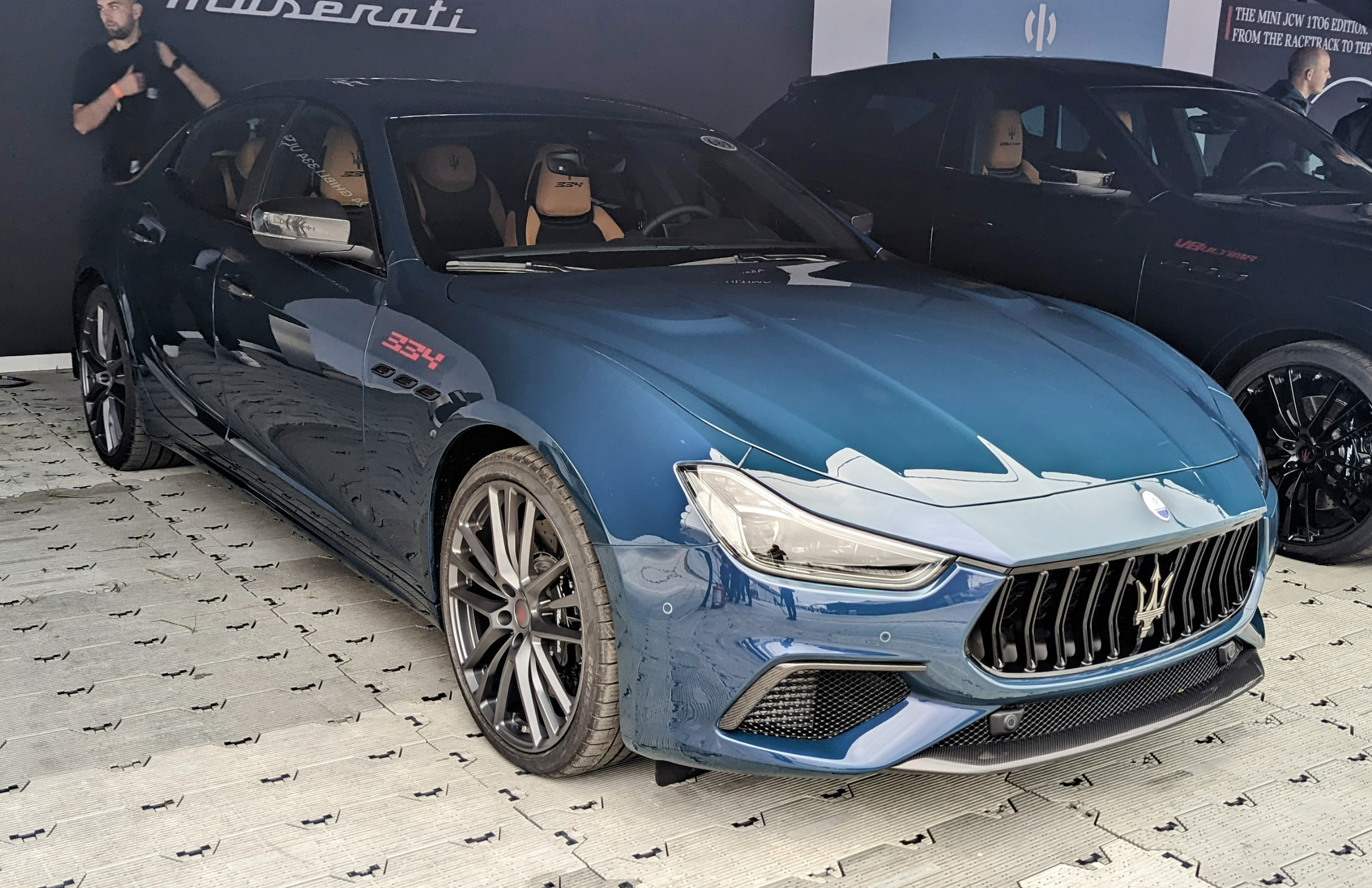
334 Ultima (UK)

To mark the end of production of the twin-turbo V8 engine, Maserati developed two special editions of the Ghibli and the Levante debuting at the 2023 Goodwood Festival of Speed: the Ghibli 334 Ultima and the Levante V8 Ultima. "334" denotes the car's top speed in kilometres per hour (208 mph) – which made it the fastest internal combustion-engined four-door sedan in the world at the time. The models were aimed to become collector's items as only 103 units were manufactured, a nod to the Maserati 5000 GT's internal model code, it having been Maserati's first V8-powered road car.

== Specifications ==
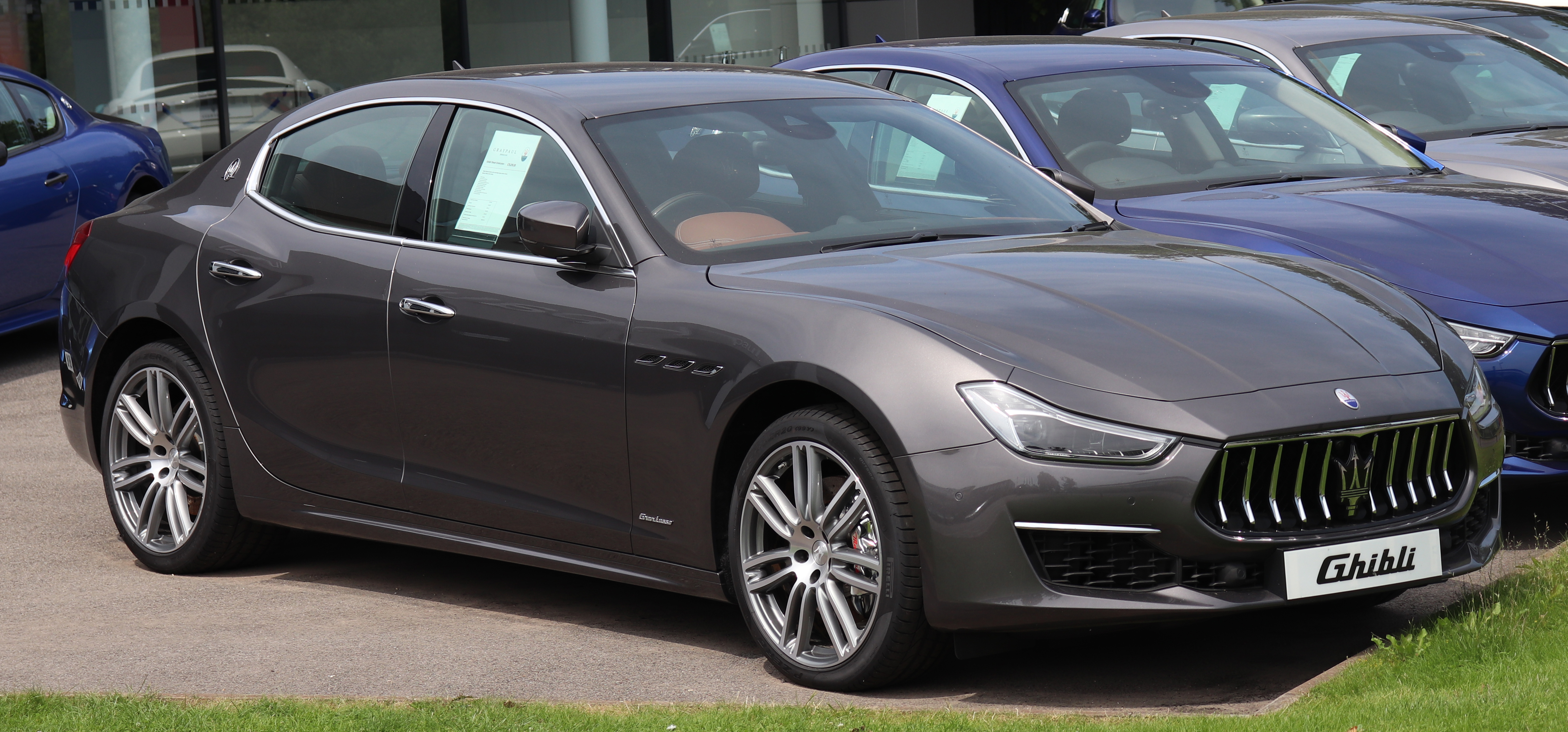

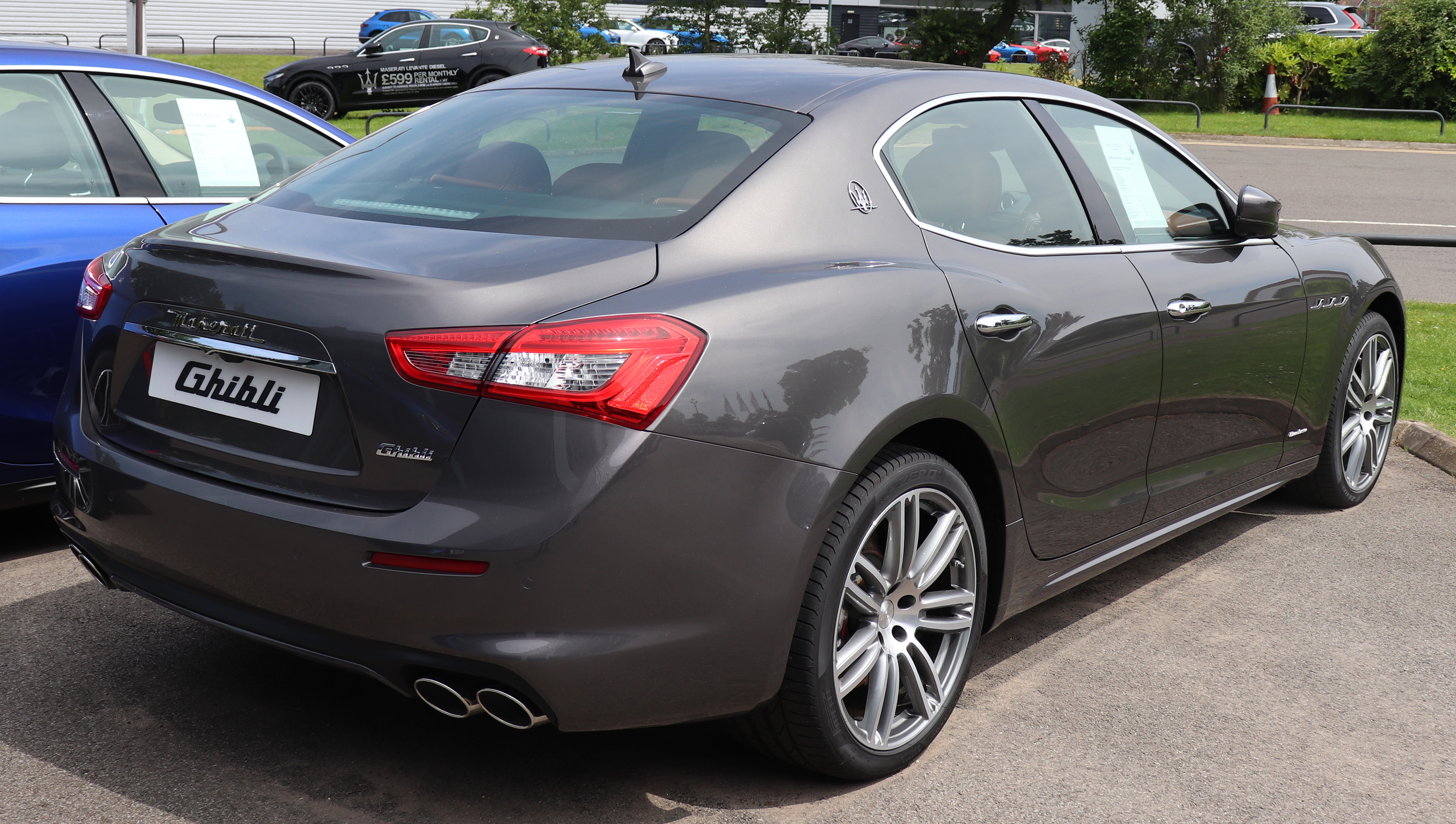
Maserati Ghibli with the GranLusso trim (post 2018 update)

The Maserati Ghibli shared the architecture of the sixth-generation of the Maserati Quattroporte, but sits on a 200 mm (7.9 in) shorter wheelbase for a 290 mm (11.4 in) shorter overall length. Suspension is a double wishbone unit at the front axle and 5-link multilink unit at the rear axle; Maserati's Skyhook adaptive damping system is optional. All Ghibli models employ a ZF 8-speed 8HP automatic transmission and a rear limited-slip differential. The braking system uses vented discs on all four corners, four-piston calipers at the front and floating calipers at the rear; the S models come with larger cross-drilled dual-cast rotors, six-piston calipers at the front and four-piston calipers at the rear.

Ghibli's original exterior design produced a drag coefficient of Cd=0.31, value later bested by the 2020 restyled model at Cd=0.29.

=== Engines ===
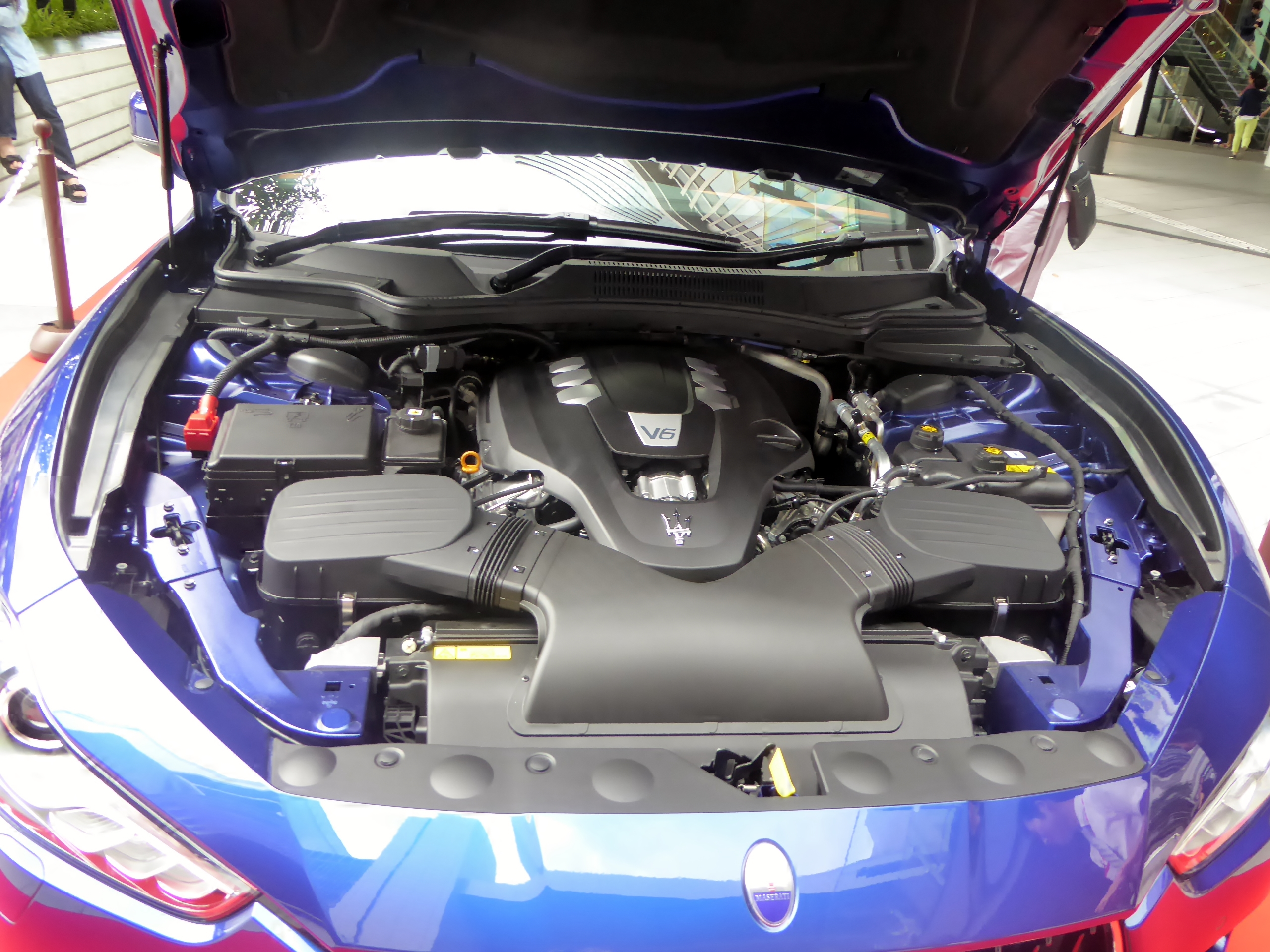
Engine bay of a Ghibli

From launch, the Ghibli is available with a choice of two petrol and one diesel engines: a 3.0-litre 330 PS (243 kW; 325 hp) twin-turbocharged V6 in the base Ghibli models, a 410 PS (302 kW; 404 hp) twin-turbocharged V6 in the high performance Ghibli S or Ghibli S Q4 (all wheel drive version, which is only available with this engine), or a 275 PS (202 kW; 271 hp), 3.0-litre V6 turbo-diesel in the Ghibli Diesel.

The petrol engine is a 2,979 cc (182 cu in) 60-degree V6. It utilizes a turbocharger per cylinder bank, twin intercoolers and direct injection. The engine is designed and assembled by Ferrari. In 2017 the Ghibli S and S Q4 were upgraded to 430 PS (316 kW; 424 hp) and 580 N⋅m (428 lb⋅ft) of torque.

The Ghibli is the first Maserati in history to be offered with a diesel engine. The unit is a 2,987 cc (182 cu in), common rail, single variable-geometry turbocharged A630 V6 designed and produced by Fiat Powertrain's subsidiary VM Motori. On the Italian market, only a slightly detuned diesel version is also available (at the same price) because of the higher taxation on cars with more than 250 PS (184 kW; 247 hp).

In early September 2023, Maserati announced that production of the V8-engined Ghibli models (as well as the Quattroporte) will conclude at the end of 2023. The Ferrari-built V6 may be replaced with Maserati's own Nettuno V6 engine.

Model	Fuel	Engine	Max power	Torque	Drive	Top speed	0–100 km/h 0–62 mph (seconds)	Emissions CO_{2}	Years
Ghibli Hybrid	Petrol	1,995 cc (122 cu in) turbocharged GME T4 I4 "eBooster 48V" MHEV	330 PS (243 kW; 325 hp) at 5,750 rpm	450 N⋅m (332 lb⋅ft) between 4,000 rpm	RWD	255 km/h (158 mph)	5.7	192 g/km	2021–2023
Ghibli	Petrol	2,979 cc (182 cu in) twin-turbocharged F160 V6	330 PS (243 kW; 325 hp) at 5,000 rpm	500 N⋅m (369 lb⋅ft) between 1,750–4,500 rpm	RWD	263 km/h (163 mph)	5.6	223* -207 g/km	2013–2015
Ghibli	Petrol	2,979 cc (182 cu in) twin-turbocharged F160 V6	350 PS (257 kW; 345 hp) at 5,000 rpm	500 N⋅m (369 lb⋅ft) between 1,750–4,500 rpm	RWD	267 km/h (166 mph)	5.5	255 - 257 g/km	2016–2023
Ghibli S	Petrol	2,979 cc (182 cu in) twin-turbocharged F160 V6	410 PS (302 kW; 404 hp) at 5,500 rpm	550 N⋅m (406 lb⋅ft) between 1,750–5,000 rpm	RWD	285 km/h (177 mph)	5	243 g/km	2013–2016
Ghibli S	Petrol	2,979 cc (182 cu in) twin-turbocharged F160 V6	430 PS (316 kW; 424 hp) at 5,750 rpm	580 N⋅m (428 lb⋅ft) between 2,250–4,000 rpm	RWD	286 km/h (178 mph)	4.9	223 g/km	2017–2023
Ghibli S Q4	Petrol	2,979 cc (182 cu in) twin-turbocharged F160 V6	410 PS (302 kW; 404 hp) at 5,500 rpm	550 N⋅m (406 lb⋅ft) between 1,750–5,000 rpm	AWD	284 km/h (176 mph)	4.8	246 g/km	2013–2016
Ghibli S Q4	Petrol	2,979 cc (182 cu in) twin-turbocharged F160 V6	430 PS (316 kW; 424 hp) at 5,750 rpm	580 N⋅m (428 lb⋅ft) between 2,250–4,000 rpm	AWD	286 km/h (178 mph)	4.7	275 - 278 g/km	2017–2023
Ghibli Trofeo	Petrol	3,798 cc (232 cu in) twin-turbocharged F154 V8	580 PS (427 kW; 572 hp) between 6,500–6,800 rpm	729 N⋅m (538 lb⋅ft) between 2,000–4,000 rpm	RWD	326 km/h (203 mph)	4.3	275 - 278 g/km	2020–2023
Ghibli 334 Ultima	Petrol	3,798 cc (232 cu in) twin-turbocharged F154 V8	580 PS (427 kW; 572 hp) between 6,500–6,800 rpm	729 N⋅m (538 lb⋅ft) between 2,000–4,000 rpm	RWD	334 km/h (208 mph)	3.9		2023
Ghibli Diesel**	Diesel	2,987 cc (182 cu in) turbocharged A630 HP V6	250 PS (184 kW; 247 hp) at 4,000 rpm	570 N⋅m (420 lb⋅ft) between 2,000–2,600 rpm	RWD	240 km/h (149 mph)	6.7	184 g/km	2013–2023
Ghibli Diesel	Diesel	2,987 cc (182 cu in) turbocharged A630 HP V6	275 PS (202 kW; 271 hp) at 4,000 rpm	570 N⋅m (420 lb⋅ft) between 2,000–2,600 rpm	RWD	250 km/h (155 mph)	6.3	184 g/km	2013–2015
Ghibli Diesel	Diesel	2,987 cc (182 cu in) turbocharged A630 HP V6	275 PS (202 kW; 271 hp) at 4,000 rpm	600 N⋅m (443 lb⋅ft) between 2,000–2,600 rpm	RWD	250 km/h (155 mph)	6.3	184 - 198 g/km	2016–2023
* Euro 5, ** Italian market only

=== Q4 all-wheel drive system ===
The high performance S version of the Ghibli is also available with all-wheel drive; this powertrain is the same as that in the Quattroporte VI (Q4). Attached to the end of the 8-speed transmission is a transfer case, containing an electronically controlled multi-plate wet clutch, which sends power through a drive shaft to an open differential bolted to the oil pan. During normal operation the car is rear-wheel drive only; when needed the system can divert up of 50% of engine power to the front wheels. The system adds 59 kg (130 lb) to the weight of the car, with no change in gas mileage or weight distribution. All-wheel-drive Maserati vehicles make up 70 percent of the company's sedan sales in the United States.

== Concept cars ==
=== Ghibli Zegna Edition Concept ===
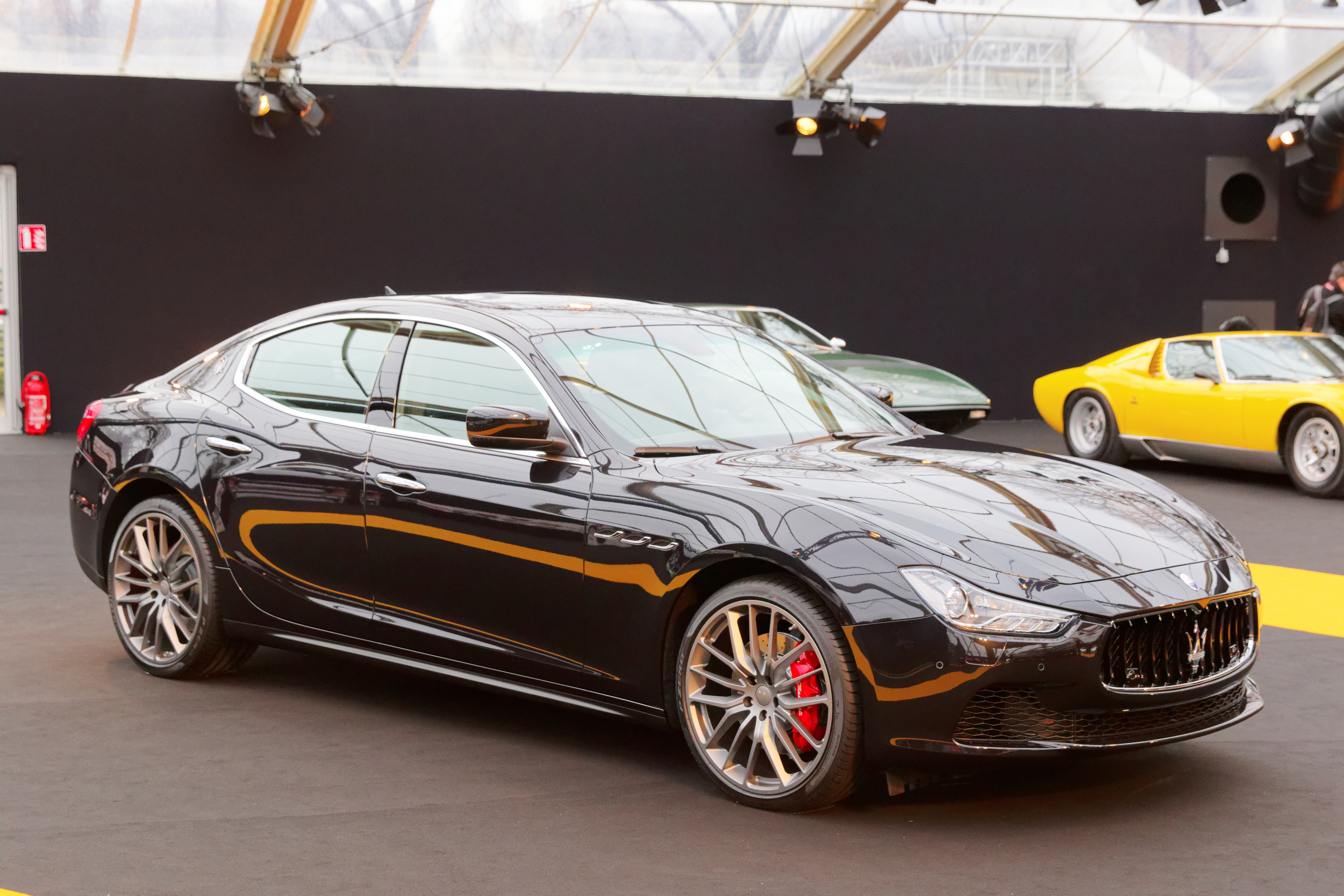
Ghibli Zegna Edition

At the 2014 Paris Motor Show Maserati unveiled the Ghibli Zegna Edition Concept, a concept car previewing the marque's second collaboration with Italian fashion house Ermenegildo Zegna after the Quattroporte Zegna limited edition. The cabin is upholstered in Poltrona Frau leather and anthracite Zegna silk fabric; the exterior features triple-layer "Azzurro Astro" paint and special "Liquid Silver" 20 inch wheels. The concept car is based on a Ghibli S Q4.

== Sales ==
Year	Europe	United States
2013	339	-
2014	4,238	-
2015	4,644	7,925
2016	4,124	7,100
2017	2,981	5,563
2018	2,534	4,644
2019	1,723	-
Total	20,583	25,232

== Safety ==
Euro NCAP test results* Maserati Ghibli (2013)
Test	Points	%
Overall:	5 /5 stars	
Adult occupant:	34	95%
Child occupant:	39	79%
Pedestrian:	27	74%
Safety assist:	7	81%

ANCAP test results* Maserati Ghibli (2014)
Test	Score
Overall	5 /5 stars
Frontal offset	15.47/16
Side impact	16/16
Pole	2/2
Seat belt reminders	3/3
Whiplash protection	Good
Pedestrian protection	Adequate
Electronic stability control	Standard

The Maserati Ghibli passed the Euro NCAP car safety tests in 2013, receiving a five-star rating.

In 2013 the US-specification 2014 Maserati Ghibli was tested by the Insurance Institute for Highway Safety, receiving "Good" rating in all four tests (moderate overlap front impact, side impact, roof strength, head restraints and seats); it therefore qualified for the 2013 Top Safety Pick.

In 2021, the Trofeo includes features such as: Full-speed adaptive cruise control, traffic-sign recognition, blind-spot monitoring, lane-keeping assist, automatic emergency braking.

== Marketing ==
In the United States, the Ghibli was used in a commercial during Super Bowl XLVIII called "Strike", which aired on 2 February 2014. This marked the first time that Maserati aired an ad in the United States, which is part of Fiat Chrysler's promotional push to expand its brands in North America, as it prepared to sell the Ghibli there in the first quarter of 2014.

The Ghibli appears in the 2015 film Furious 7 and was driven by Deckard Shaw (Jason Statham).
