= Fiat Mirafiori =

Fiat headquarters in Italy

Stabilimento di Mirafiori
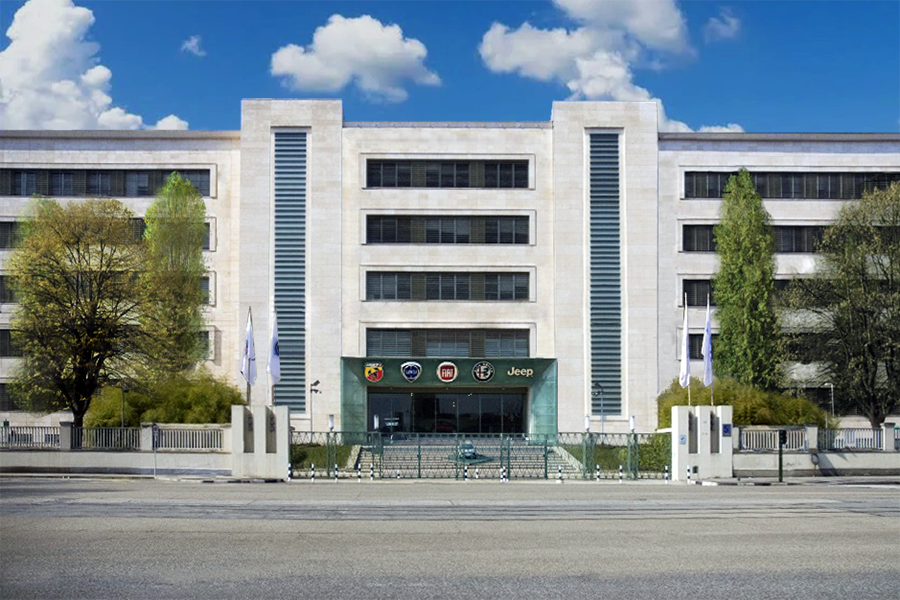
- Built: 1939
- Location: Corso Giovanni Agnelli n.200; Turin, Italy; Turin, Italy
- Coordinates: 45.027106°N 7.636399°E
- Industry: Automotive
- Products: Maserati GranTurismo
- Employees: 18,000 (2012)
- Area: 2,000,000 m^{2} (22,000,000 sq ft)

The Stabilimento di Mirafiori (in English: Mirafiori Factory) is the headquarters and industrial district of the Italian automobile manufacturer Fiat, a subsidiary of FCA Italy, which is part of Stellantis, and is the headquarters of CNH Industrial Group. The name Mirafiori derives from the homonymous district in which it is located (in turn derived from the name of an ancient castle of the Savoy).

In the past, it was the largest Italian industrial complex. It is the oldest automobile factory in Europe and is still partially in operation today. It occupies an area of 2,000,000 m². Twenty kilometres of railway lines and 11 kilometres of underground roads link the various warehouses. The office building, which overlooks Corso Giovanni Agnelli, is a 5-storey building 220 metres long, covered with white Finale stone. The self-contained electricity production of the plant was around 210 GWh/year in 2011. Today around 18,000 employees work in the area and in 2012 about 41,600 cars were produced. Currently it produces the Fiat 500e, Maserati Levante luxury SUV, Maserati Ghibli sport sedan and Maserati Quattroporte luxury sedan.

In the more than 80 years since inauguration, over 35 types of cars and 28.7 million vehicles have been produced at the Mirafiori plant.

== History ==
It was inaugurated on 15 May 1939 in the presence of Benito Mussolini, but the Duce found himself speaking in a cold climate of workers, marked by the increase in food prices due to the politics of autarky and the fear of the imminent war, which point to leave the stage when a question addressed to the crowd was answered only by a few hundred people out of the 50,000 present.

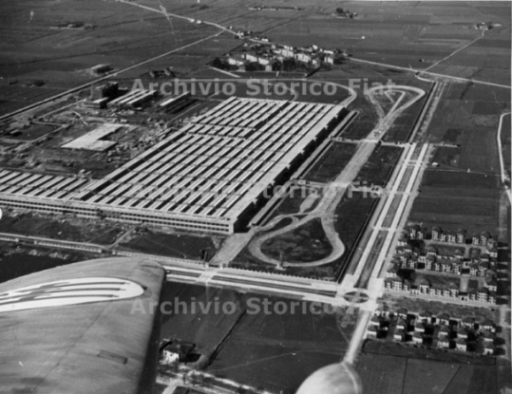
Mirafiori (1942)

The first model that would have been produced was the Fiat 700, a project left unfinished due to the outbreak of the Second World War. Car production really started only in 1947 with the second series of the Fiat 500 B “Topolino” and the relocation of the lines of the Fiat 1100, previously built at the Lingotto factory.

On 5 March 1943 a workers' strike began in workshop 19 of the factory. Within days some 100,000 workers had downed tools in what became the first major worker rebellion under the Fascist regime, soon spreading to factories across Northern Italy. Remembered as the strikes of March 1943, the movement contributed to the collapse of the regime and is regarded as an early episode of the anti-fascist resistance.

Seriously damaged by air raids during the Second World War, the factory was rebuilt and expanded with a development project that culminated with the doubling of capacity, completed in 1958. Starting from the post-war period, the design of the most advanced Fiat products (cars, industrial vehicles, aeronautical engines, aircraft, etc.) was concentrated in the office building and the plant became the site of the greatest industrial development in Turin (new welfare, and inevitably also of great social tensions).

In 1956 the expansion called "Mirafiori-Sud" was inaugurated, where the activities of sheet metal stamping and mechanical machining (engines and gearboxes) were located and expanded, while in the original area (now called Mirafiori-Nord) there remained the paving, the painting, the assembly, the finishing and the test track, as well as minor workings.

In 1969, in full economic expansion, great agitation due to the three-year term of the metalworkers' work contract gave rise to the Hot Autumn. The contractual claims joined the students' demands, giving life to a movement that would shake Italy for over a decade. Years later, Enrico Berlinguer, with a gesture of strong emblematic value, and not just within the PCI, would speak at the gates of Mirafiori, occupied by the workers: "That" top action "is realized with increasing separateness among the levels of the organization: the top managers of professional politicians, a consolidated class of local administrators, the grassroots militants, the last representatives of a communist people spread among work, trade unions, commitment in and for the party".

In the early 1970s the plant was upgraded to accommodate the production lines of a very important model for the Fiat range: the 131 sedan that, to honour the plant that reached the peak of production and technology in those years, was named the 131 Mirafiori which was not the first model to reintroduce a numerical alpha denomination, as there had already been the 124, 125, 126, 127, 128 and 130 models before it. The 131 was produced from 1974 to 1983 with 1,513,800 units sold.

In October 2001 production of the Lancia Thesis started after the closure of the Fiat Rivalta plant. In 2002 Fiat relocated the production of Lancia Lybra and Alfa Romeo 166. In 2003 Mirafiori plant started producing the Fiat Idea minivan and the sister Lancia Musa and in 2006 started the second assembly line of the Fiat Grande Punto. Production of the Grande Punto stopped in 2007 and the assembly line was converted to produce the Alfa Romeo Mito and many components for the Abarth Grande Punto.

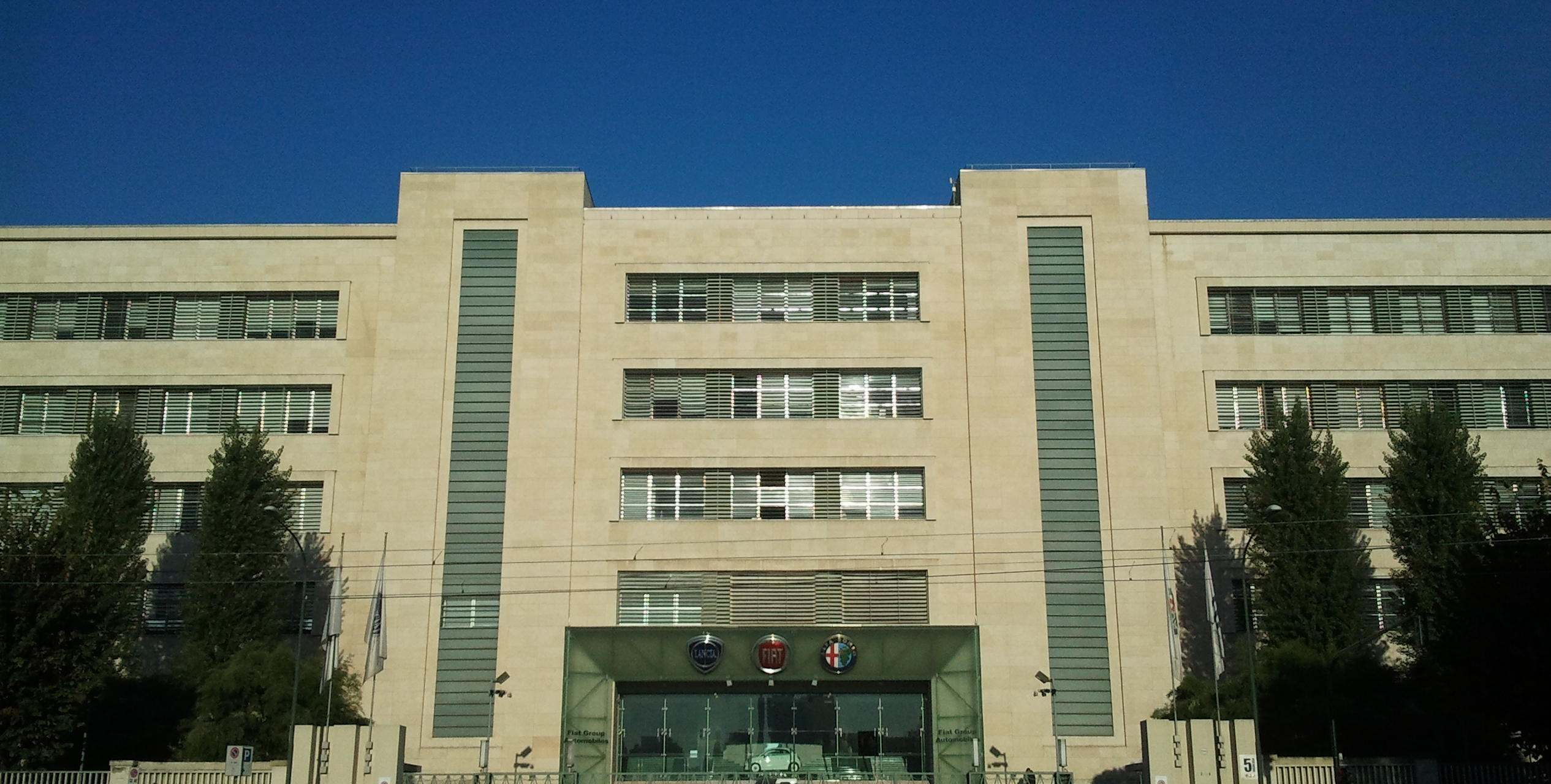
Mirafiori (2011)

On 18 February 2008 the new Abarth headquarters was inaugurated in the Officina 83 area, while the new Abarth 500 was also presented during the inauguration of the same.

In July 2012, production of Fiat Idea and Lancia Musa ceased.

In 2016, production started of the Maserati Levante luxury sport utility.

In summer 2018, the last Alfa Romeo Mito was built. In November 2018 FCA announced that the production of the Fiat 500 Electric was planned for 2020. In July 2019 FCA started investing 788 million euros into building electric Fiat 500e. As of 2022, the Fiat 500e and the Maserati Levante are produced in Mirafiori.

== Vehicle produced in Mirafiori ==
- Fiat 500 "Topolino" (1947–1955)
- Fiat 1100 (1947–1953)
- Fiat 1400 (1950)
- Fiat 1900 (1952)
- Fiat 1100/103 (1953–1970)
- Fiat 600 (1955–1969)
- Fiat 500 (1957–1972)
- Fiat 1200 (1957)
- Fiat 1800 (1959)
- Fiat 2100 (1959)
- Fiat 1300 (1961)
- Fiat 1500 (1961)
- Fiat 2300 (1961)
- Fiat 850 (1964)
- Fiat 124 (1966–1974)
- Fiat 125 (1967–1972)
- Fiat 127 (1971–1983)
- Fiat 131 (1974–1984)
- Fiat Panda (1980–2003)
- Fiat Uno (1983–1995)
- Fiat Croma (1985–1996)
- Lancia Thema (1984–1994)
- Autobianchi Y10 (1985–1995)
- Fiat Punto (176) (1993–1999)
- Fiat Marea (1996–2003)
- Fiat Multipla (1998–2010)
- Fiat Punto (188) (1999–2010)
- Lancia Lybra (2002–2005)
- Lancia Thesis (2002–2007)
- Alfa Romeo 166 (2002–2007)
- Fiat Idea (2003–2012)
- Lancia Musa (2004–2012)
- Fiat Grande Punto (2005–2006)
- Zastava 10 (2005)
- Alfa Romeo MiTo (2008–2018)
- Maserati Levante (2016–2024)
- Fiat New 500 (2020–present)
- Maserati Ghibli (2022–2023)
- Maserati Quattroporte (2022–2023)
- Maserati GranTurismo (2023–present)
