= Maserati Levante =

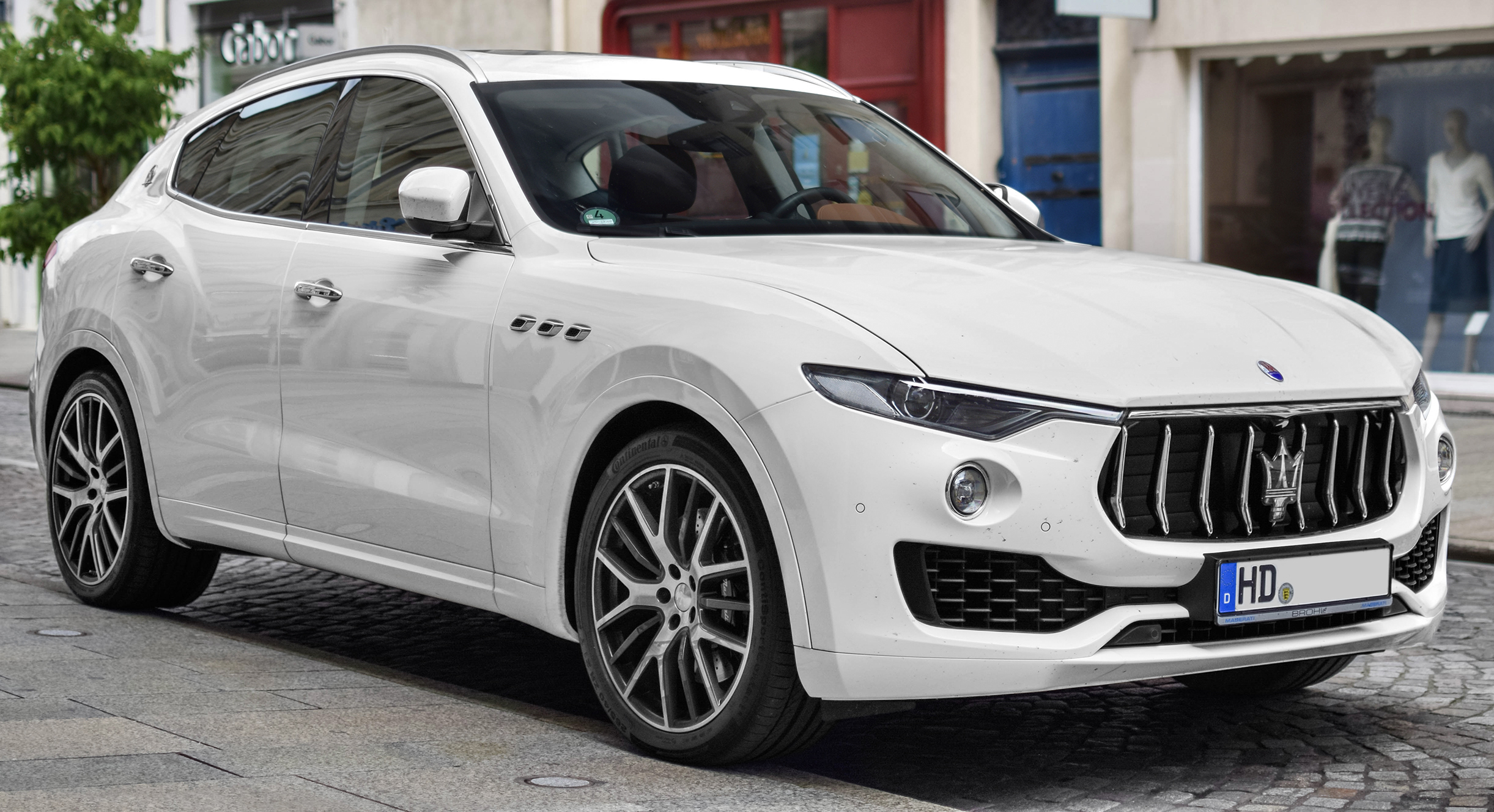
- 2016 Maserati Levante S (Europe, pre-facelift)

Overview
- Manufacturer: Maserati
- Production: March 2016–March 2024
- Model years: 2017–2024
- Assembly: Italy: Turin (Stabilimento Mirafiori)
- Designer: Centro Stile Maserati

Body and chassis
- Class: Mid-size luxury crossover SUV
- Body style: 5-door SUV
- Layout: F4 layout
- Platform: Chrysler LX platform
- Related: Maserati Ghibli (M157); Maserati Quattroporte VI

Powertrain
- Engine: Petrol; 3.0 L F160 twin-turbo V6; 3.8 L F154 twin-turbo V8; MHEV; 2.0 L GME T4 Multiair eTorque turbo I4; Diesel; 3.0 L VM A630 HP turbo V6
- Electric motor: eBooster 48V (eTorque)
- Transmission: 8-speed ZF 8HP automatic
- Hybrid drivetrain: eTorque mild-hybrid system (eTorque)

Dimensions
- Wheelbase: 3,004 mm (118.3 in)
- Length: 5,003 mm (197.0 in)
- Width: 1,968 mm (77.5 in)
- Height: 1,679 mm (66.1 in)
- Kerb weight: 2,109–2,205 kg (4,650–4,861 lb)

The Maserati Levante (Tipo M161) is an executive crossover SUV produced by Italian manufacturer Maserati at the Mirafiori factory in Turin from 2016. The Levante went on sale in Europe in May 2016, and in North America in September 2016. Production of the Levante ended in 2024, commemorated with the release of a top-spec 424BHP special edition.

The Levante was named after a warm, easterly wind that blows in the western Mediterranean Sea, southern France, down to the Strait of Gibraltar. The name of the wind, in turn, comes from the Latin word "levare", which means "to rise". Its design is based on the Kubang concept car that debuted at the 2011 Frankfurt Auto Show.

== Announcements ==
The concept that led to the Levante, the Maserati Kubang, was unveiled in 2011 at the Frankfurt Auto Show. The Levante was first unveiled at the Geneva Motor Show on 1 March 2016, followed by a 2016 New York Auto Show. Production began in March 2016. Models for the United States went on sale in April 2016. Early models included Levante (350 PS) and Levante S (430 PS).

Canada models went on sale in September 2016. Early models included Levante (350 PS) and Levante S (430 PS). The Maserati Levante Trofeo was unveiled at the 2018 New York International Auto Show. The Trofeo has 3.8 litre twin turbo V8 engine and Q4 all wheel drive, with 590 PS (434 kW; 582 hp) and 730 N⋅m (538 lbf⋅ft) peak torque.

Near the end of 2023, there was speculation that Maserati would be ending production of the Levante with the 2024 or 2025 model year. In early 2024, it was confirmed that 2024 would be the last model year for the Levante.

== Specifications ==
The Levante initially featured Ferrari's 3.0L V6 engine, in two states of tune. A diesel model is also offered, which served as the only engine offering for right hand drive markets from 2016 to the end of 2017, until the official announcement and deployment of gasoline RHD models in the middle of 2017, starting with the Levante S and subsequently the base Levante sometime in 2018. Levante has a drag coefficient of Cd=0.33.

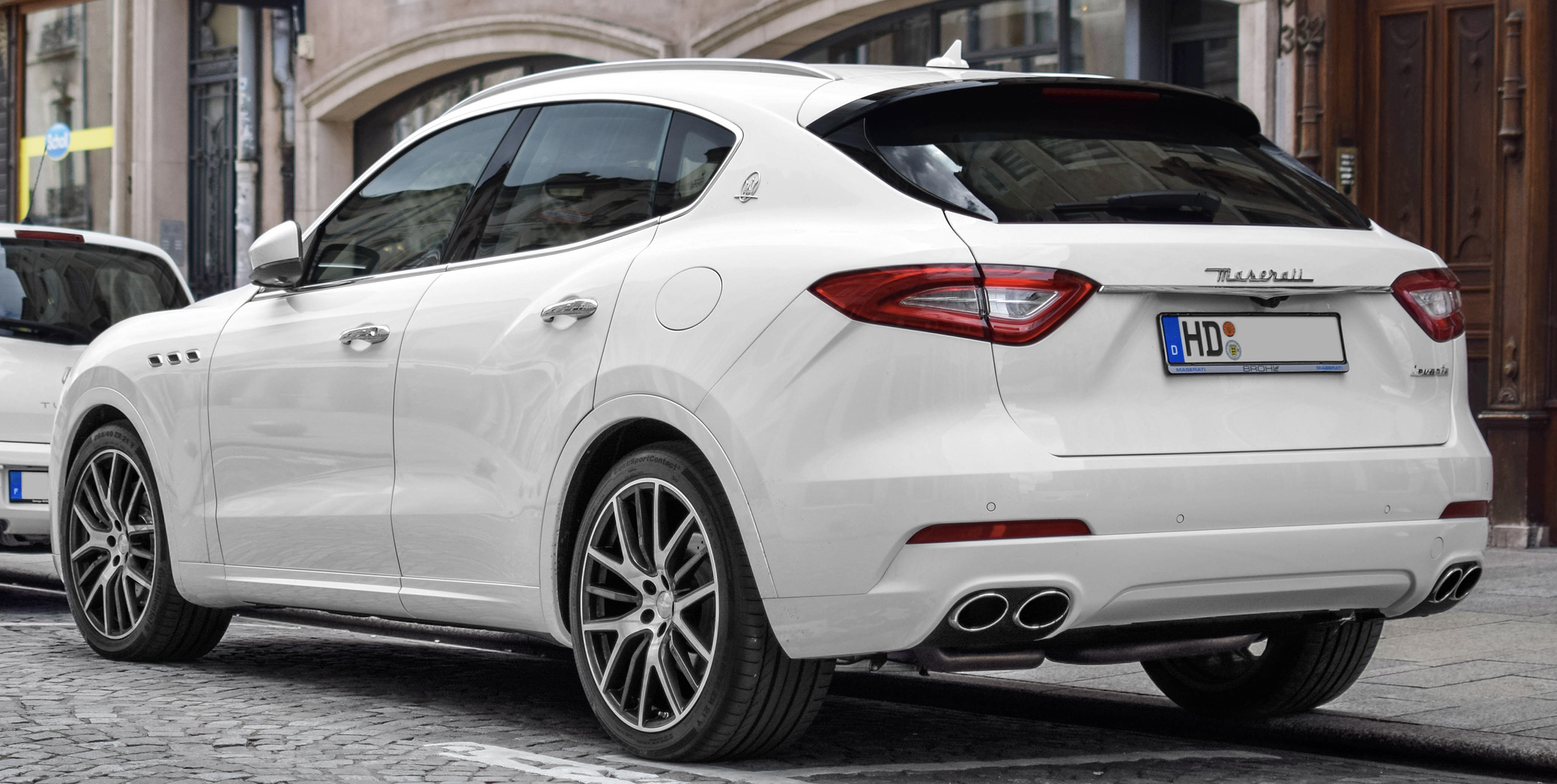
Rear view

By 2018, a 560 horsepower V8 was planned to be added. Subsequently, two V8 models were announced in 2018: the 590 horsepower Trofeo, followed by the 550 horsepower GTS. The Levante gains an eight speed ZF automatic transmission from the sixth generation Maserati Quattroporte.

The vehicle's drivetrain is four-wheel-drive only, and like other Maserati models (Quattroporte and Ghibli in both rear and all wheel drive), comes standard with a rear limited-slip differential. The Levante also features Maserati Touch Control with a full color 8.1-inch (210 mm) TFT touchscreen display, as well as a reconfigurable TFT gauge cluster with full color.

Model	Engine	Peak power	Peak torque	Drive	Top speed	0–100 km/h 0–62 mph	CO_{2} emissions
Petrol engines (North American market)
Levante GT	2,979 cc (182 cu in) twin-turbocharged F160 V6	350 PS (257 kW; 345 hp) at 5750 rpm	500 N⋅m (369 lb⋅ft) between 1750–4750 rpm	AWD	251 km/h (156 mph)	6.0 s	
Levante Modena	2,979 cc (182 cu in) twin-turbocharged F160 V6	430 PS (316 kW; 424 hp) at 5750 rpm	580 N⋅m (428 lb⋅ft) between 2000–4750 rpm	AWD	264 km/h (164 mph)	5.2 s	
Levante Modena S	3,799 cc (232 cu in) twin-turbocharged F154 V8	550 PS (405 kW; 542 hp) at 6250rpm	730 N⋅m (538 lb⋅ft) between 2500–5000 rpm	AWD	292 km/h (181 mph)	4.2 s	
Levante Trofeo	3,799 cc (232 cu in) twin-turbocharged F154 V8	598 PS (440 kW; 590 hp) at 6250rpm	730 N⋅m (538 lb⋅ft) between 2500–5000 rpm	AWD	304 km/h (189 mph)	3.9 s	
Petrol engines (European market)
Levante GT Hybrid	1,995 cc (122 cu in) turbocharged I4 "eBooster 48V" petrol MHEV	330 PS (243 kW; 325 hp) at 5,750 rpm	450 N⋅m (332 lb⋅ft) between 2250–4000 rpm	AWD	251 km/h (156 mph)	5.7 s	231–252g /km
Levante Modena	2,979 cc (182 cu in) twin-turbocharged F160 V6	350 PS (257 kW; 345 hp) at 5750 rpm	500 N⋅m (369 lb⋅ft) between 1750–4750 rpm	AWD	251 km/h (156 mph)	6.0 s	268–278 g/km
Levante Modena S	2,979 cc (182 cu in) twin-turbocharged F160 V6	430 PS (316 kW; 424 hp) at 5750 rpm	580 N⋅m (428 lb⋅ft) between 2000–4750 rpm	AWD	264 km/h (164 mph)	5.2 s	273–282 g/km
Levante GTS	3,799 cc (232 cu in) twin-turbocharged F154 V8	530 PS (390 kW; 523 hp) at 6250rpm	730 N⋅m (538 lb⋅ft) between 2500–5000 rpm	AWD	291 km/h (181 mph)	4.3 s	308–319 g/km
Levante Trofeo	3,799 cc (232 cu in) twin-turbocharged F154 V8	580 PS (427 kW; 572 hp) at 6750rpm	730 N⋅m (538 lb⋅ft) between 2500–5000 rpm	AWD	300 km/h (186 mph)	4.1 s	308–319 g/km
Diesel engines
Levante Diesel	2,987 cc (182 cu in) turbocharged A630 HP V6	275 PS (202 kW; 271 hp) at 4000 rpm	600 N⋅m (443 lb⋅ft) between 2000–2600 rpm	AWD	230 km/h (143 mph)	6.9 s	207–220 g/km

== Gallery ==
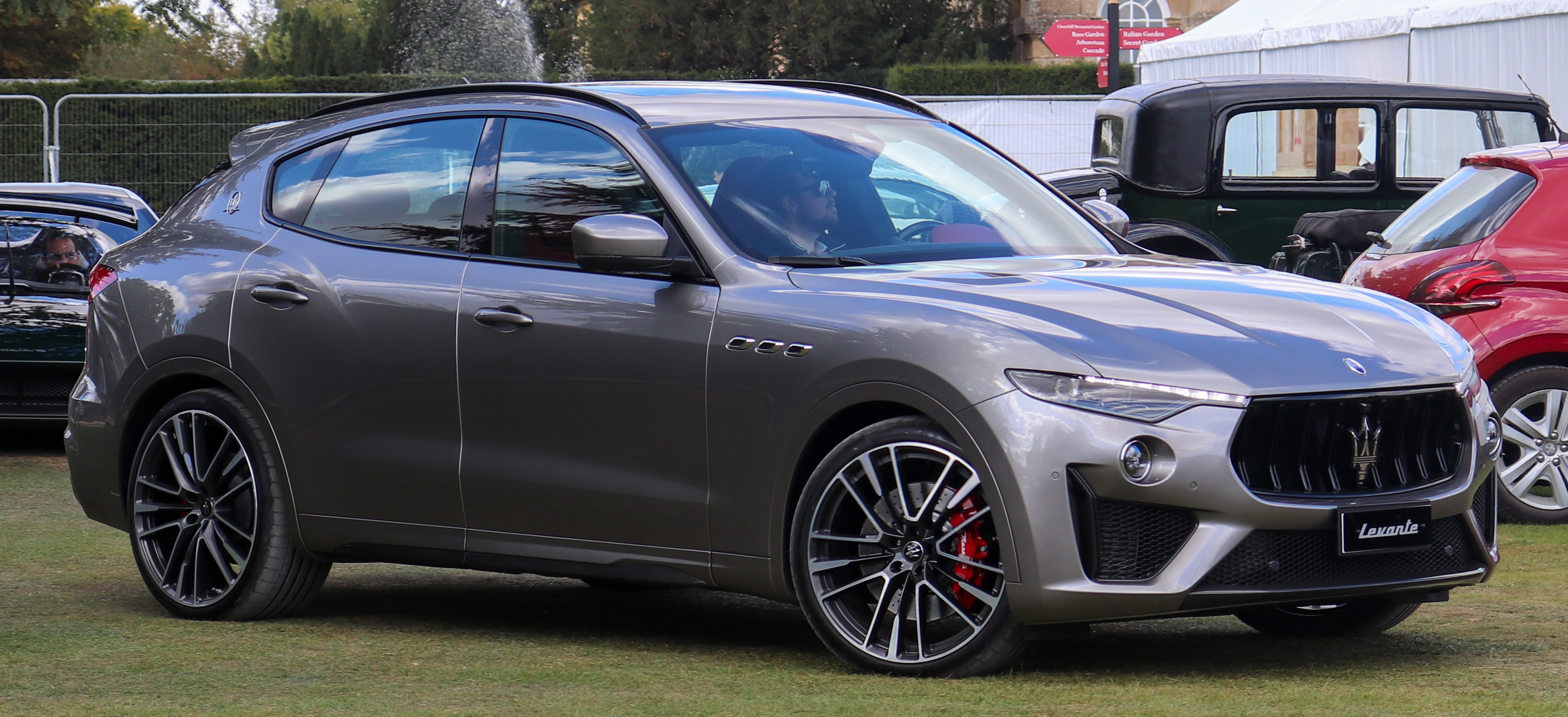
Levante Trofeo

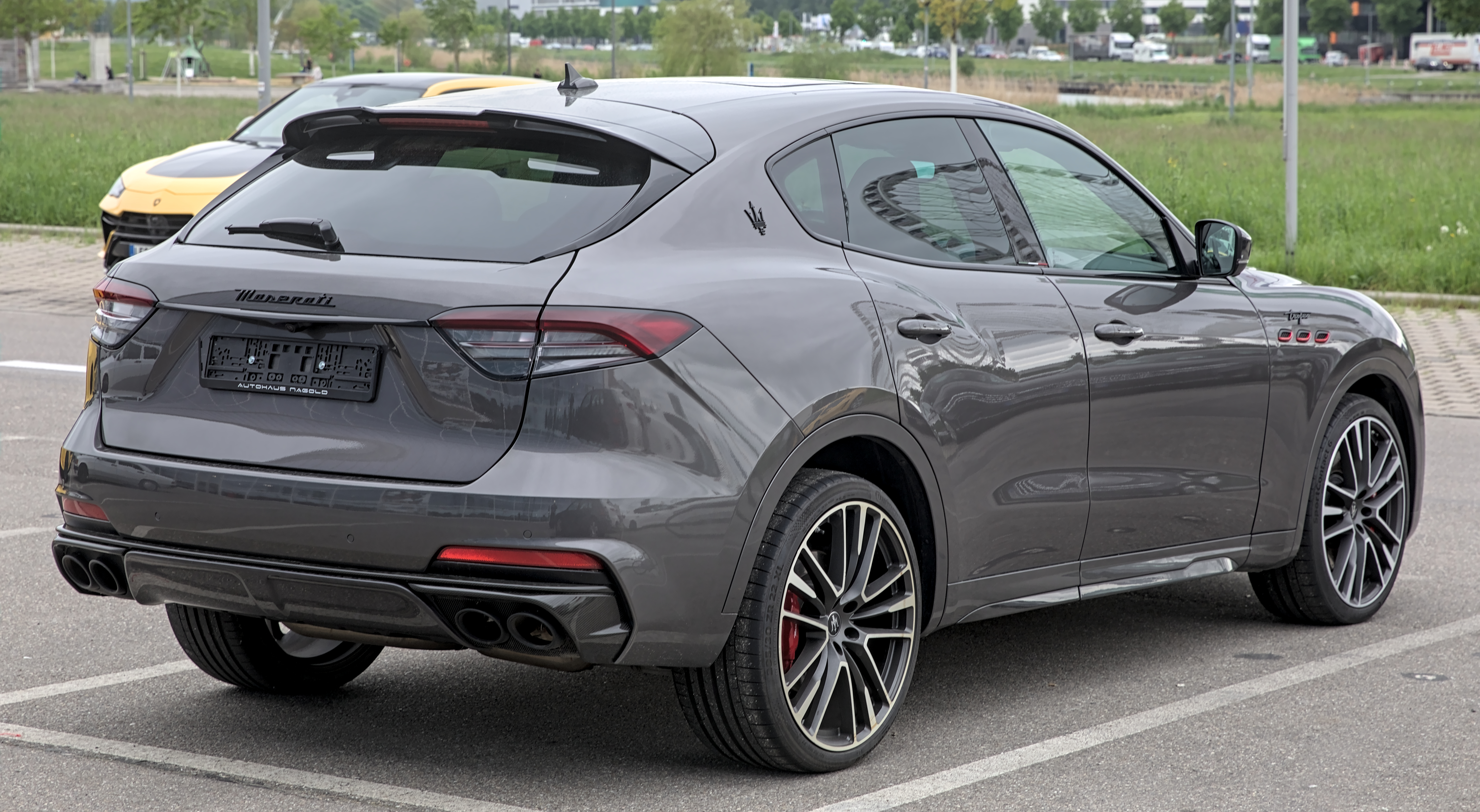
Rear view

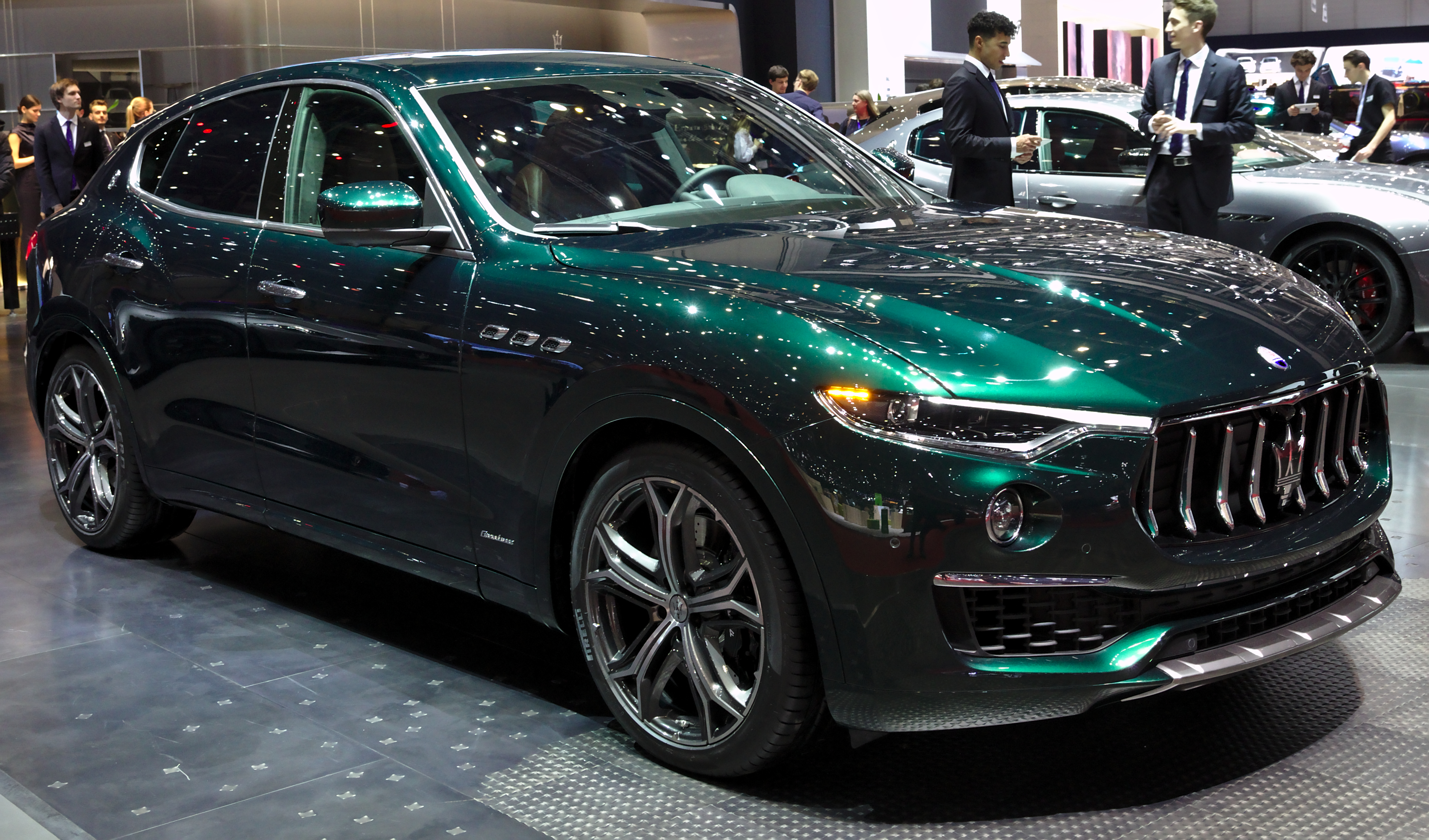
Levante Allegro Antinori One of One

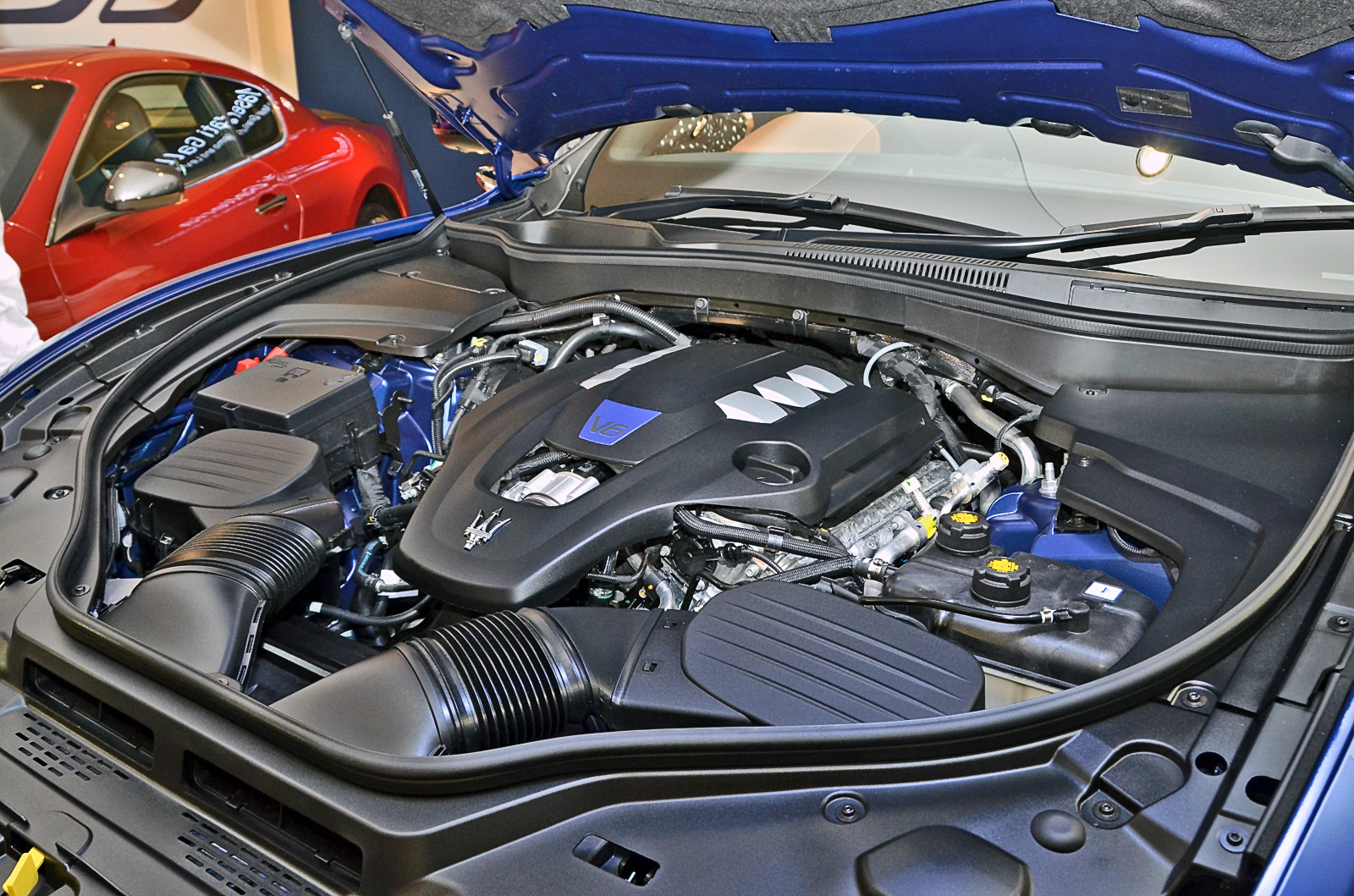
Engine

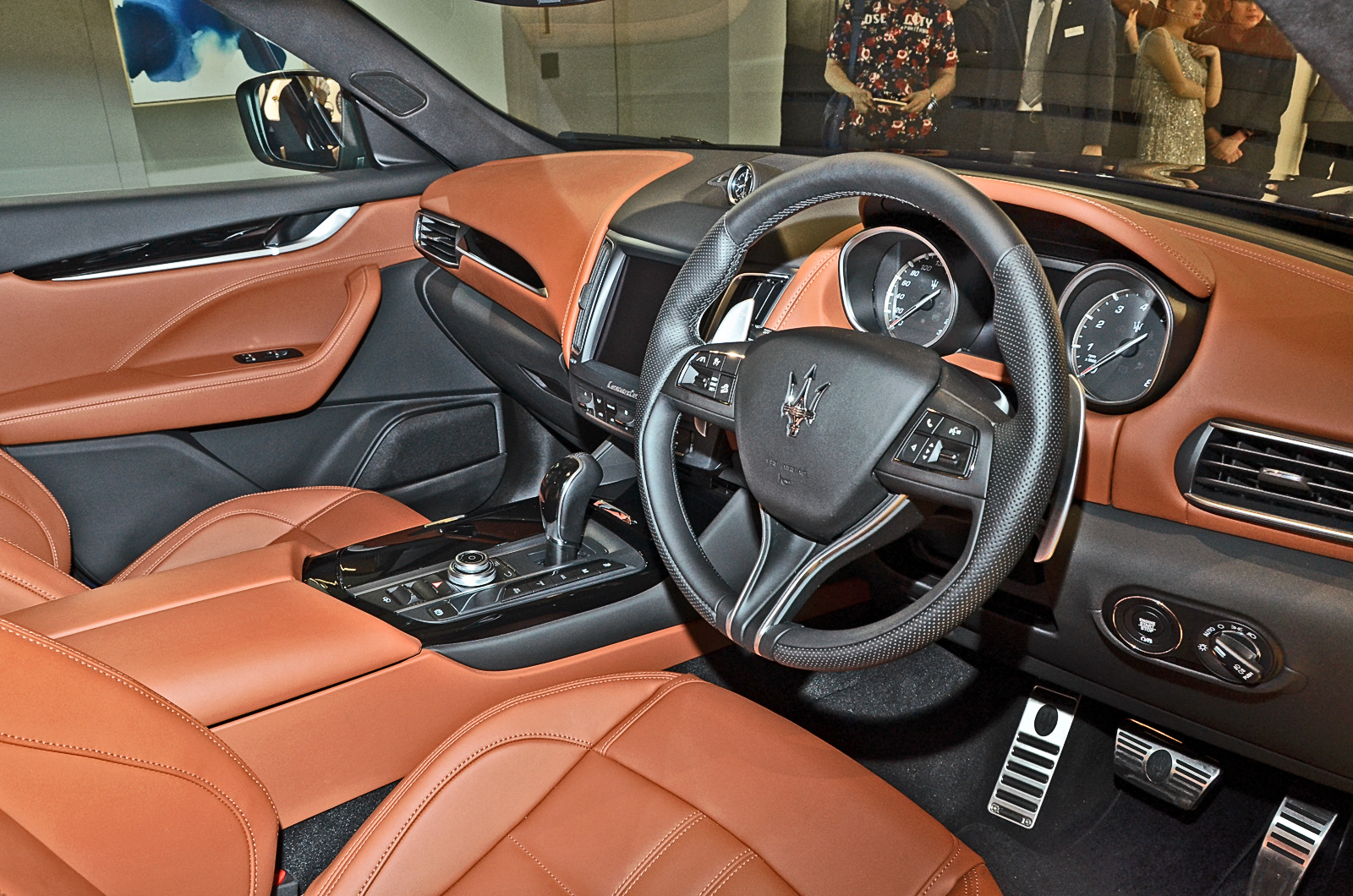
Interior
