= Ferrari F160 engine =

Overview
- Manufacturer: Ferrari
- Production: 2013-2024

Layout
- Configuration: 60° V6
- Displacement: 2,979 cc (181.8 cu in)
- Cylinder bore: 86.5 mm (3.41 in)
- Piston stroke: 84.5 mm (3.33 in)
- Cylinder block material: Aluminum
- Cylinder head material: Aluminum
- Valvetrain: DOHC, 24-valve
- Compression ratio: 9.7:1

Combustion
- Turbocharger: Two mono-scroll parallel turbochargers
- Fuel system: Gasoline direct injection
- Fuel type: Gasoline
- Cooling system: Water cooled

Output
- Power output: 330–430 PS (240–320 kW)
- Torque output: 500–580 N⋅m (370–430 lb⋅ft)

The F160 is a 60° V6 gasoline engine that displaces 2,979 cc (181.8 cu in). It utilizes a turbocharger for each cylinder bank, twin intercoolers and direct injection. The engine was designed by Maserati and assembled by Ferrari. The engine blocks were cast and machined to Ferrari's approved specifications respectively at Chrysler's Kokomo and Trenton Engine Plant in Indiana before being sent to Modena, Italy, for final assembly by Ferrari. This engine shares bore and combustion chamber design, the same valves control technology (i.e. roller finger followers and four cam phasers), the same twin turbocharging approach and direct injection-ignition system with Ferrari F154 engine. The engine auxiliaries are identical (alternator, starter motor and power steering pump) or very similar (variable displacement oil pump). The difference of F160 from F154: F160 engine block is made by a high pressure die cast (HPDC) process which is suitable for high volume production. However, it is open deck type and can't endure high specific power in HP/liter. F160 does not have an overboost function. Ferrari was responsible for design and bench testing of this engine.

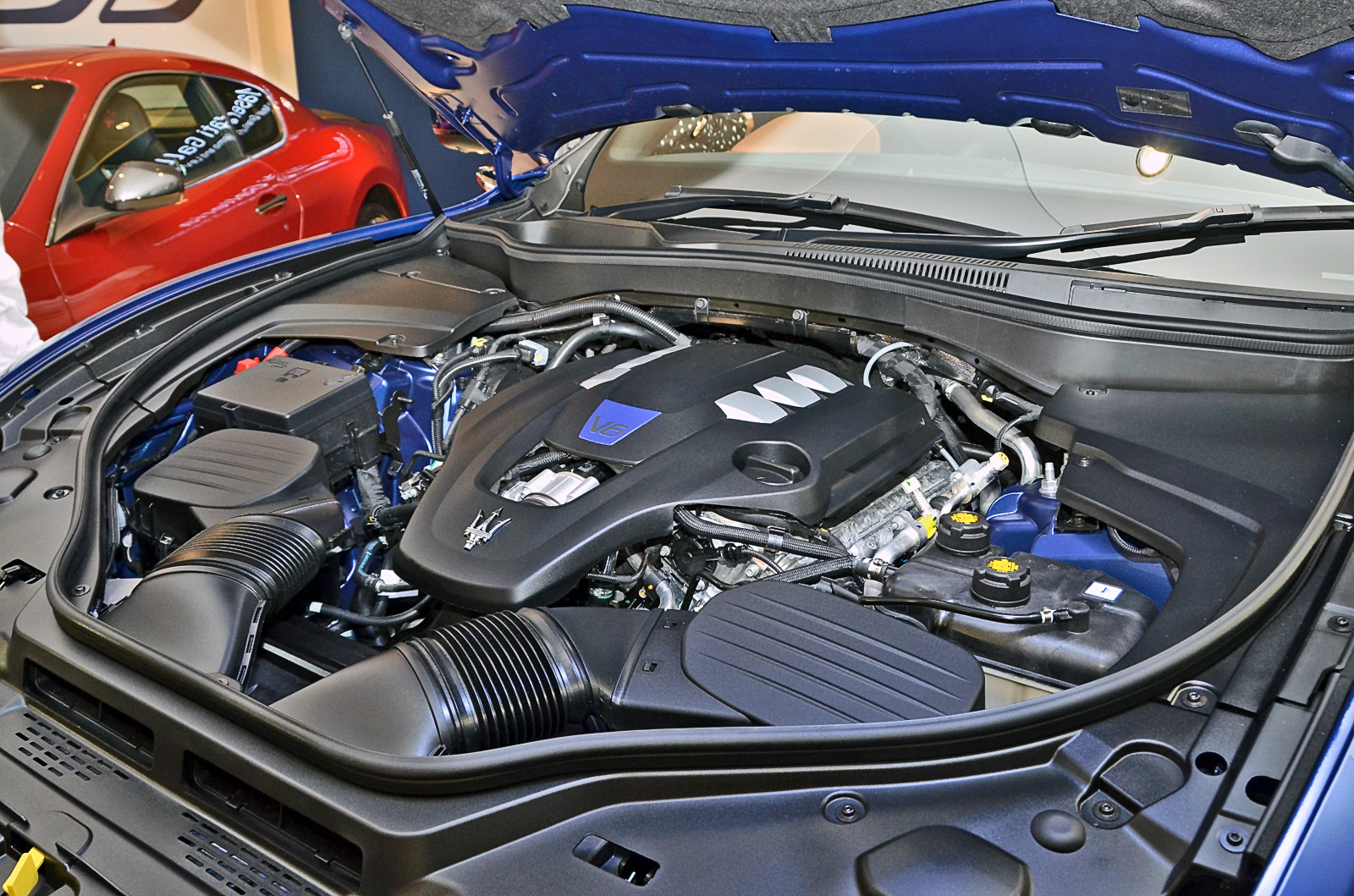
The F160 V6 engine bay of Maserati Levante

== Applications ==
=== Maserati ===
Eng. code	Displacement Bore x stroke	Years	Usage	Peak power	Peak torque
F160 AM	2,979 cc (182 cu in); 86.5x84.5 mm	2013–2017	Maserati Quattroporte S, Maserati Ghibli S	410 PS (302 kW; 404 hp) at 5500 rpm	550 N⋅m (406 lbf⋅ft) at 1750-5000 rpm
F160 AN	2,979 cc (182 cu in); 86.5x84.5 mm	2013–2017	Maserati Quattroporte S Q4, Maserati Ghibli S Q4	410 PS (302 kW; 404 hp) at 5500 rpm	550 N⋅m (406 lbf⋅ft) at 1750-5000 rpm
	2,979 cc (182 cu in); 86.5x84.5 mm	2018–2024	Maserati Levante S, Maserati Ghibli S / S Q4, Maserati Quattroporte S / S Q4	430 PS (316 kW; 424 hp) at 5750 rpm	580 N⋅m (428 lbf⋅ft) at 2000-4750 rpm
F160 AO	2,979 cc (182 cu in); 86.5x84.5 mm	2013–2016	Maserati Ghibli, Maserati Quattroporte	330 PS (243 kW; 325 hp) at 5000 rpm	500 N⋅m (369 lbf⋅ft) at 1750-4500 rpm
	2,979 cc (182 cu in); 86.5x84.5 mm	2016–2024	Maserati Ghibli, Maserati Levante, Maserati Quattroporte	350 PS (257 kW; 345 hp) at 5750 rpm	500 N⋅m (369 lbf⋅ft) at 1750-4750 rpm
