= List of Maserati vehicles =

Maserati has produced a number of production cars, racing cars and concept car models during its history since 1914.

The total number of cars built of a certain model prior 2001 often is difficult to determine. Figures vary with the source and even Maserati states different numbers for the same model. This information therefore has been kept off the list.

== Road vehicles ==
Model	First Year	Last Year	Distribution	Engine	Displacement cc	Power PS(kW)	Notes
A6 1500	1946	1950	international	I6	1,489 cc (91 cu in)	65 PS (48 kW; 64 bhp)	1 or 3 Carburettors
A6G 2000	1950	1951	international	I6	1,954 cc (119 cu in)	100 PS (74 kW; 99 bhp)	1 or 3 Carburettors
A6G54	1954	1956	international	I6	1,986 cc (121 cu in)	150 PS (110 kW; 148 bhp)	3 Carburettors
A6G54 ('56)	1956	1957	international	I6	1,986 cc (121 cu in)	160 PS (118 kW; 158 bhp)	3 Carburettors, Twin Ignition
150 GT	1957	1957	Prototype	I4	1,484.1 cc (91 cu in)	130 PS (96 kW; 128 bhp)	2 Carburettors, Twin Ignition
3500 GT Touring	1957	1962	international	I6	3,485 cc (213 cu in)	220–230 PS (162–169 kW; 217–227 bhp)	3 Carburettors
3500 GT Spyder Vignale	1959	1962	international	I6	3,485 cc (213 cu in)	220–230 PS (162–169 kW; 217–227 bhp)	3 Carburettors
5000 GT	1959	1961	international	V8	4,938 cc (301 cu in) AM 103	340 PS (250 kW; 335 bhp)	4 Carburettors, dry sump
5000 GT ('61)	1961	1964	international	V8	4,941 cc (302 cu in) AM 103	330 PS (243 kW; 325 bhp)	Fuel Injection, wet sump
3500 GTI	1962	1964	international	I6	3,485 cc (213 cu in)	235 PS (173 kW; 232 bhp)	Fuel Injection
3500 GTI Spyder	1962	1964	international	I6	3,485 cc (213 cu in)	235 PS (173 kW; 232 bhp)	Fuel Injection
Mistral 3500	1963	1965	international	I6	3,485 cc (213 cu in)	235 PS (173 kW; 232 bhp)	Fuel Injection
Quattroporte	1963	1966	international	V8	4,136 cc (252 cu in) AM 107	260 PS (191 kW; 256 bhp)	4 Carburettors
3500 GTI Spyder Frua	1964	1965	international	I6	3,485 cc (213 cu in)	235 PS (173 kW; 232 bhp)	Fuel Injection
Mistral 3700	1965	1970	international	I6	3,692 cc (225 cu in)	245 PS (180 kW; 242 bhp)	Fuel Injection
Mistral 3700 Spyder	1965	1970	international	I6	3,692 cc (225 cu in)	245 PS (180 kW; 242 bhp)	Fuel Injection
Mistral 4000	1965	1970	international	I6	4,000 cc (244 cu in)	255 PS (188 kW; 252 bhp)	Fuel Injection
Mistral 4000 Spyder	1965	1970	international	I6	4,000 cc (244 cu in)	255 PS (188 kW; 252 bhp)	Fuel Injection
Sebring 3700	1965	1969	international	I6	3,692 cc (225 cu in)	245 PS (180 kW; 242 bhp)	Fuel Injection
Sebring 4000	1965	1969	international	I6	4,000 cc (244 cu in)	255 PS (188 kW; 252 bhp)	Fuel Injection
Mexico 4200	1966	1969	international	V8	4,136 cc (252 cu in) AM 107	260 PS (191 kW; 256 bhp)	Carburettor
Quattroporte ('66)	1966	1970	international	V8	4,719 cc (288 cu in) AM 107/1	290 PS (213 kW; 286 bhp)	Carburettor
Ghibli	1967	1970	international	V8	4,719 cc (288 cu in) AM 115	310 PS (228 kW; 306 bhp)	Carburettor
Ghibli Spyder	1969	1970	international	V8	4,719 cc (288 cu in) AM 115	310 PS (228 kW; 306 bhp)	Carburettor
Mexico 4700	1969	1972	international	V8	4,719 cc (288 cu in) AM 107/1	310 PS (228 kW; 306 bhp)	Carburettor
Ghibli SS	1970	1973	international	V8	4,930 cc (301 cu in) AM 115	335 PS (246 kW; 330 bhp)	Carburettor
Ghibli SS Spyder	1970	1973	international	V8	4,930 cc (301 cu in) AM 115	335 PS (246 kW; 330 bhp)	Carburettor
Indy Europa 4200	1970	1971	international	V8	4,136 cc (252 cu in) AM 107	260 PS (191 kW; 256 bhp)	Carburettor
Indy Europa 4700	1971	1973	international	V8	4,719 cc (288 cu in) AM 107	290 PS (213 kW; 286 bhp)	Carburettor
Khamsin 4700	1972	1982	international	V8	4,719 cc (288 cu in) AM 107	290 PS (213 kW; 286 bhp)	Carburettor
Khamsin 4900	1972	1979	international	V8	4,930 cc (301 cu in) AM 115	320 PS (235 kW; 316 bhp)	Carburettor
Bora 4.7	1973	1974	international	V8	4,719 cc (288 cu in) AM 107	310 PS (228 kW; 306 bhp)	Carburettor
Indy 4900	1973	1975	international	V8	4,930 cc (301 cu in) AM 107	320 PS (235 kW; 316 bhp)	Carburettor
Merak	1973	1975	international	V6	2,965 cc (181 cu in) AM 114	190 PS (140 kW; 187 bhp)	Carburettor
Bora 4.9 (US)	1974	1980	USA only	V8	4,930 cc (301 cu in) AM 107	300 PS (221 kW; 296 bhp)	Carburettor
Quattroporte II	1974	1974	pre-production (6)	V6	2,965 cc (181 cu in) AM 114.56.30	190 PS (140 kW; 187 bhp)	Carburettor
Bora 4.9	1975	1980	international	V8	4,930 cc (301 cu in) AM 107	330 PS (243 kW; 325 bhp)	Carburettor
Merak SS	1975	1978	international	V6	2,965 cc (181 cu in) AM 114	220 PS (162 kW; 217 bhp)	Carburettor
Quattroporte II ('75)	1975	1978	Limited serie (7)	V6	3,200 cc (195 cu in) AM 114	200 PS (147 kW; 197 bhp)	Carburettor
4porte (Quattroporte III)	1976	1981	international	V8	4,136 cc (252 cu in) AM 107.23.49	255 PS (188 kW; 252 bhp)	Carburettor
Kyalami 4200	1976	1978	international	V8	4,136 cc (252 cu in) AM 107	253–265 PS (186–195 kW; 250–261 bhp)	Carburettor
Merak 2000 GT	1976	1983	Italy	V6	1,999 cc (122 cu in) AM 114	159–170 PS (117–125 kW; 157–168 bhp)	Carburettor
Kyalami 4900	1978	1983	international	V8	4,930 cc (301 cu in) AM 107	280 PS (206 kW; 276 bhp)	Carburettor
Khamsin ('79)	1979	1982	international	V8	4,930 cc (301 cu in) AM 115	280 PS (206 kW; 276 bhp)	Carburettor
Merak SS ('79)	1979	1983	international	V6	2,965 cc (181 cu in) AM 114	208 PS (153 kW; 205 bhp)	Carburettor
Quattroporte III ('81)	1981	1985	international	V8	4,930 cc (301 cu in) AM 107	282 PS (207 kW; 278 bhp)	Carburettor
Biturbo	1981	1985	Italy	V6 Biturbo	1,995 cc (122 cu in) AM 452	180 PS (132 kW; 178 bhp)	Carburettor
425	1983	1989	international	V6 Biturbo	2,491 cc (152 cu in) AM 453	200 PS (147 kW; 197 bhp)	Carburettor
Biturbo E	1983	1985	international	V6 Biturbo	2,491 cc (152 cu in) AM 453	185 PS (136 kW; 182 bhp)	Carburettor
Biturbo S	1983	1985	Italy	V6 Biturbo	1,995 cc (122 cu in) AM 452	205 PS (151 kW; 202 bhp)	Carburettor
Biturbo S (2.5)	1984	1987	international	V6 Biturbo	2,491 cc (152 cu in) AM 453	196 PS (144 kW; 193 bhp)	Carburettor, Catalyst
Spyder (Zagato)	1984	1988	Italy	V6 Biturbo	1,995 cc (122 cu in) AM 452	180 PS (132 kW; 178 bhp)	Carburettor
Spyder (2.5)	1984	1988	international	V6 Biturbo	2,491 cc (152 cu in) AM 453	192 PS (141 kW; 189 bhp)	Carburettor, Catalyst
420	1985	1994	Italy	V6 Biturbo	1,995 cc (122 cu in) AM 452	180 PS (132 kW; 178 bhp)	Carburettor
Biturbo (II)	1985	1987	Italy	V6 Biturbo	1,995 cc (122 cu in) AM 452	180 PS (132 kW; 178 bhp)	Carburettor
Biturbo E (II 2.5)	1985	1988	international	V6 Biturbo	2,491 cc (152 cu in) AM 453	185 PS (136 kW; 182 bhp)	Carburettor, Catalyst
Biturbo S (II)	1985	1986	Italy	V6 Biturbo	1,995 cc (122 cu in) AM 452	210 PS (154 kW; 207 bhp)	Carburettor
228 (228i)	1986	1992	international	V6 Biturbo	2,790 cc (170 cu in) AM 473	250 PS (184 kW; 247 bhp)	Fuel Injection, no Cat.
228 (228i) Kat	1986	1992	international	V6 Biturbo	2,790 cc (170 cu in) AM 473	225 PS (165 kW; 222 bhp)	Fuel Injection, Catalyst
420i	1986	1994	Italy	V6 Biturbo	1,995 cc (122 cu in) AM 470	190 PS (140 kW; 187 bhp)	Fuel Injection (Cat?)
420 S	1986	1994	Italy	V6 Biturbo	1,995 cc (122 cu in) AM 452	210 PS (154 kW; 207 bhp)	Carburettor, no Cat
Biturbo i	1986	1990	Italy	V6 Biturbo	1,995 cc (122 cu in) AM 470	185 PS (136 kW; 182 bhp)	Fuel Injection (Cat)
Quattroporte Royale (III)	1986	1990	international	V8	4,930 cc (301 cu in) AM 107.23.50	300 PS (221 kW; 296 bhp)	Fuel Injection, not Cat
Spyder i	1986	1987	international	V6 Biturbo	1,996 cc (122 cu in) AM 470	185 PS (136 kW; 182 bhp)	Fuel Injection, (Cat?)
430	1987	1990	international	V6 Biturbo	2,790 cc (170 cu in) AM 473	225 PS (165 kW; 222 bhp)	Fuel Injection, Catalyst
425i	1987	1990	international	V6 Biturbo	2,491 cc (152 cu in) AM 472	188 PS (138 kW; 185 bhp)	Fuel Injection, Catalyst
Biturbo Si	1987	1988	Italy	V6 Biturbo	1,995 cc (122 cu in) AM 471	220 PS (162 kW; 217 bhp)	Fuel Injection, no Cat
Biturbo Si (2.5)	1987	1988	international	V6 Biturbo	2,491 cc (152 cu in) AM 472	188 PS (138 kW; 185 bhp)	Fuel Injection, Catalyst
Spyder i ('87)	1987	1988	international	V6 Biturbo	1,996 cc (122 cu in) AM 471	195 PS (143 kW; 192 bhp)	Fuel Injection (Cat?)
222	1988	1990	Italy	V6 Biturbo	1,996 cc (122 cu in) AM 471	220 PS (162 kW; 217 bhp)	Fuel Injection, Catalyst
422	1988	1990	Italy	V6 Biturbo	1,996 cc (122 cu in) AM 471	220 PS (162 kW; 217 bhp)	Fuel Injection, Catalyst
2.24V	1988	1992	Italy (probably)	V6 Biturbo	1,996 cc (122 cu in) AM 475	245 PS (180 kW; 242 bhp)	Fuel Injection, no Cat
222 4v	1988	1991	international	V6 Biturbo	2,790 cc (170 cu in) AM 477	279 PS (205 kW; 275 bhp)	Fuel Injection, Catalyst
222 E	1988	1990	international	V6 Biturbo	2,790 cc (170 cu in) AM 473	225 PS (165 kW; 222 bhp)	Fuel Injection, Catalyst
Karif	1988	1993	international	V6 Biturbo	2,790 cc (170 cu in) AM 473	285 PS (210 kW; 281 bhp)	Fuel Injection, no Cat
Karif (kat)	1988	1993	international	V6 Biturbo	2,790 cc (170 cu in) AM 473	248 PS (182 kW; 245 bhp)	Fuel Injection, Catalyst
Karif (kat II)	1988	1993	international	V6 Biturbo	2,790 cc (170 cu in) AM 473	225 PS (165 kW; 222 bhp)	Fuel Injection, Catalyst
Spyder i (2.5)	1988	1989	international	V6 Biturbo	2,491 cc (152 cu in) AM 472	188 PS (138 kW; 185 bhp)	Fuel Injection, Catalyst
Spyder i (2.8)	1989	1994	international	V6 Biturbo	2,790 cc (170 cu in) AM 473	250 PS (184 kW; 247 bhp)	Fuel Injection, no Cat
Spyder i (2.8, kat)	1989	1994	international	V6 Biturbo	2,790 cc (170 cu in) AM 473	225 PS (165 kW; 222 bhp)	Fuel Injection, Catalyst
Spyder i ('90)	1989	1994	Italy	V6 Biturbo	1,996 cc (122 cu in) AM 47	220 PS (162 kW; 217 bhp)	Fuel Injection, Catalyst
222 SE	1990	1991	international	V6 Biturbo	2,790 cc (170 cu in) AM 473	250 PS (184 kW; 247 bhp)	Fuel Injection, no Cat
222 SE (kat)	1990	1991	international	V6 Biturbo	2,790 cc (170 cu in) AM 473	225 PS (165 kW; 222 bhp)	Fuel Injection, Catalyst
4.18v	1990	1994	Italy	V6 Biturbo	1,995 cc (122 cu in) AM 471	220 PS (162 kW; 217 bhp)	Fuel Injection, Catalyst
4.24v	1990	1992	Italy (probably)	V6 Biturbo	1,996 cc (122 cu in) AM 475	245 PS (180 kW; 242 bhp)	Fuel Injection, no Cat
Shamal	1990	1996	international	V8 Biturbo	3,217 cc (196 cu in) AM 479	326 PS (240 kW; 322 bhp)	Fuel Injection, Catalyst
2.24v II	1991	1993	Italy	V6 Biturbo	1,996 cc (122 cu in) AM 475	245 PS (180 kW; 242 bhp)	Fuel Injection, no Cat
2.24v II (kat)	1991	1993	international (probably)	V6 Biturbo	1,996 cc (122 cu in) AM 475	240 PS (177 kW; 237 bhp)	Fuel Injection, Catalyst
222 SR	1991	1994	international	V6 Biturbo	2,790 cc (170 cu in) AM 473	225 PS (165 kW; 222 bhp)	Fuel Injection, Catalyst
4.24v II (kat)	1991	1994	Italy (probably)	V6 Biturbo	1,996 cc (122 cu in) AM 475	240 PS (177 kW; 237 bhp)	Fuel Injection, Catalyst
430 4v	1991	1994	international	V6 Biturbo	2,790 cc (170 cu in) AM 477	279 PS (205 kW; 275 bhp)	Fuel Injection, Catalyst
Racing	1991	1991	Italy	V6 Biturbo	1,996 cc (122 cu in) AM 490	283 PS (208 kW; 279 bhp)	Fuel Injection, no Cat, no oxygen sensor
Spyder III	1991	1994	Italy	V6 Biturbo	1,996 cc (122 cu in) AM 475	245 PS (180 kW; 242 bhp)	Fuel Injection, no Cat
Spyder III (2.8, kat)	1991	1994	international	V6 Biturbo	2,790 cc (170 cu in) AM 475	225 PS (165 kW; 222 bhp)	Fuel Injection, Catalyst
Spyder III (kat)	1991	1994	Italy	V6 Biturbo	1,996 cc (122 cu in) AM 475	240 PS (177 kW; 237 bhp)	Fuel Injection, Catalyst
Barchetta Stradale	1992	1992	Prototype	V6 Biturbo	1,996 cc (122 cu in) AM 501	306 PS (225 kW; 302 bhp)	Fuel Injection, Catalyst
Ghibli II (2.0)	1992	1997	Italy	V6 Biturbo	1,996 cc (122 cu in) AM 475	306 PS (225 kW; 302 bhp)	Fuel Injection, Catalyst
Ghibli II (2.8)	1993	1997	international	V6 Biturbo	2,790 cc (170 cu in) AM 574	284 PS (209 kW; 280 bhp)	Fuel Injection, Catalyst
Quattroporte (2.0)	1994	1998	Italy	V6 Biturbo	1,996 cc (122 cu in) AM 573	287 PS (211 kW; 283 bhp)	Fuel Injection, Catalyst
Quattroporte (2.8)	1994	1998	international	V6 Biturbo	2,790 cc (170 cu in) AM 574	284 PS (209 kW; 280 bhp)	Fuel Injection, Catalyst
Ghibli Cup	1995	1997	international	V6 Biturbo	1,996 cc (122 cu in) AM 577	330 PS (243 kW; 325 bhp)	Fuel Injection, Catalyst
Quattroporte Ottocilindri	1996	1998	international	V8 Biturbo	3,217 cc (196 cu in) AM 578	335 PS (246 kW; 330 bhp)	Fuel Injection, Catalyst
Ghibli Primatist	1996	1997	international	V6 Biturbo	1,996 cc (122 cu in) AM 496	306 PS (225 kW; 302 bhp)	Fuel Injection, Catalyst
3200 GT	1998	2001	international	V8 Biturbo	3,217 cc (196 cu in) AM 585	370 PS (272 kW; 365 bhp)	Fuel Injection, Catalyst
Quattroporte V6 Evoluzione	1998	2001	international	V6 Biturbo	2,790 cc (170 cu in) AM 574	280 PS (206 kW; 276 bhp)	Fuel Injection, Catalyst
Quattroporte V8 Evoluzione	1998	2001	international	V8 Biturbo	3,217 cc (196.3 cu in) AM 578	335 PS (246 kW; 330 bhp)	Fuel Injection, Catalyst
3200 GTA	1999	2002	international	V8 Biturbo	3,217 cc (196.3 cu in) AM 585	370 PS (272 kW; 365 bhp)	Automatic transmission
Coupé	2002	2007	international	V8	4,244 cc (259 cu in)	390 PS (287 kW; 385 bhp)	Cambiocorsa available
Spyder	2001	2007	international	V8	4,244 cc (259 cu in)	390 PS (287 kW; 385 bhp)	Cambiocorsa available
GranSport	2004	2007	international	V8	4,244 cc (259 cu in)	400 PS (294 kW; 395 bhp)	with Cambiocorsa only
GranSport Spyder	2005	2007	international	V8	4,244 cc (259 cu in)	400 PS (294 kW; 395 bhp)	with Cambiocorsa only
Quattroporte V	2003	2012	international	V8	4,244 cc (259 cu in)	400 PS (294 kW; 395 bhp)	DuoSelect or Automatica
Quattroporte V S	2008	2012	international	V8	4,691 cc (286 cu in)	430 PS (316 kW; 424 bhp)	Automatica only
MC12	2004	2005	Limited (50 cars)	V12	5,998 cc (366 cu in)	630 PS (463 kW; 621 bhp)	Developed from Enzo Ferrari
GranTurismo	2007	2019	international	V8	4,244 cc (259 cu in)	405 PS (298 kW; 399 bhp)	
GranTurismo S	2008	2019	international	V8	4,691 cc (286 cu in)	440 PS (324 kW; 434 bhp)	
GranCabrio	2010	2019	international	V8	4,691 cc (286 cu in)	440 PS (324 kW; 434 bhp)	
Ghibli III	2013	2024	international	V6 Biturbo	2,979 cc (182 cu in)	330 PS (243 kW; 325 bhp)	
Ghibli III S	2013	2024	international	V6 Biturbo	2,979 cc (182 cu in)	410 PS (302 kW; 404 bhp)	Q4 (AWD) available
Ghibli III Diesel	2013	2024	international	V6 Turbodiesel	2,987 cc (182 cu in)	275 PS (202 kW; 271 bhp)	
Quattroporte VI S	2013	2023	international	V6 Biturbo	2,979 cc (182 cu in)	410 PS (302 kW; 404 bhp)	Q4 (AWD) available
Quattroporte VI GTS	2013	2023	international	V6 Biturbo	3,798 cc (232 cu in)	530 PS (390 kW; 523 bhp)	
Quattroporte VI Diesel	2013	2023	international	V6 Turbodiesel	2,987 cc (182 cu in)	275 PS (202 kW; 271 bhp)	
Levante	2016	2024	international	V6 Biturbo	2,992 cc (183 cu in)	350 to 580 PS (257 to 427 kW; 345 to 572 bhp)	
MC20	2020		international	V6 Biturbo	2,992 cc (183 cu in)	630 PS (463 kW; 621 bhp)	
Levante Hybrid	2022	2024	international	I4 Turbo	1,995 cc (122 cu in)	330 PS (243 kW; 325 bhp)	First Levante with MHEV
Grecale	2022		international	I4 Turbo	1,995 cc (122 cu in)	300 or 330 PS (221 or 243 kW; 296 or 325 bhp)	
Grecale Trofeo	2022		international	V6 Biturbo	2,992 cc (183 cu in)	630 PS (463 kW; 621 bhp)	
MC20 Cielo	2023		international	V6 Biturbo	2,992 cc (183 cu in)	630 PS (463 kW; 621 bhp)	
GranTurismo II	2023		international	V6 Biturbo	2,992 cc (183 cu in)	630 PS (463 kW; 621 bhp)	
GranCabrio II	2024		international	V6 Biturbo	2,992 cc (183 cu in)	630 PS (463 kW; 621 bhp)	

== Racing vehicles ==
Model	Year	Type	Engine	Displacement cc	Power	Notes
Tipo 26	1926	Grand Prix	I8 s/c	1,493 cc (91.1 cu in)	128 PS (94 kW; 126 bhp)	Developed from the Diatto racer designed by Maserati
Tipo 26B	1927	Grand Prix	I8 s/c	1,980 cc (121 cu in)	155 PS (114 kW; 153 bhp)	
Tipo 26R	1928	Grand Prix	I8 s/c	1,691 cc (103.2 cu in)	140 PS (103 kW; 138 bhp)	
Tipo 26C	1929	Grand Prix	I8 s/c	1,079 cc (65.8 cu in)	110 PS (81 kW; 108 bhp)	
Tipo V4 "Sedici Cilindri"	1929	Grand Prix	V16 s/c	3,961 cc (241.7 cu in)	305 PS (224 kW; 301 bhp)	
Tipo 26M	1930	Grand Prix	I8 s/c	2,495 cc (152.3 cu in)	185 PS (136 kW; 182 bhp)	
8C 2800	1931	Grand Prix	I8 s/c	2,812 cc (171.6 cu in)	205 PS (151 kW; 202 bhp)	
Tipo V5	1932	Grand Prix	V16 s/c	4,905 cc (299.3 cu in)	330 PS (243 kW; 325 bhp)	
8C 3000	1932	Grand Prix	I8 s/c	2,991 cc (182.5 cu in)	220 PS (162 kW; 217 bhp)	Two-seater
8CM	1933	Grand Prix	I8 s/c	2,991 cc (182.5 cu in)	240 PS (177 kW; 237 bhp)	Monoplace
6CM	1936	Voiturette	I6	1,100 cc (67 cu in); 1,500 cc (92 cu in); 2,500 cc (153 cu in)	155–175 PS (114–129 kW; 153–173 bhp)	
8CTF	1938	Grand Prix	I8 s/c	2,991 cc (182.5 cu in)		two-time Indy 500 winner
4CL	1939	Voiturette	I4	1,491 cc (91.0 cu in)		
4CLT	1948	Formula One	I4	1,491 cc (91.0 cu in)	260 PS (191 kW; 256 bhp)	
250F	1953	Formula One	I6	2,493 cc (152.1 cu in)	270 PS (199 kW; 266 bhp)	
300S	1955	Sports car	I6	3,000 cc (180 cu in)	245 bhp (183 kW)	
350S	1957	Sports car	I6	3,500 cc (210 cu in)	325 PS (239 kW; 321 bhp)	
450S	1957	Sports car	V8	4,500 cc (270 cu in)	400 PS (294 kW; 395 bhp)	
420M/58	1958	Single-seater	V8	4,190 cc (256 cu in)	410 PS (302 kW; 404 bhp)	Race of Two Worlds
Tipo 60 "Birdcage"	1959	Sports car	I4	1,990 cc (121 cu in)	200 PS (147 kW; 197 bhp)	
Tipo 61 "Birdcage"	1959	Sports car	I4	2,890 cc (176 cu in)	250 PS (184 kW; 247 bhp)	
Tipo 151	1962	Sports car	V8	4,941 cc (301.5 cu in)	430 PS (316 kW; 424 bhp)	
Barchetta	1991	Sports car	V6 Biturbo	1,996 cc (122 cu in) AM 501	319 PS (235 kW; 315 bhp)	one-make racing series
Tipo Folgore	2023	Formula E	Electric	N/A	476 PS (350 kW; 469 bhp)	

== Concept vehicles ==
The following is a list of concept and prototype cars that carry the name of Italian manufacturer Maserati, listed in the chronological order of their presentation.

Concept car	Debut date and venue	Designer	Image
Maserati Simun	November 1968; Turin Auto Show	Giorgetto Giugiaro and Ghia	
Maserati Boomerang	November 1971; Turin Auto Show	Italdesign Giugiaro	
Maserati Coupé 2+2	1974	Italdesign Giugiaro	
Maserati Medici	October 1974; Turin Auto Show	Italdesign Giugiaro	
Maserati Medici II	October 1976; Paris Motor Show	Italdesign Giugiaro	
Maserati Chubasco	1990	Marcello Gandini	
Spider Maserati-Opac	April 1992; Turin Auto Show	Opac	
Maserati Buran	March 2000; Geneva Motor Show	Fabrizio and Giorgetto Giugiaro; Italdesign Giugiaro	
Maserati 320S	March 2001; Geneva Motor Show	Italdesign Giugiaro	
Maserati Kubang GT Wagon	January 2003; Detroit Auto Show	Italdesign Giugiaro	
Maserati Birdcage 75th	March 2005; Geneva Motor Show	Pininfarina	
Maserati A8GCS	May 2008; Concorso d'Eleganza Villa d'Este	Carrozzeria Touring	
Maserati Kubang	September 2011; Frankfurt Motor Show	Centro Stile Maserati	
Maserati Alfieri	March 2014; Geneva Motor Show	Centro Stile Maserati	
