= Maserati Shamal =

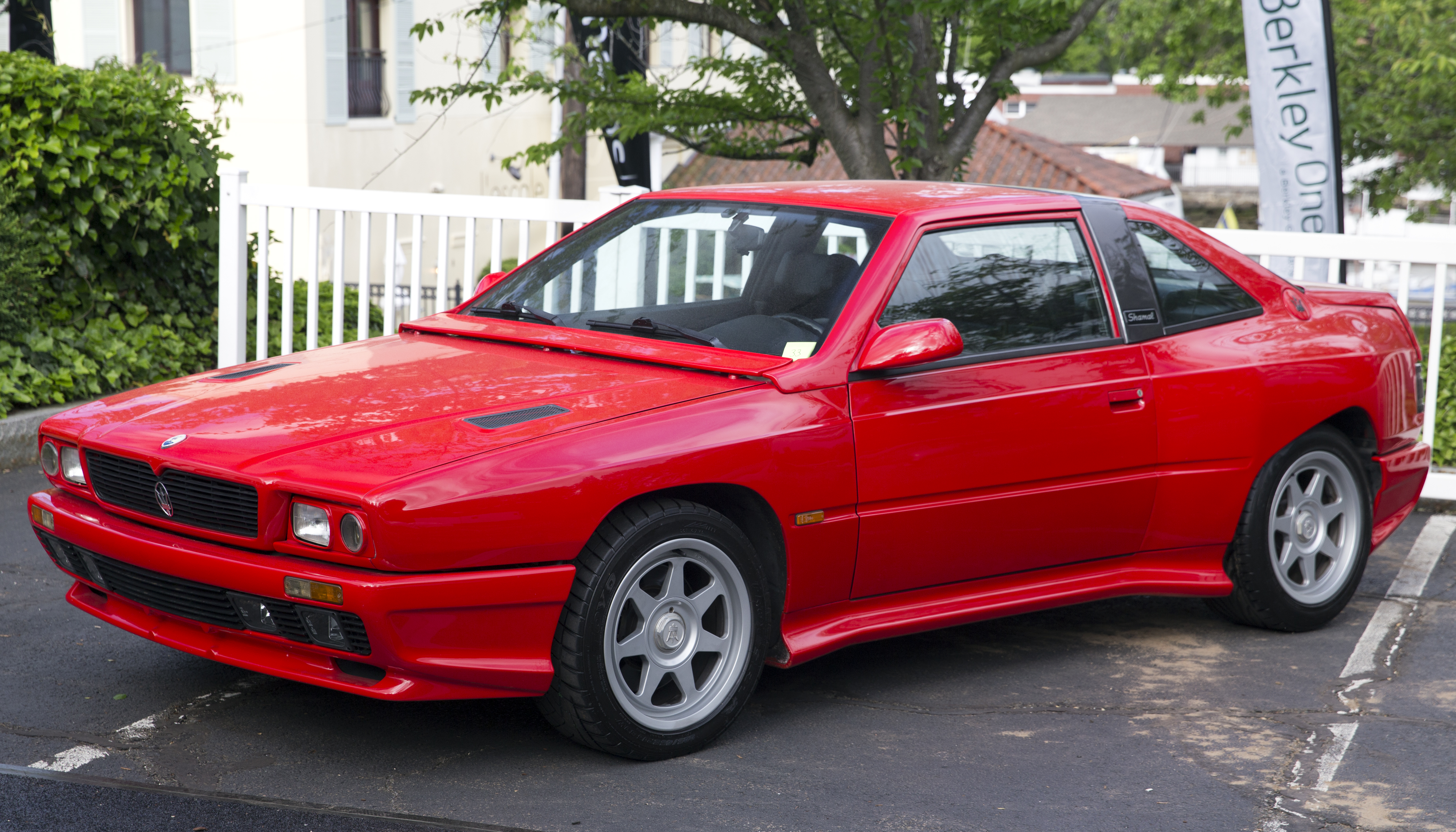

Overview
- Manufacturer: Maserati
- Production: 1990–1996; 369 produced
- Assembly: Italy: Modena
- Designer: Marcello Gandini

Body and chassis
- Class: Grand tourer (S)
- Body style: 2-door 2+2 coupé
- Layout: Front-engine, rear-wheel-drive
- Related: Maserati Biturbo; Maserati Ghibli (AM336)

Powertrain
- Engine: 3.2 L AM 479 twin-turbocharged V8
- Transmission: 6-speed Getrag 560G manual

Dimensions
- Wheelbase: 2,400 mm (94.5 in)
- Length: 4,100 mm (161.4 in)
- Width: 1,850 mm (72.8 in)
- Height: 1,300 mm (51.2 in)
- Kerb weight: 1,417 kg (3,124 lb) (dry)

The Maserati Shamal (Tipo AM339) is a two-door grand touring coupé produced by Italian automobile manufacturer Maserati from 1990 to 1996. In keeping with an established Maserati tradition, it is named after a wind: shamal (Persian or Arabic for ‘north’), a hot summer wind that blows in large areas of Mesopotamia, particularly in the large plain between the Tigris and Euphrates.

With its newly developed twin-turbocharged V8, the Shamal was Maserati's flagship grand tourer, topping the lineup of V6-engined Biturbo coupés in both performance and price (at 125 million Lire).

== History ==
The Shamal was introduced on 14 December 1989 in Modena, when Maserati president and owner Alejandro de Tomaso showed it to the press. It was the last model announced under the De Tomaso ownership: in January 1990, half of debt-plagued Maserati was acquired by Fiat S.p.A. Sales began in 1990. The final year of production for the Maserati Shamal was 1996; factory figures indicate that 369 examples were produced.

In 2020, Maserati revisited the Shamal with the cyberpunk-themed Project Rekall restomod concept.

== Design ==
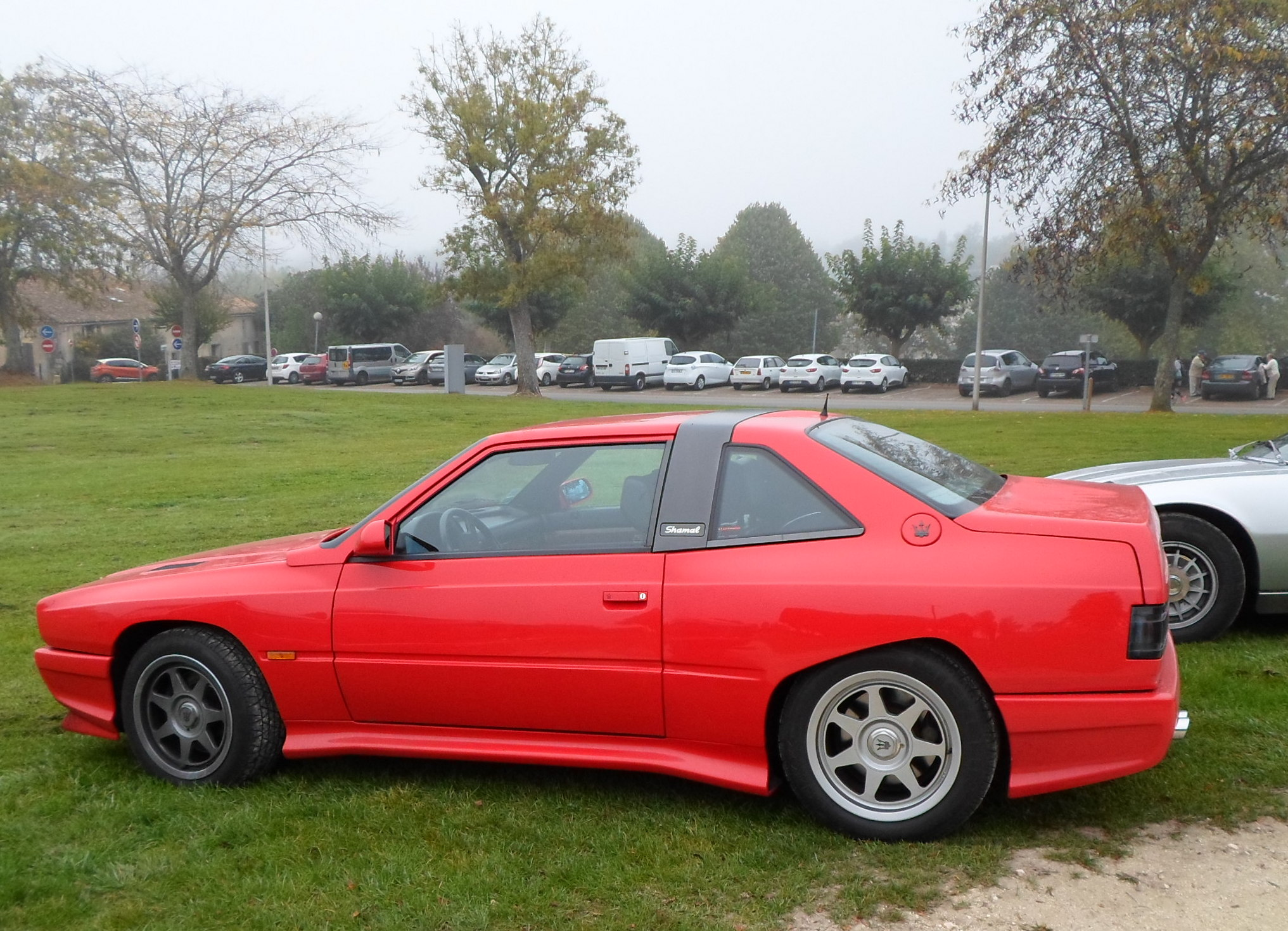
Maserati Shamal rear, side view

The Shamal was designed in collaboration by Marcello Gandini and Maserati's own Styling department. A debt ridden Maserati was not able to develop an entirely new car, and accordingly the Shamal shows its Biturbo heritage in the doors, interior, and basic bodyshell, which were carried over from the Biturbo. It sits on the shorter 2.4-meter wheelbase, as also used by the Biturbo Spyder and Karif. Gandini's styling signature is visible in the slanted profile of the rear wheel arch, also present on the Quattroporte IV and first seen on the Lamborghini Countach. An unusual design element introduced by Gandini on the Shamal was the additional spoiler in front of the windshield, also seen on his redesign of the DeTomaso Pantera and later across the remainder of Maserati's Biturbo-based lineup. It was intended to direct the flow of air (as well as water) across the windscreen and to push the wipers down at high speeds. The feature was never adapted by other automakers.

The center pillar is also an actual roll bar, not simply a styling element. Finished in black, it wraps around the cabin. "Shamal" badging appears on either side of the central pillar in chrome lettering. The car came with 16-inch alloy wheels, a small rear spoiler and a blacked-out grille with chrome accents, the only chrome element on the car aside from the badging.

Another defining feature of the Shamal are its numerous headlamps in individual housings: outer round Carello low beams of the then-new projector type, inner rectangular high beams, combined turn signals and position lamps in the bumper, and two pairs of square lights in the lower grille—fog lamps and driving lamps. This headlight design was then introduced across the rest of the updated Biturbo range in 1991.

The two-seat interior of the Shamal features extended leather seat cushions, temperature control and the famous Maserati oval clock, which is situated in the centre of the dashboard. It continued Maserati's tradition of building cars with cheerful, well-appointed interiors, with leather or wood coverings for almost anything one would touch, such as the center console, handbrake handle, or the gear lever which is finished in burled elm. While built for comfort as well as performance, the Shamal was not as luxuriously appointed as the contemporary Ghibli. The Shamal was initially only available in red or black exterior colours; other colours became available later in the production run.

== Specifications ==
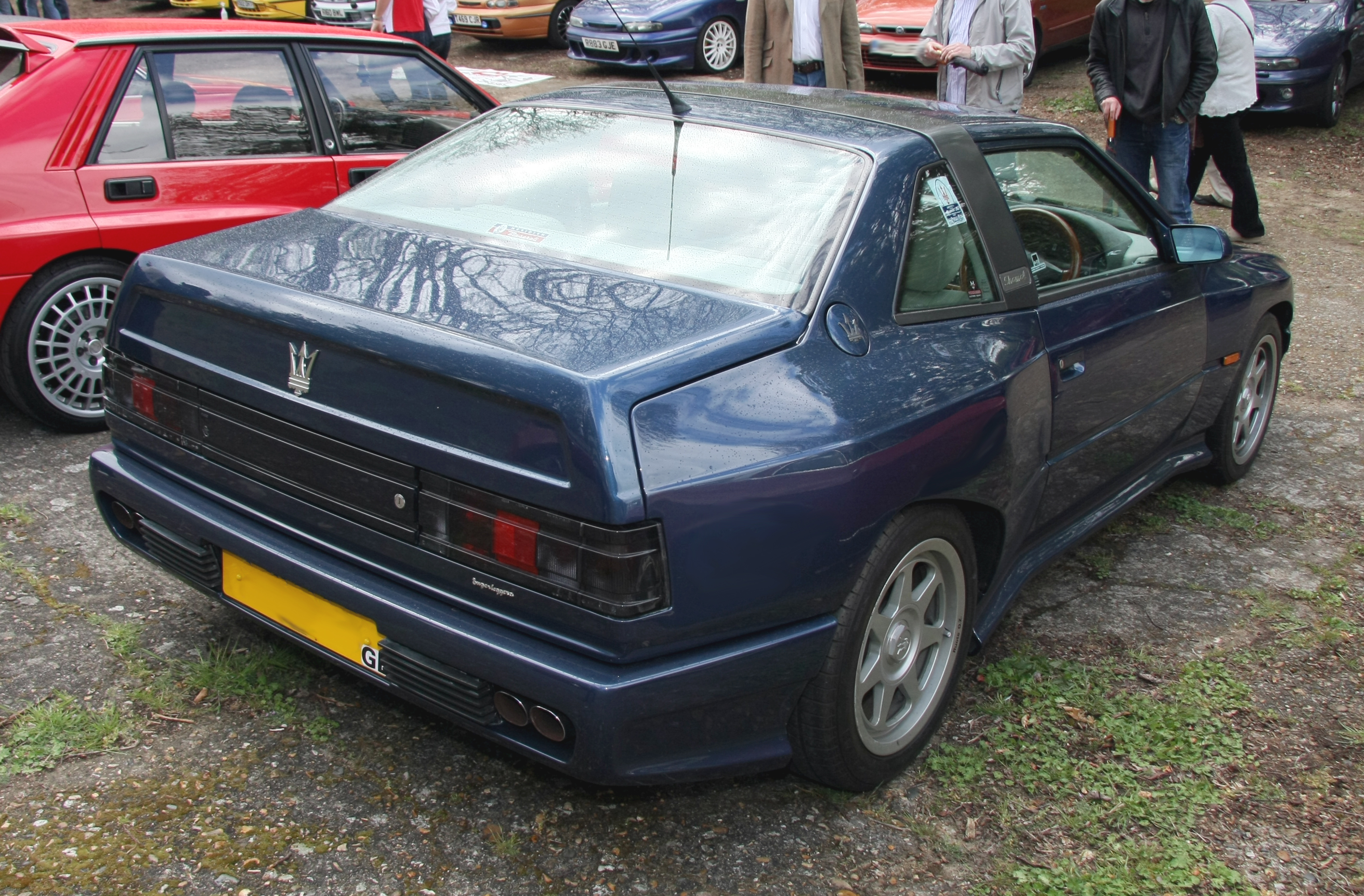
Rear view

The Shamal used a traditional front-engine, rear-wheel-drive layout and an all-steel unibody construction. Suspension was by MacPherson struts upfront and semi-trailing arms at the rear. All cars were equipped with an adaptive suspension developed by Maserati together with Koni. The system varied the damping rates, based on road conditions and the level of comfort desired. Mechanically, the Shamal was unusual in that its engine could be removed without a lift. It is mounted on a subframe (which also holds the intercoolers and the radiator) which can be slipped out the front once the front bumper has been removed.

The Shamal was powered by an AM 479 3,217 cc (3.2 L) (bore and stroke 80 mm or 3.1 in) V8 engine, with two overhead camshafts per cylinder bank, and four valves per cylinder. It was essentially the existing Biturbo V6 with an extra bank of cylinders added. It was twin-turbocharged with two IHI turbines and intercoolers, and equipped with a Marelli IAW integrated electronic ignition and fuel injection ECU per cylinder bank. The engine put out 326 PS (240 kW; 322 hp) at 6,000 rpm and 431 N⋅m (318 lb⋅ft) at 3,000 rpm. Power was sent to the rear wheels through a six-speed Getrag G560 manual transmission and Maserati's Ranger limited-slip differential. The transmission was the same as BMW installed in their 850CSi of the same era.

The manufacturer claimed a top speed of 270 km/h (168 mph) and a 0 to 100 km/h (0 to 62 mph) acceleration time of 5.3 seconds.
