= Maserati Biturbo =

Series of grand tourer automobiles made from 1981–1994

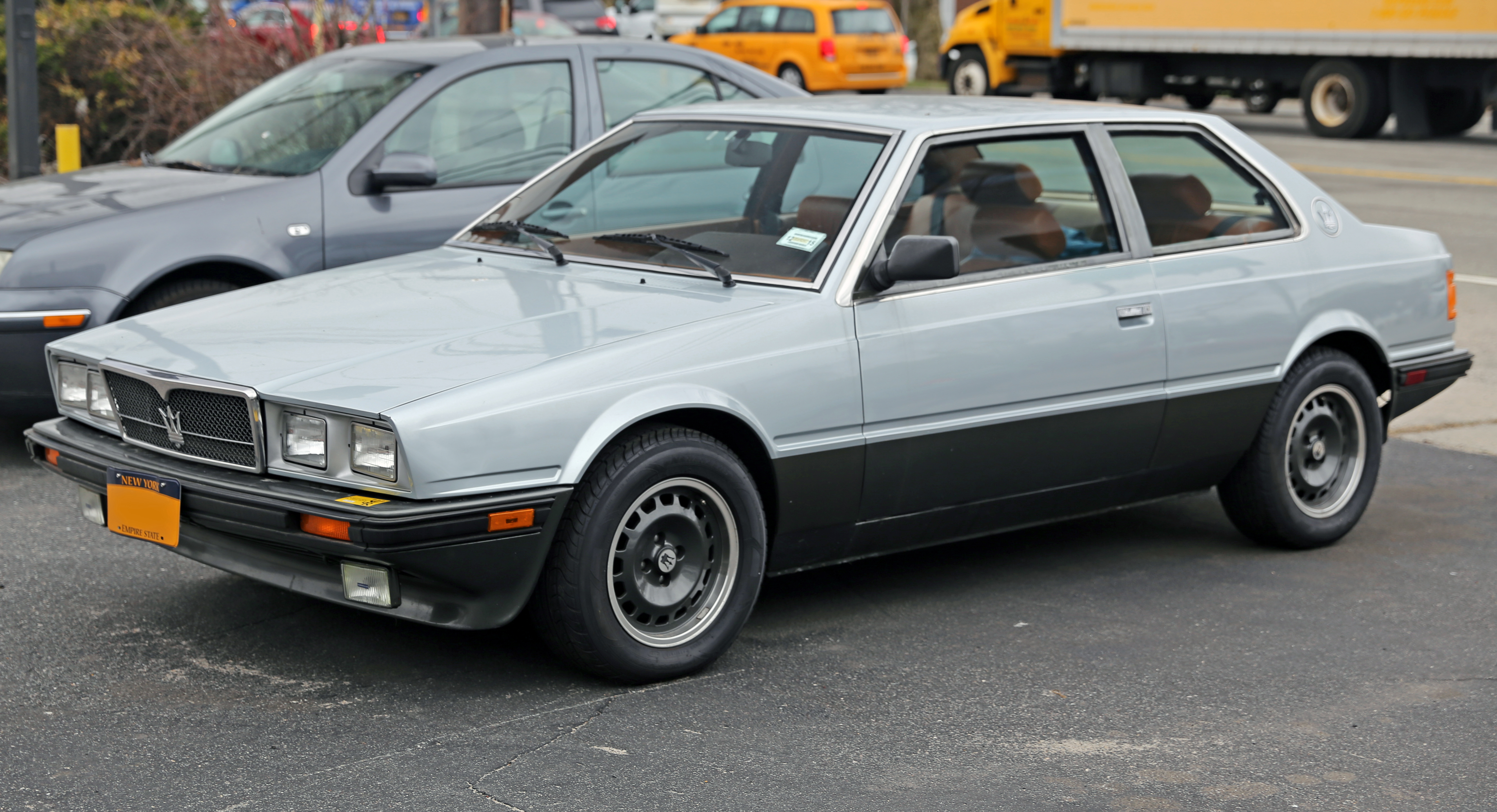
- Maserati Biturbo E

Overview
- Manufacturer: Maserati
- Production: 1981–1994
- Assembly: Coupé/Saloon: Italy: Modena (Maserati); Spyder: Italy: Terrazzano di Rho (Zagato)
- Designer: Pierangelo Andreani (1977); Marcello Gandini (1988 and 1991 facelifts); Giuseppe Mittino at Zagato (Spyder)

Body and chassis
- Class: Grand tourer
- Body style: 2-door 2+2 coupé; 2-door, 2+3 coupé (228); 4-door saloon/sedan; 2-door convertible
- Layout: Front-engine, rear-wheel-drive
- Related: Maserati Shamal; Maserati Ghibli (AM336); Maserati Barchetta; Maserati Quattroporte IV; Maserati Karif

Powertrain
- Engine: 2.0 L twin-turbocharged 90° V6; 2.5 L twin-turbocharged 90° V6; 2.8 L twin-turbocharged 90° V6
- Transmission: 5-speed ZF manual; 3-speed automatic; 4-speed ZF automatic

Dimensions
- Wheelbase: 2,514 mm (99.0 in) (coupé); 2,600 mm (102.4 in) (saloon, 228); 2,400 mm (94.5 in) (Spyder)
- Length: 4,150 mm (163.4 in) (coupé); 4,400 mm (173.2 in) (saloon); 4,040 mm (159.1 in) (Spyder); 4,460 mm (175.6 in) (228)
- Width: 1,710 mm (67.3 in) (coupé, Spyder); 1,730 mm (68.1 in) (saloon); 1,865 mm (73.4 in) (228)
- Height: 1,310 mm (51.6 in) (coupé, Spyder); 1,330 mm (52.4 in) (228); 1,360 mm (53.5 in) (saloon)

Chronology
- Successor: Maserati Ghibli (AM336) (Coupé); Maserati Quattroporte IV / Maserati Ghibli (M157) (Sedan)

The Maserati Biturbo is a family of executive grand tourers produced by Italian automobile manufacturer Maserati between 1981 and 1994. The original Biturbo was a two-door, four-seater notchback coupé (of somewhat smaller dimensions than the BMW 3 Series of the time) featuring, as the name implies, a two-litre V6 engine with two turbochargers and a luxurious interior.

The car was designed by Pierangelo Andreani, Chief of Centro Stile Maserati up to 1981, somewhat influenced by the design of the then recent Quattroporte III (penned by Italdesign Giugiaro).

All Maserati models introduced from the Biturbo's inception in 1981, until 1997, were based on variants of the original Biturbo architecture, including the later grand tourers like the Shamal and Ghibli II, as well as the 1994 fourth generation Quattroporte, which used an evolved and slightly stretched (to 2.65 m / 104.3 in wheelbase) Biturbo Saloon platform.

The Barchetta, while of a different layout entirely, used an ultimate version of the Biturbo V6 engine.

== History ==
When Alejandro de Tomaso acquired Maserati in 1976, he had ambitious plans for the marque. His plan was to combine the prestige of the Maserati brand with a sports car that would be more affordable, replacing the higher-priced models that had traditionally made up the Maserati range, such as the Bora and Khamsin which were developed under Citroën ownership.

The Biturbo was initially a strong seller and brought Italian prestige to a wide audience, with sales of about 40,000 units. Sales figures fell in subsequent years, as the Biturbo developed a reputation for poor quality and reliability. De Tomaso used another of his companies, Innocenti, to produce body panels of the car and also to provide final assembly. De Tomaso later sold Maserati to Fiat when he suffered losses, who grouped the company with their erstwhile rival Ferrari.

The Biturbo is ranked number 28 in the BBC book Crap Cars, and in 2007 it was selected as Time's worst car of 1984, although they ranked the Chrysler TC by Maserati as a "greater ignominy".

The Biturbo competed in the World Touring Car Championship (1987) and the European Touring Car Championship (1988, Marlboro Conquista Team) without any notable success. Until the carburetors were replaced with the fuel injection system, they also had serious overheating problems. The WTCC cars were then raced in Italian touring championships for the next couple of years, while one car was rallied in Group A specs.

The Biturbo was sold in the US from 1981 to 1990, with some leftover Biturbo Spiders being sold as 1991 models. Maserati would leave the US market until 2002's introduction of the Maserati Coupé.

=== Gandini's first restyling ===
Between 1987 and 1989, a facelift designed by Marcello Gandini was phased in, which helped to soften the sharp bodylines present on the original design. These changes first found their way onto the 1987 430. The redesign included a taller and more rounded grille with mesh grille and bonnet, aerodynamic wing mirrors and 15-inch disc-shaped alloy wheels, now mounted on 5-lug hubs. Some models received the wraparound bumpers with integral foglights and the deep sills introduced with the 2.24v in early 1989. Mechanical upgrades first seen on the 2.24v also began filtering through the Biturbo range in early 1989, including suspension and power steering improvements as well as ventilated front disc brakes.

=== Gandini's second restyling ===
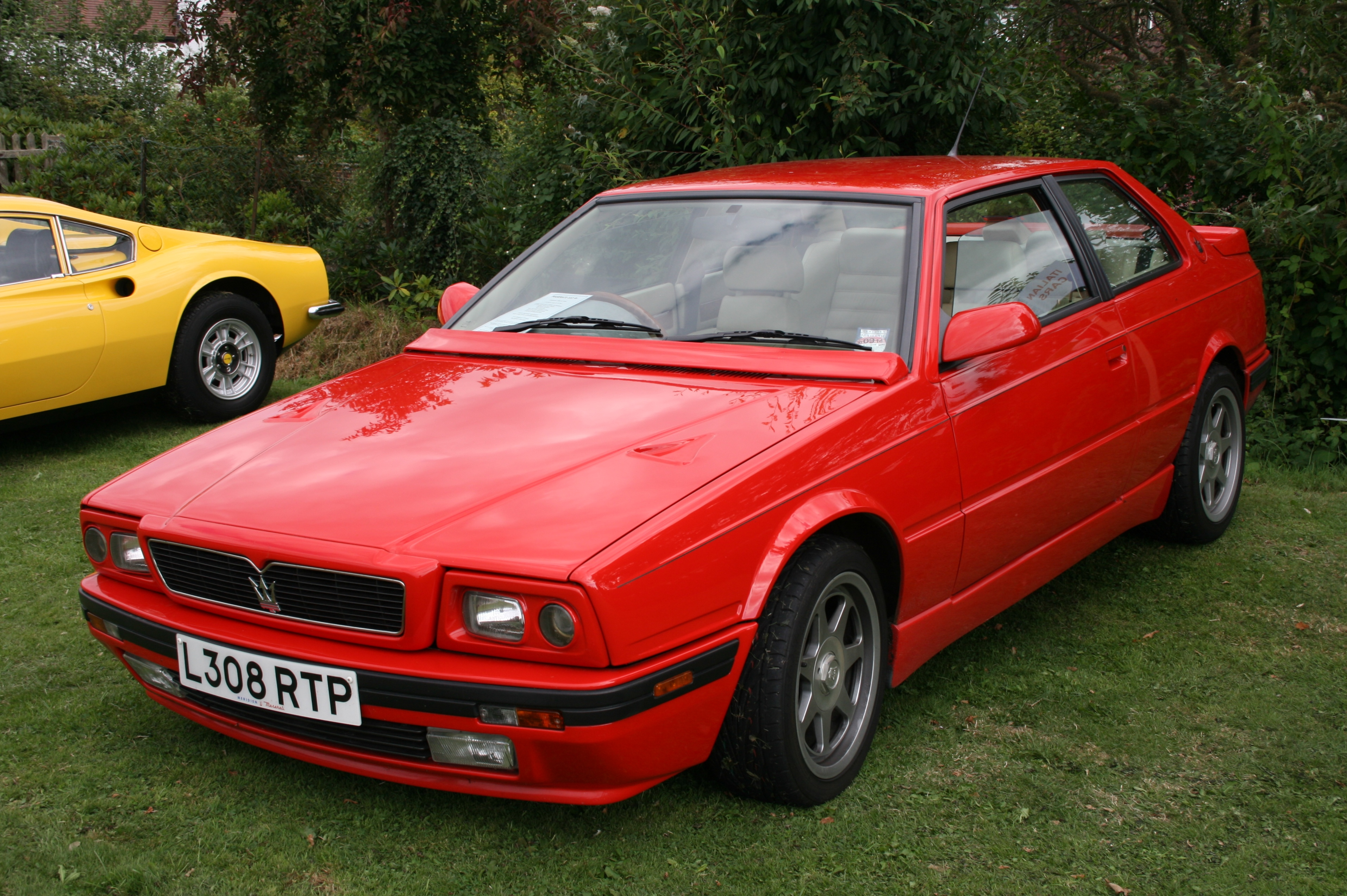
Maserati Biturbo (1991 Facelift)

In 1991, the entire lineup was restyled for a second time, again by the hand of Marcello Gandini; the design features introduced with the Shamal were spread to the other models. Gandini developed an aerodynamic kit that included a unique spoiler at the base of the windscreen hiding the windshield wipers, a rear spoiler, and side skirts. The new two-element headlights used poly-ellipsoidal projectors developed by Magneti-Marelli. Inset in body-colour housings, they flanked a redesigned grille, slimmer and integrated in the bonnet; the 1988 bumpers were adopted by all models. The 15-inch disc-shaped alloys were replaced by new 16-inch seven-spoke wheels, with a hubcap designed to look like a centerlock nut. The second facelift was referred to as nuovolook.

== Specifications ==
The cars in the Biturbo family were of unibody steel construction, with a conventional layout of front-longitudinally mounted engine and gearbox. Suspension was of the MacPherson strut type upfront and semi-trailing arms at the rear, with coil springs, double-acting dampers and anti-roll bars on both axles. The differential and rear suspension arms were supported by a subframe.

=== Engines ===
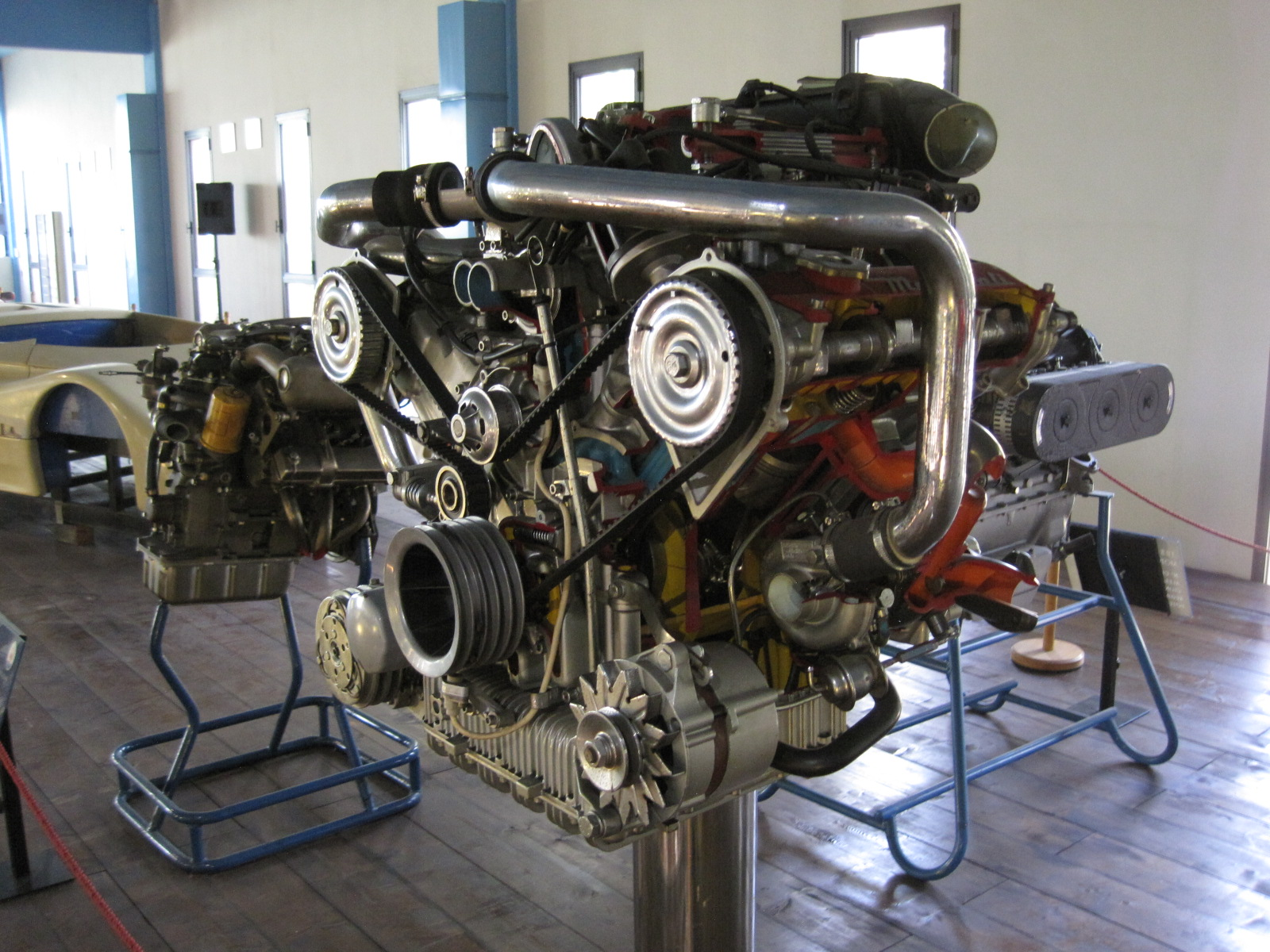
The 18-valve Biturbo V6 engine

The Maserati Biturbo was the first production car to use a twin-turbocharged engine. The all-aluminum 90-degree V6, although a new design, was roughly based on the V6 engine used in the Merak. The engine in the Biturbo uses a timing belt to drive the camshafts, whilst the V6 in the Merak and the Citroën SM uses a timing chain. The 2-litre version of the engine featured wet aluminum sleeves coated with Nikasil. Originally, it featured three valves per cylinder; two for intake and one for exhaust. Later in production, some engines in the lineup received new heads with 4 valves per cylinder.

In Italy, new cars with engine displacement over 2,000 cc were subjected to a 38% value added tax, against 19% on smaller displacement cars. Therefore, throughout the Biturbo's production run, two models were made; the two-litre models aimed mainly at the domestic market and "export" versions, initially with a 2.5 L V6 engine and later, a 2.8 L V6 engine. The carbureted 2.5 L engine was rated at 185 hp (138 kW) and 282 N⋅m (208 lb⋅ft) of torque in North American specification and 192 PS (141 kW) and 298 N⋅m (220 lb⋅ft) of torque in European specification.

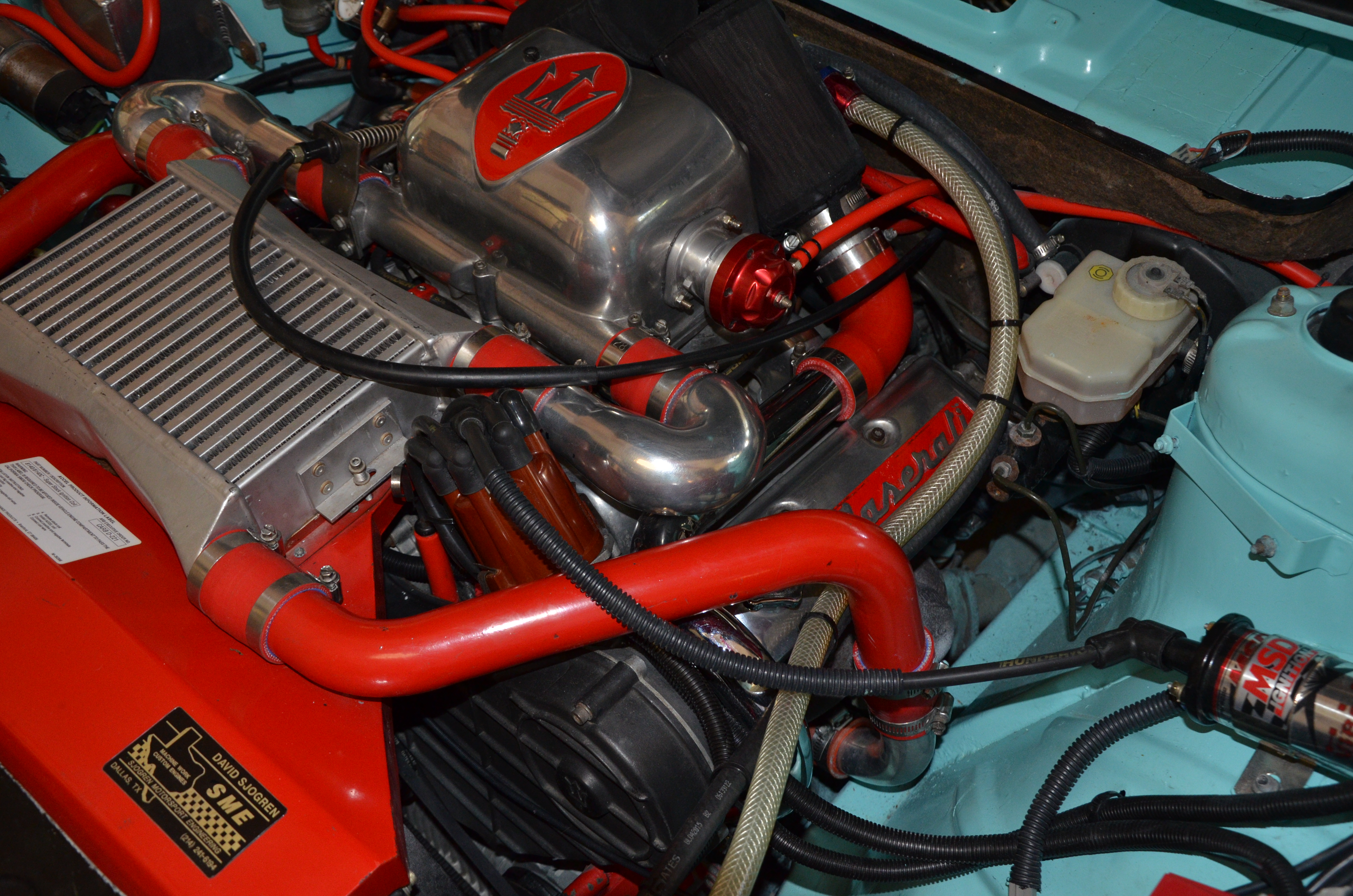
The 2.5 L 18V Engine used in the export market Biturbos

In 1984 and 1985, the 2.5 L V6 models utilised a single Weber DCNVH carburetor under a smooth aluminum alloy plenum fed by twin IHI turbo chargers (one per bank of cylinders). Maserati, U.S. dealers, and sports car enthusiasts began experimenting with intercoolers for which many variants were fitted and mutually endorsed by Maserati. Intercoolers included air-to-air (two variants: top mounted assembly which was not as efficient as the separate side-mounted versions) and water-to-air intercoolers, all produced by Spearco. In 1986, the 2.5 L V6 models switched to a Weber 34DAT carburetor which was proven to be less efficient and more problematic to maintain than the Weber DCNVH used previously. On initial viewing of the 1986 Biturbo engine bay, the aluminum alloy plenum is finned with a slightly different footprint and the intake manifold was specific for that model. Similar experimentation with intercoolers and placement continued through 1986 models. However, the side-mounted water-to-air intercooler became the standard variant utilised until late 1986 or early 1987 when the intercoolers were placed by the Maserati factory, outside the engine bay located in front of the radiator where they remained throughout the remaining models in the Biturbo family tree.

Fuel injection was fitted in 1987 raising power output to 187 hp (139 kW) on North American models.

In 1989 the enlarged 2.8 L engine came with an increased power output of 225 hp (168 kW) and 246 lb⋅ft (334 N⋅m) of torque for North America and 250 PS (184 kW; 247 hp) for Europe.

A 1,996 cc DOHC 36-valve (6 valves per cylinder) V6 engine was developed for the Biturbo but never manufactured.

Engine type	Displacement	Valvetrain	Fuel system	Model(s)
AM 452	2.0 L (1,996 cc); 82 mm (3.23 in) bore 63 mm (2.48 in) stroke	18 valves	Carburetor	Biturbo, Biturbo S
AM 453	2.5 L (2,491 cc); 91.6 mm (3.61 in) bore 63 mm (2.48 in) stroke	18 valves	Carburetor	Biturbo E
AM 470	2.0 L (1,996 cc)	18 valves	Fuel injection	Biturbo i
AM 471	2.0 L (1,996 cc)	18 valves	Fuel injection	Biturbo Si, 222, 4.18v, Spyder
AM 472	2.5 L (2,491 cc)	18 valves	Fuel injection	Biturbo i 2500
AM 473	2.8 L (2,790 cc); 94 mm (3.70 in) bore 67 mm (2.64 in) stroke	18 valves	Fuel injection	228, 430, 222 E, Spyder 2800, Karif
AM 475	2.0 L (1,996 cc)	24 valves	Fuel injection	2.24v, 4.24v, Spyder III 2.0
AM 477	2.8 L (2,790 cc)	24 valves	Fuel injection	222 4v, 430 4v
AM 490	2.0 L (1,996 cc)	24 valves	Fuel injection	Racing, Barchetta Stradale

== Biturbo coupé (Tipo AM331) ==
=== Biturbo ===
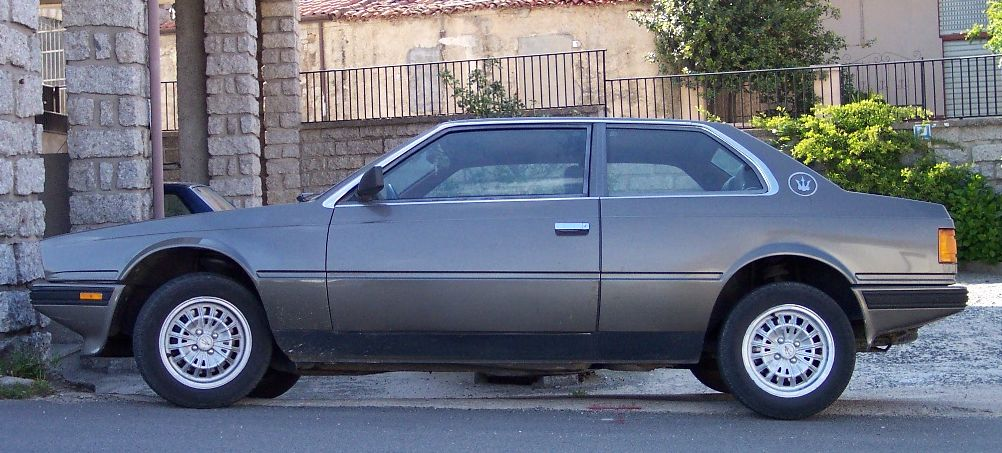
An early Biturbo, showing the first design of alloy wheels.

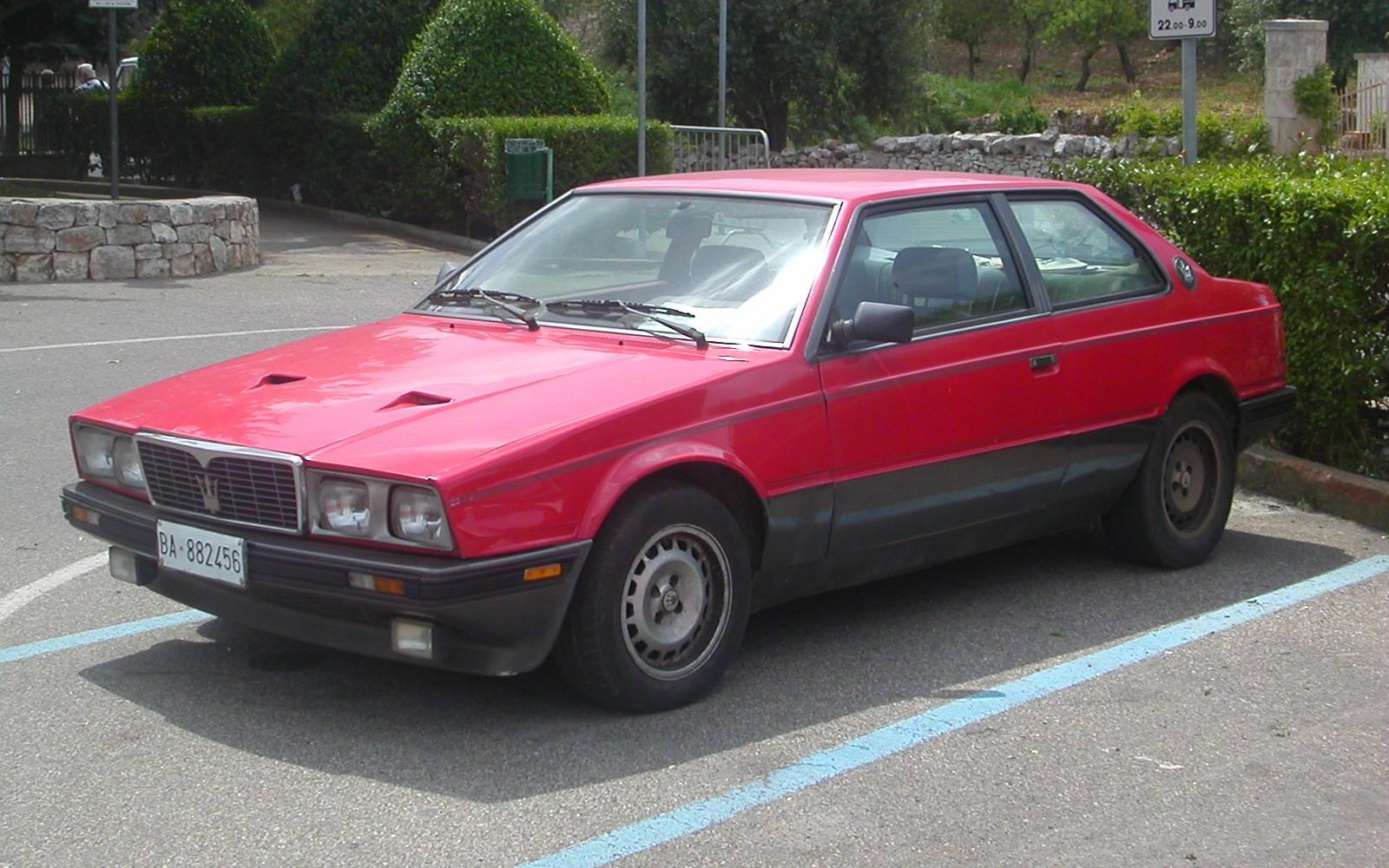
Maserati Biturbo S

The Biturbo is a two-door 2+2 coupé, introduced in December 1981. It is powered by a twin-turbocharged V6, rated at 180–205 PS (132–151 kW). The Biturbo name was dropped when the car was significantly redesigned in 1988. After 1994, the two-door coupé was again significantly reworked and became the Ghibli.

In July 1983, Maserati launched the sporty Biturbo S, for the Italian market only. Power was increased by 25 PS (18 kW) to 205 PS (151 kW) at 6,500 rpm, courtesy of increased turbo boost and twin intercoolers which fed fresh air by two NACA ducts in the bonnet. The chassis was updated as well with lowered suspension and new, wider 6½Jx14" magnesium alloy wheels were fitted. The S was recognizable by its black mesh grille and the external trim (grille frame, headlight housings, window surround and Maserati badges on the C-pillar) finished in a dark bronze shade instead of chrome. The customer could only choose between two paint schemes: silver or red, both paired to the lower half of the body in contrasting metallic gunmetal grey. In the same year, the 2.5-litre Biturbo 2500 or Biturbo E (for Export) was also introduced, and was joined some twelve months later by the Biturbo ES with power outputs 205 or 196 PS (151 or 144 kW), respectively in European- or catalysed US-specification. In 1985, all models received updates and were renamed Biturbo II, Biturbo S II and Biturbo E II. The cylinders were now Nikasil-coated, a more capacious fuel tank was fitted and a Sensitork limited-slip differential replaced the earlier Salisbury clutch-type. The second series of the Biturbo was recognizable by its new 6"Jx14" wheels similar in design to the Biturbo S wheels; the S II wheels had fully painted faces, without the silver center.

1986 brought a major change: carburation gave way to Weber-Marelli fuel injection, and the Italian market models were now known as the Biturbo i and Biturbo Si. Power outputs increased across the range, albeit at some loss of throttle response. The original square instrument cluster (from 1983 - 1985) was changed in 1986 in favour of a rounded shape instrument cluster. The intercoolers were moved from under the bonnet to a front-mounted position directly behind the grille, making the NACA ducts on the Si's bonnet merely decorative.

In 1986, a special edition of the Si called the Biturbo Si Black was introduced, whose main feature was a black on metallic grey paint scheme.105 units were made until 1988. Performance was the same as for the regular Si. In 1987, Maserati launched the final car to wear the Biturbo badge, the U.S only 2.5 litre export market model Biturbo (E) Si Black. with black on metallic grey paint scheme and special interior trim. Only a total of 25 cars were known to have been produced for the U.S. market.

=== 222 ===
In May 1988, with the models receiving a facelift, the Biturbo name was dropped in favour of 222—meaning two-door, two-litre engine and second generation. The car carried all the visual clues of Gandini's signature design language, with a more rounded grille and bonnet as on the 430, different wing mirrors and a rear spoiler. The 222 premiered at the 1988 Turin Auto Show. The engine size of the 222 E export model grew from the Biturbo's 2.5-litre to 2.8-litres. A mixed velour-leather interior was standard on the domestic models, while export markets got leather upholstery as standard.

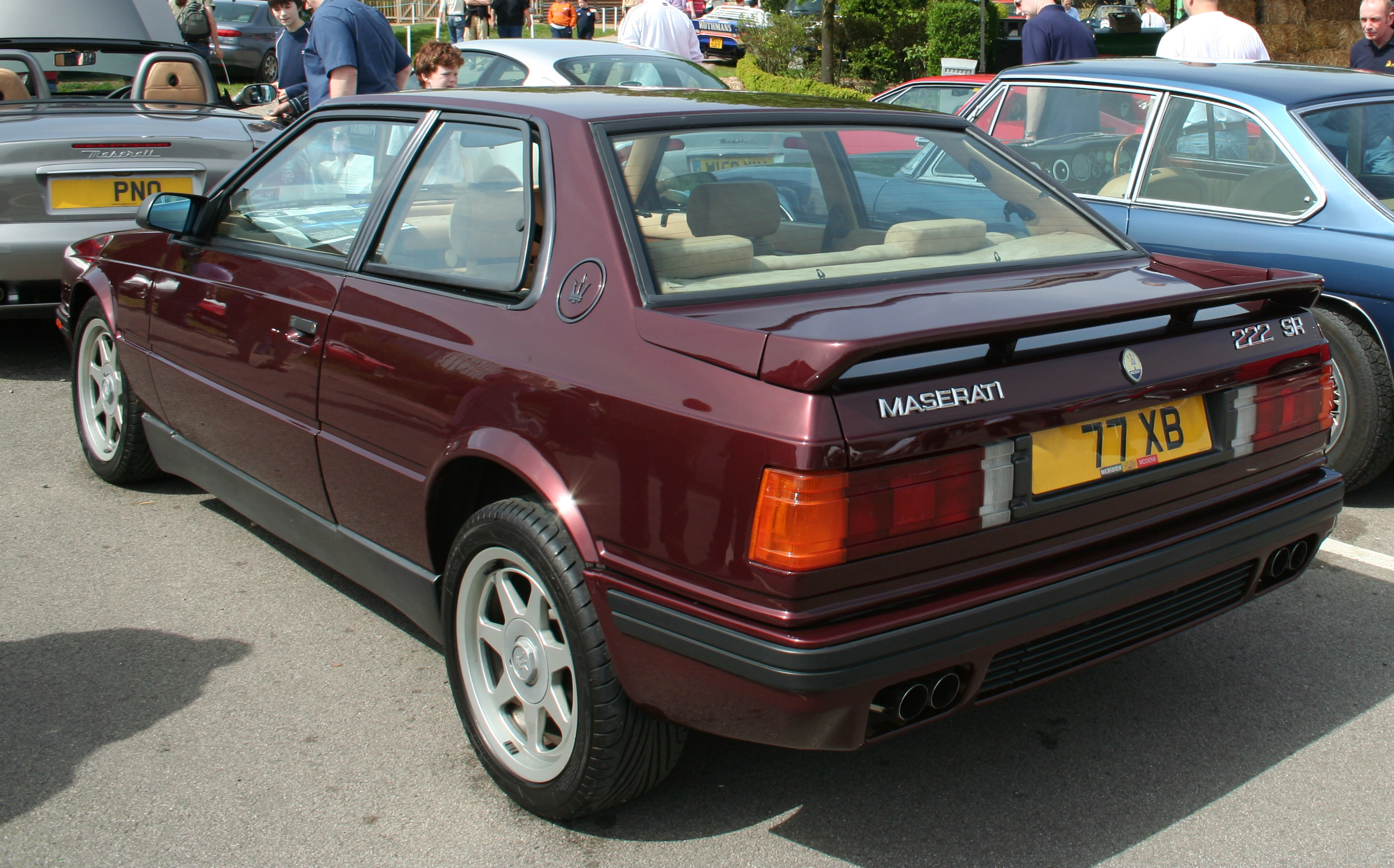
1994 Maserati 222 SR

1990 saw the arrival of the 2.8 L 222 SE, heir to the Biturbo ES. It inherited the latter's limited paint finish availability (red, silver or black) and the dark trim and grille, while modern aprons and side skirts (blacked out as well) came from the 2.24v.

After just a year, the 222 SE was replaced by the restyled 222 SR; the SR offered adaptive suspension as an option. Simultaneously the very similar 222 4v. joined the lineup; it was a 222 SR with a 2.8 L four-valve engine, the first car to incorporate a DOHC engine in the direct Biturbo E lineage. It featured wider, 16-inch, 7-spoke alloy wheels.

=== 2.24v ===
In December 1988 Maserati unveiled the most powerful variant of the two-litre models: the 2.24v, powered by the new four-valve per cylinder engine. The engine itself had been displayed at the Turin Auto Show in May 1988. The 2.24v was the first model to use the more modern wraparound front and rear fascias with integrated foglights, and deep side skirts. It was also distinguished by the 15-inch disc shaped alloy wheels as also used on the 422 and 430, a black grille and trim treatment, rear deck spoiler and lower body two-tone paint. The bonnet was adorned by two reversed NACA ducts to extract hot air from the engine bay, as on the Karif, while at the rear there were four exhaust tips. It went on sale in early 1989 in Italy, the model's most important market. The 2.24v replaced the earlier Biturbo Si, which was taken out of production in the latter half of 1988.

In 1991 Gandini's restyling transformed the 2.24v into the 2.24v II. The new series cars were fitted with a catalytic converter, and got Meccanica Attiva suspension on all four wheels as standard. Production of the 2.24v ceased in 1993.

=== Racing ===
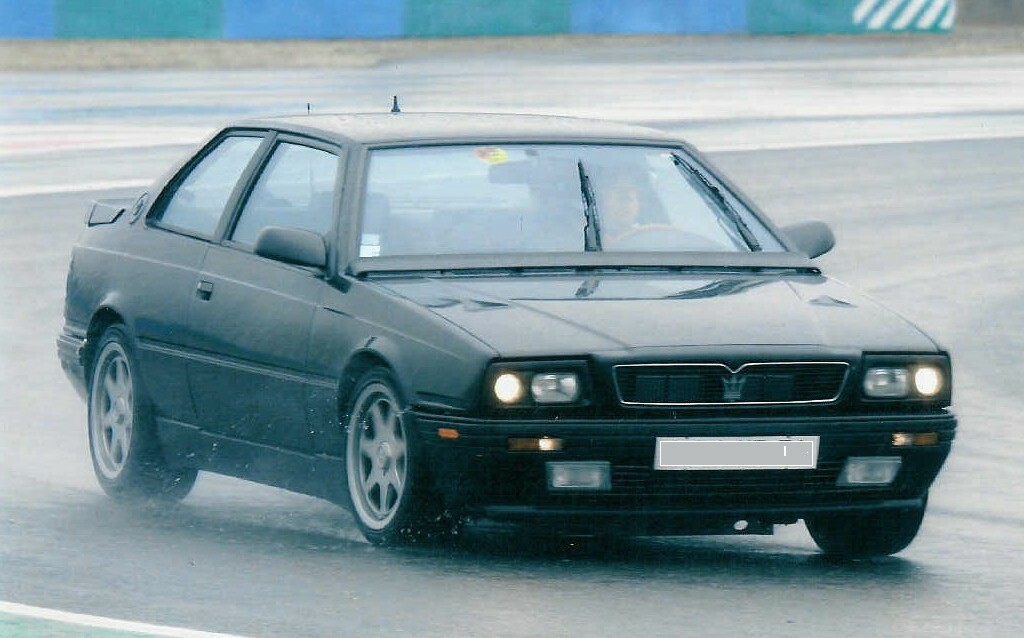
A 1991 Racing at Magny-Cours

The Maserati Racing (Tipo 331) was a more potent variant of the 2.24v with a higher power output, and was meant as an intermediate model beneath the more aggressive Shamal. The redesigned front end and other elements also found their way onto the remainder of the Biturbo range. It was first introduced to the press in December 1990. Only 230 units were built from 1991 to 1992 and were mainly intended for the Italian market. 173 Maserati Racing were delivered new to Italy, with the remainder presumable exported. Several units have also been exported from Italy since, to other European nations; limited documentation was available, which made homologation in some countries a huge administrative challenge.

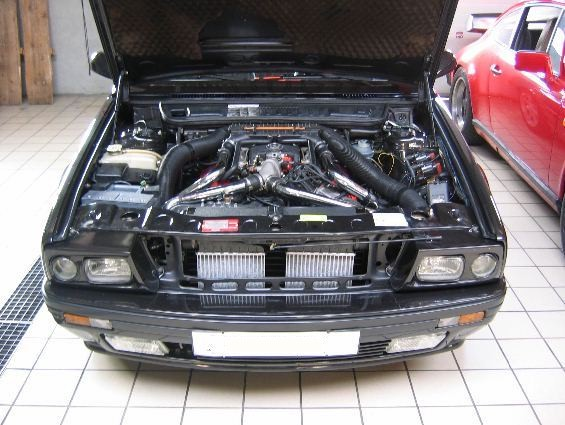
Engine

The lowered, electronic KONI shock absorbers allowed to adjust damping on four settings, allowing for comfort or sharp handling at the flick of a switch. This is combined with a five-speed manual gearbox manufactured by Getrag and a limited-slip differential from Maserati but suspected to use Quaife technology.

The choice of colours of the Racing was limited to red or black. On the interior, the only change was the paneling, painted dark grey (carbon fibre grey) instead of the standardwood trim.

Combined with new settings on the two engine controllers from Magneti Marelli, in charge of the ignition, the fuel injection and the turbo boost management, allowed the power to increase to 285 PS (210 kW; 281 hp) at 6,250 rpm with a specific output of 142.5 PS/L. The torque is 374 N⋅m (276 lb⋅ft) at 4,250 rpm. This engine was given the designation AM 490 in the Maserati engine reference book. The engine was made compatible with lead-free gasoline. Induction consists of two IHI water-cooled turbochargers with two air-to-air intercoolers. Changes from the 2.24v's engine include a new, lighter crankshaft, new exhaust valves (sodium filled for improved heat dissipation), new combustion chambers, new lighter connecting rods, new lighter forged aluminium pistons, and new IHI turbochargers.

Performance stats

- Max. speed: 256 km/h (159 mph)
- 0–100 km/h (0–62 mph): 5.9 seconds.
- 0–1,000 m (0.00–0.62 mi): 25.60 seconds.

=== Versions and engines ===
Model	Years	Engine		Power	Fuel system	Notes	Units produced
Biturbo	1981–85	1996 cc	V6 SOHC	180 PS (132 kW; 178 hp)	Carburetor	Italy only	9,206
Biturbo E	1983–85	2491 cc	V6 SOHC	185 PS (136 kW; 182 hp)	Carburetor		4,577
Biturbo S	1983–86	1996 cc	V6 SOHC	205 PS (151 kW; 202 hp)	Carburetor	Italy/France	1,038
Biturbo ES	1984–85	2491 cc	V6 SOHC	205 PS (151 kW; 202 hp)	Carburetor		1,480
Biturbo II	1985–87	1996 cc	V6 SOHC	180 PS (132 kW; 178 hp)	Carburetor	Italy only	(combined with Biturbo)
Biturbo S 2.5	1984–88	2491 cc	V6 SOHC	196 PS (144 kW; 193 hp)	Carburetor	Catalysator	(combined with Biturbo ES)
Biturbo E II 2.5	1985–87	2491 cc	V6 SOHC	185 PS (136 kW; 182 hp)	Carburetor	Catalysator	(combined with Biturbo E)
Biturbo S II	1985–86	1996 cc	V6 SOHC	210 PS (154 kW; 207 hp)	Carburetor	Italy only	(combined with Biturbo S)
Biturbo i	1986–90	1996 cc	V6 SOHC	188 PS (138 kW; 185 hp)	Fuel injection	Italy only	683
Biturbo Si	1986–88	1996 cc	V6 SOHC	220 PS (162 kW; 217 hp)	Fuel injection	Italy only	992
Biturbo Si Black	1986–88	1996 cc	V6 SOHC	220 PS (162 kW; 217 hp)	Fuel injection	Italy only	450
Biturbo Si 2.5	1987–91	2491 cc	V6 SOHC	188 PS (138 kW; 185 hp)	Fuel injection	Catalysator	430
2.24v	1988–92	1996 cc	V6 DOHC	245 PS (180 kW; 242 hp)	Fuel injection	Italy only	1,147
4.24v	1990-92	1996 cc	V6 DOHC	245 PS (180 kW; 242 hp)	Fuel injection	Italy only	384
222	1988–90	1996 cc	V6 SOHC	220 PS (162 kW; 217 hp)	Fuel injection	Catalysator, Italy only	1,156
222 E	1988–90	2790 cc	V6 SOHC	250 PS (184 kW; 247 hp)	Fuel injection		722
222 E	1988–93	2790 cc	V6 SOHC	225 PS (165 kW; 222 hp)	Fuel injection	Catalysator	722
222 SE	1990–91	2790 cc	V6 SOHC	250 PS (184 kW; 247 hp)	Fuel injection		210
222 SE	1990–91	2790 cc	V6 SOHC	225 PS (165 kW; 222 hp)	Fuel injection	Catalytic converter (US: 225 hp)	210
2.24v II	1991–93	1996 cc	V6 DOHC	240 PS (177 kW; 237 hp)	Fuel injection	Catalysator, Italy only	254
4.24v II	1992-93	1996 cc	V6 DOHC	240 PS (177 kW; 237 hp)	Fuel injection	Catalysator, Italy only	490
222 SR	1991–93	2790 cc	V6 SOHC	225 PS (165 kW; 222 hp)	Fuel injection	Catalysator	(combined with 222 SE)
222 4v	1991–94	2790 cc	V6 DOHC	279 PS (205 kW; 275 hp)	Fuel injection	Catalysator	130
Racing	1991–92	1996 cc	V6 DOHC	285 PS (210 kW; 281 hp)	Fuel injection		230

== Biturbo saloon (Tipo AM332) ==
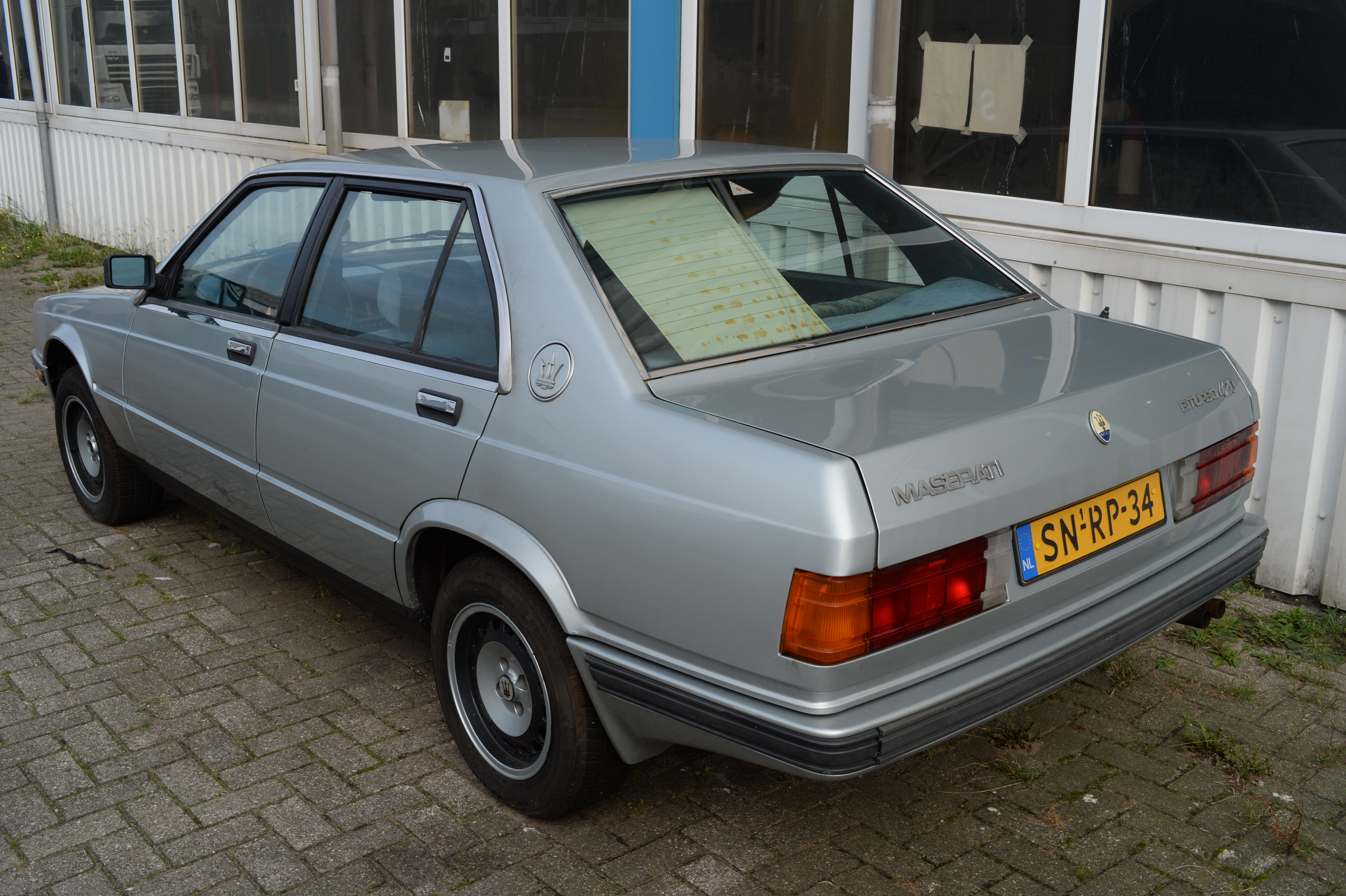
Rear view of a Biturbo 420 saloon

Two years after the Biturbo's introduction a four-door version was unveiled. In comparison to the coupé, the saloon sat on an 8.6 cm (3 in) longer wheelbase and had a more pronounced rear overhang. While keeping a resemblance with the rest of lineup, only the nose and bonnet were shared between the equivalent two and four-door models; all the bodywork from the A-pillar to the rear is specific to the saloons. Due to the longer wheelbase and added luxury components, the weight increased by 100 kg (220 lb). Most of the four-door Biturbos have slightly less power output than their two-door counterparts, due to the different routing of the exhaust system.

=== 420 and 425 ===
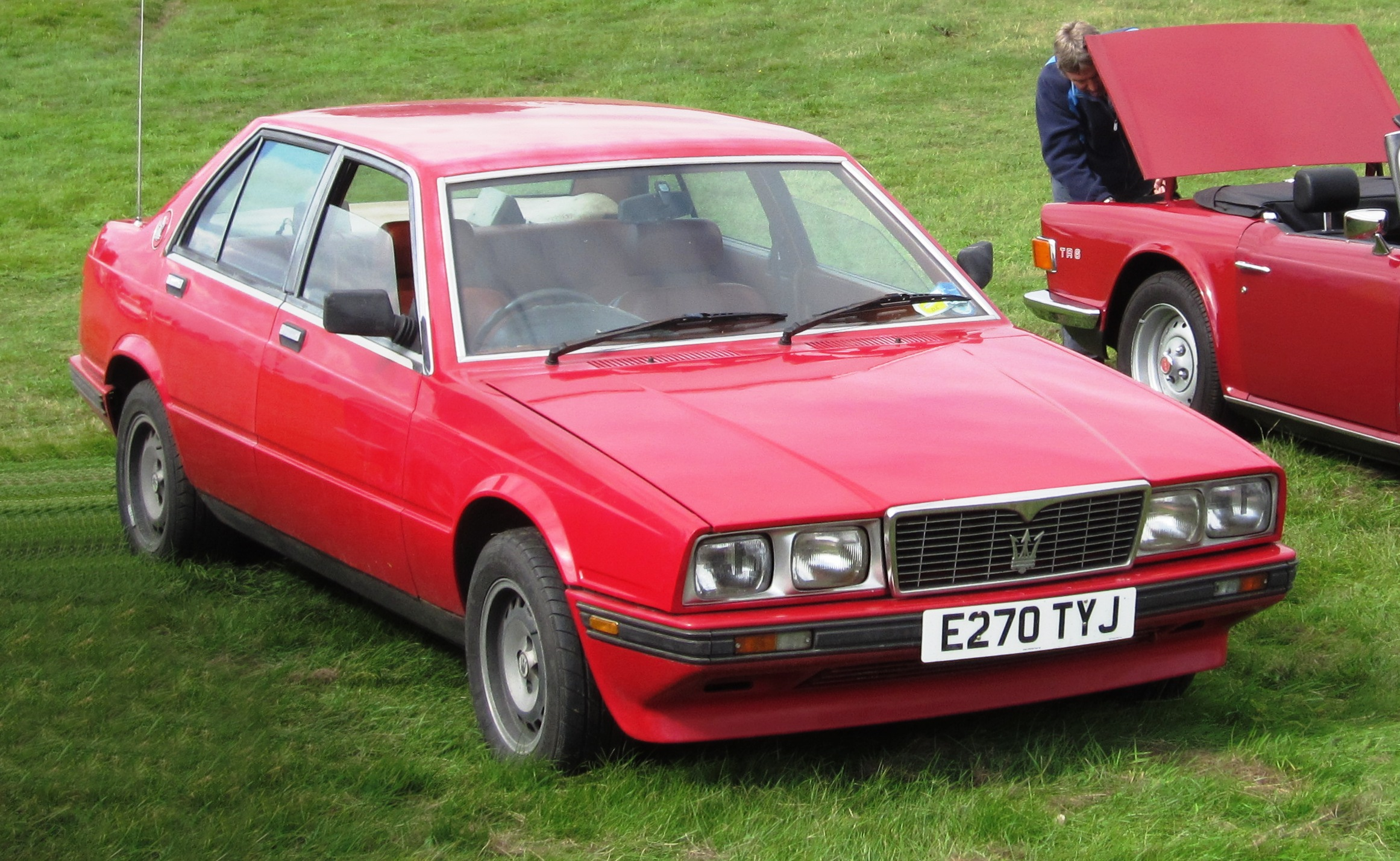
Maserati 425

The first four-door Biturbo introduced was the 425 (1983–86), equipped with the "export" 2.5 litre engine. In 1984, the 425 (along with the two-door models) received a new dashboard. Two years later, a two-litre version of the 425, the 420 (1985–86), was added for the domestic market, together with the more powerful 420 S. The 420 S sported improved handling, the twin intercooled engine and the same aesthetic accoutrements of the Biturbo S: dark finish trim, two-tone paint, two-tone wheels and NACA ducts on the bonnet, delivering fresh air to the intercoolers. Like their two-door siblings in 1986, the saloons were updated with the Weber fuel injection, thus spawning the 425 i (1986–89), 420 i (1985–87) and 420 Si (1985–87). The latter featured a somewhat more restrained styling than its predecessor.

=== 430 ===
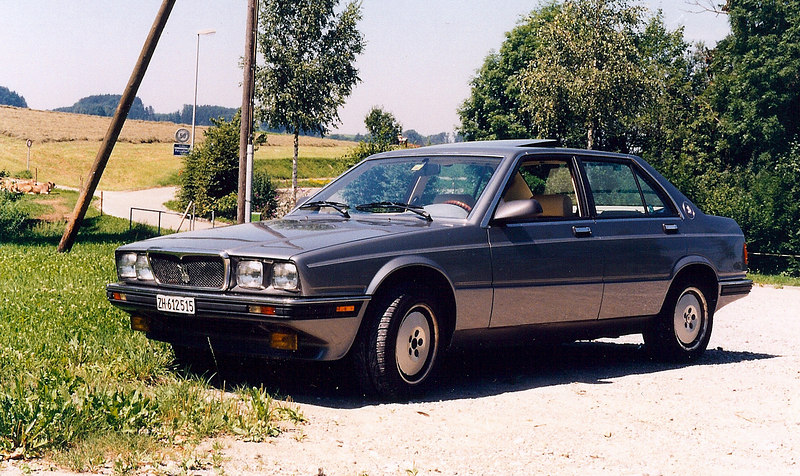
1989 Maserati 430

In 1986, Maserati launched the high-performance version of the Biturbo saloon called the 430 which was produced from 1986 to 1994. It was the flagship variant of the saloon range, which debuted the largest 2.8-litre version of the Biturbo engine.

The 430 was distinguished by 15-inch 5-lug disc alloy wheels and a more rounded grille and hood, that later found their way to the rest of the lineup with the first 1988 facelift. The 430 was considered to be a full grand tourer, with standard leather upholstery and walnut veneered steering wheel rim, dashboard trim, door inserts, gear shift knob along with the handbrake lever.

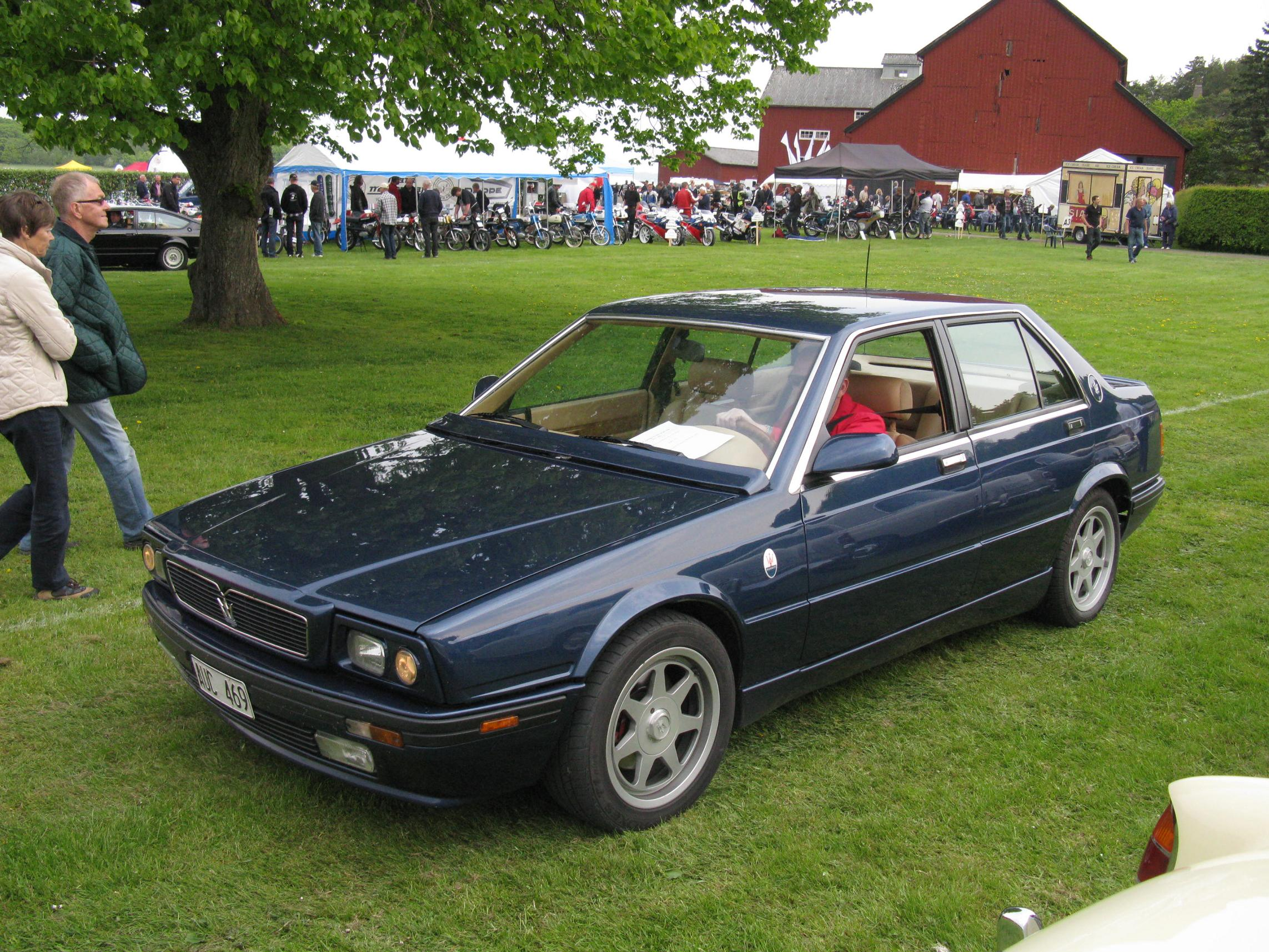
1994 Maserati 430

1991 saw the introduction of the restyled 430 4v (1991–1994), powered by the latest 24-valve engine – as the "4v" suffix implied. As the top of the range 2.8 L saloon, the 430 received the full aerodynamic package, including a discreet spoiler on the trailing edge of the bootlid. The regular 430 variant was updated as well (gaining new bumpers) and remained on sale alongside its four-valve counterpart. In total, 955 cars were made.

=== 422 ===
As the Biturbo was replaced by the 222, the 420s gave way to the 422 produced from 1988 to 1992. The 422 was basically a 420 Si with the 1988 restyled grille, wing mirrors and wheels.

=== 4.24v ===
The 4.24v was the four-door offering of the 2.24v. This new subfamily of the Biturbos paired Maserati's four-valve 2.0 L V6 with the new Meccanica Attiva suspension. The 4.24v also adopted all of the exterior trappings of the 2.24v, including black trim and grille, black deep side skirts and a small spoiler on the boot. In 1991, the 4.24v was subjected to the restyling alongside the rest of the range, becoming the 4.24v II. Catalytic converters meant power decreased somewhat in comparison with the previous model.

=== 4.18v ===
The 4.18v was launched in December 1990 and was meant for the Italian market only. It was very similar to the 422, but utilised an engine with three-valve per cylinder heads. It was the first Biturbo to feature ABS as standard. With 77 examples made, it is the rarest in the entire Biturbo family.

=== Versions and engines ===
Model	Years	Engine	Displacement	Power	Fuel system	Notes	Units produced
425	1983–89	V6 SOHC	2.5 L (2,491 cc)	200 PS (147 kW; 197 hp)	Carburetor		2,052
425i	1987–89	V6 SOHC	2.5 L (2,491 cc)	188 PS (138 kW; 185 hp)	Fuel injection	Catalysator	320
420	1985–86	V6 SOHC	2.0 L (1,996 cc)	180 PS (132 kW; 178 hp)	Carburetor	Italy only	2,810
420i	1986–88	V6 SOHC	2.0 L (1,996 cc)	185 PS (136 kW; 182 hp)	Fuel injection		1,124
420 S	1985–87	V6 SOHC	2.0 L (1,996 cc)	205 PS (151 kW; 202 hp)	Carburetor	Italy only	254
420 Si	1986–88	V6 SOHC	2.0 L (1,996 cc)	210 PS (154 kW; 207 hp)	Fuel injection		524
430	1987–94	V6 SOHC	2.8 L (2,790 cc)	225 PS (165 kW; 222 hp)	Fuel injection	Catalysator	995
422	1988–92	V6 SOHC	2.0 L (1,997 cc)	220 PS (162 kW; 217 hp)	Fuel injection	Catalysator	978
4.18v	1990–92	V6 SOHC	2.0 L (1,996 cc)	220 PS (162 kW; 217 hp)	Fuel injection	Catalysator	77
4.24v	1990–92	V6 DOHC	2.0 L (1,996 cc)	245 PS (180 kW; 242 hp)	Fuel injection	Italy only	384
4.24v II	1991–93	V6 DOHC	2.0 L (1,996 cc)	240 PS (177 kW; 237 hp)	Fuel injection	Catalysator	490
430 4v	1991–93	V6 DOHC	2.8 L (2,790 cc)	280 PS (206 kW; 276 hp)	Fuel injection	Catalysator	291

== Biturbo spyder (Tipo AM333) ==
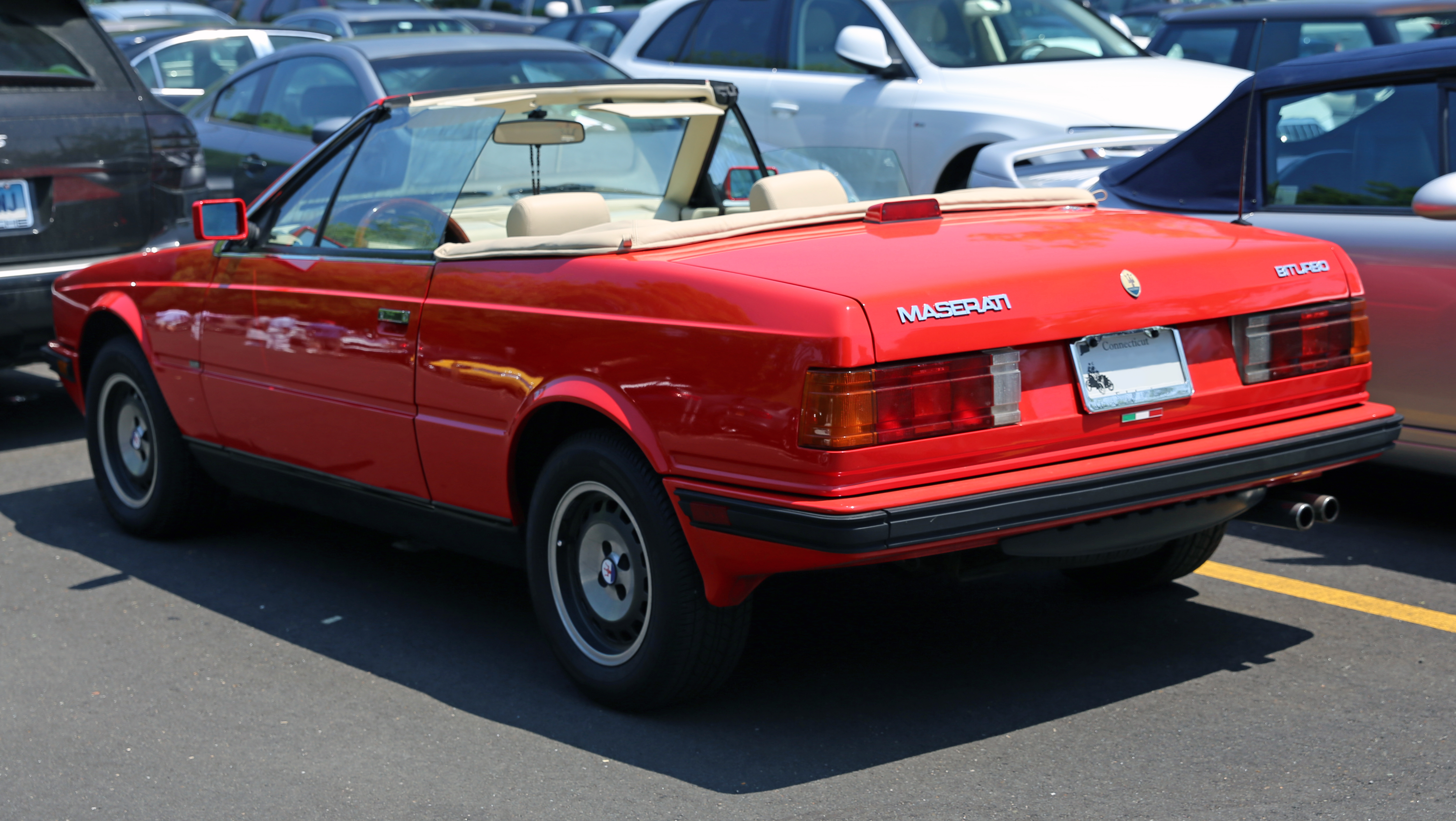
1987 US-specification Spyder

The convertible iteration of the Biturbo was designed by Giuseppe Mittino and assembled by Zagato in Milan. It was Zagato's first work for Maserati since the A6G/2000 30 years earlier. Embo of Caramagna was first commissioned to develop a four-seater cabriolet version of the Biturbo, which was shown at the April 1982 Turin Auto Show, but their proposal never made it to production.

The Spyder was built on a 2,400 mm (94.5 in) wheelbase, some 114 mm (4.5 in) shorter than the coupé's. Still, since it is a strict two-seater with folding rear seats, the luggage space was larger than in the original Biturbo. It was on this short chassis that the sporty hardtop Karif was later developed. Overall, 3,076 Spyders were built over a ten-year period. This was a production record for open-topped Maseratis.

The first Spyder was launched at the Turin Motor Show in 1984. It was offered with both the 2.0-litre and 2.5-litre "export" engine. Two years later, fuel injection was implemented and the car was now called the Spyder i. 297 were made with the 2.0 L engine and 122 with the 2.5 L engine.

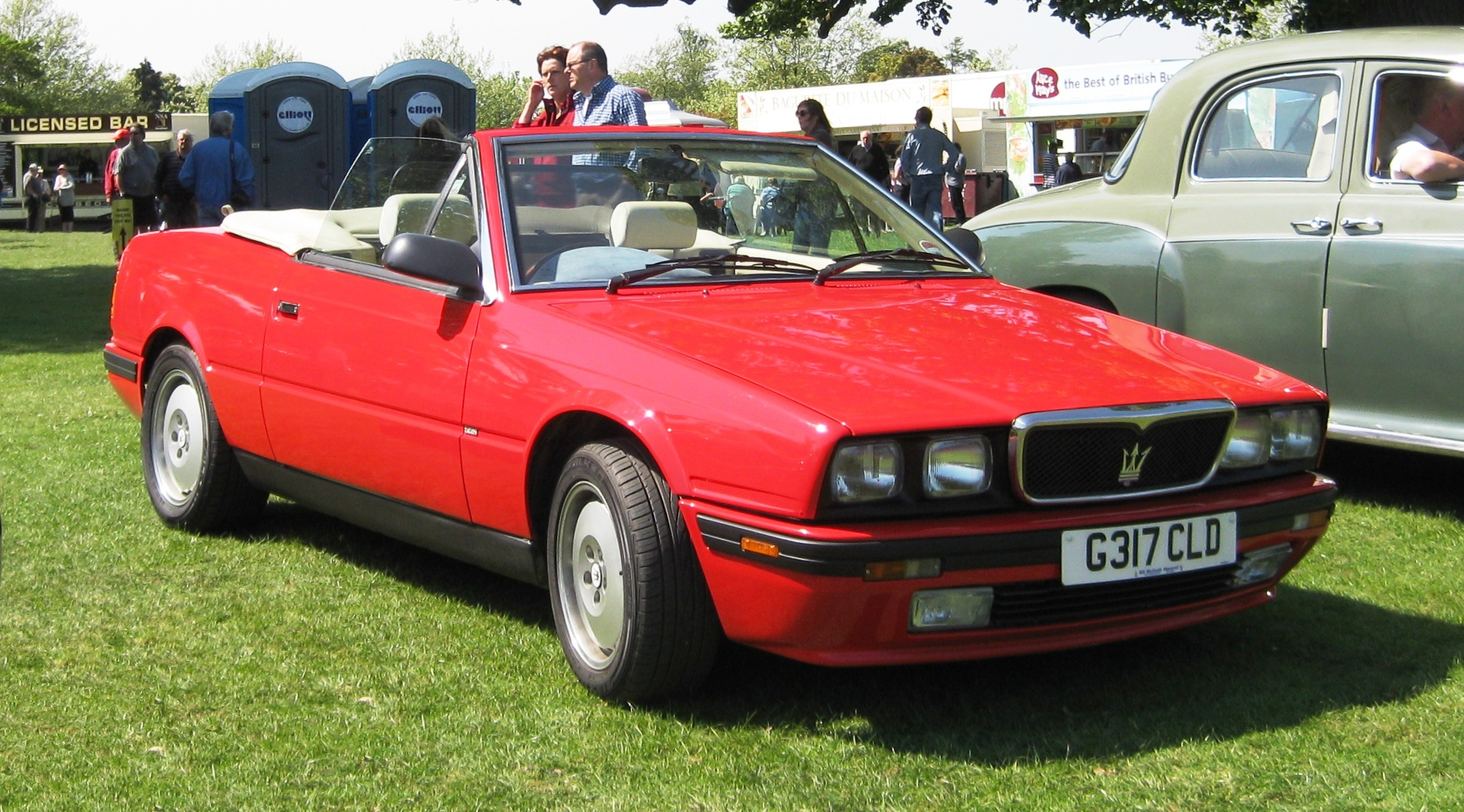
Maserati Spyder i '90

In 1989, the Spyder received a facelift, known as Spyder i 1990 (or '90). The car received the full 1988 Gandini treatment, one year after the other models: rounded grille, fuller bumpers, aerodynamic wing mirrors and 15" wheels on five-lug hubs. As on the rest of the Biturbos, the export engine had the increased displacement of 2.8-litres. A four-speed automatic transmission was available on request. As for the saloons, all engines benefitted from water-cooled turbochargers and intercoolers, increasing reliability considerably over the earlier models.

The third series, or Spyder III, was introduced in 1991 in occasion of Gandini's second facelift that renewed the entire range. This included the new bonnet and grille, ellypsoidal headlights in body-colour housings, a spoiler at the base of the windscreen, deeper body-colour sills and 16-inch seven-spoke wheels. The Spyder IIIs were fitted with Maserati's Ranger limited-slip differential. Whereas the 2.0 L third series Spyder received 24-valve engines, 2.8 L cars still used 18-valves, thus remaining the only 2.8 L Biturbo model to never get a four-valve head upgrade.

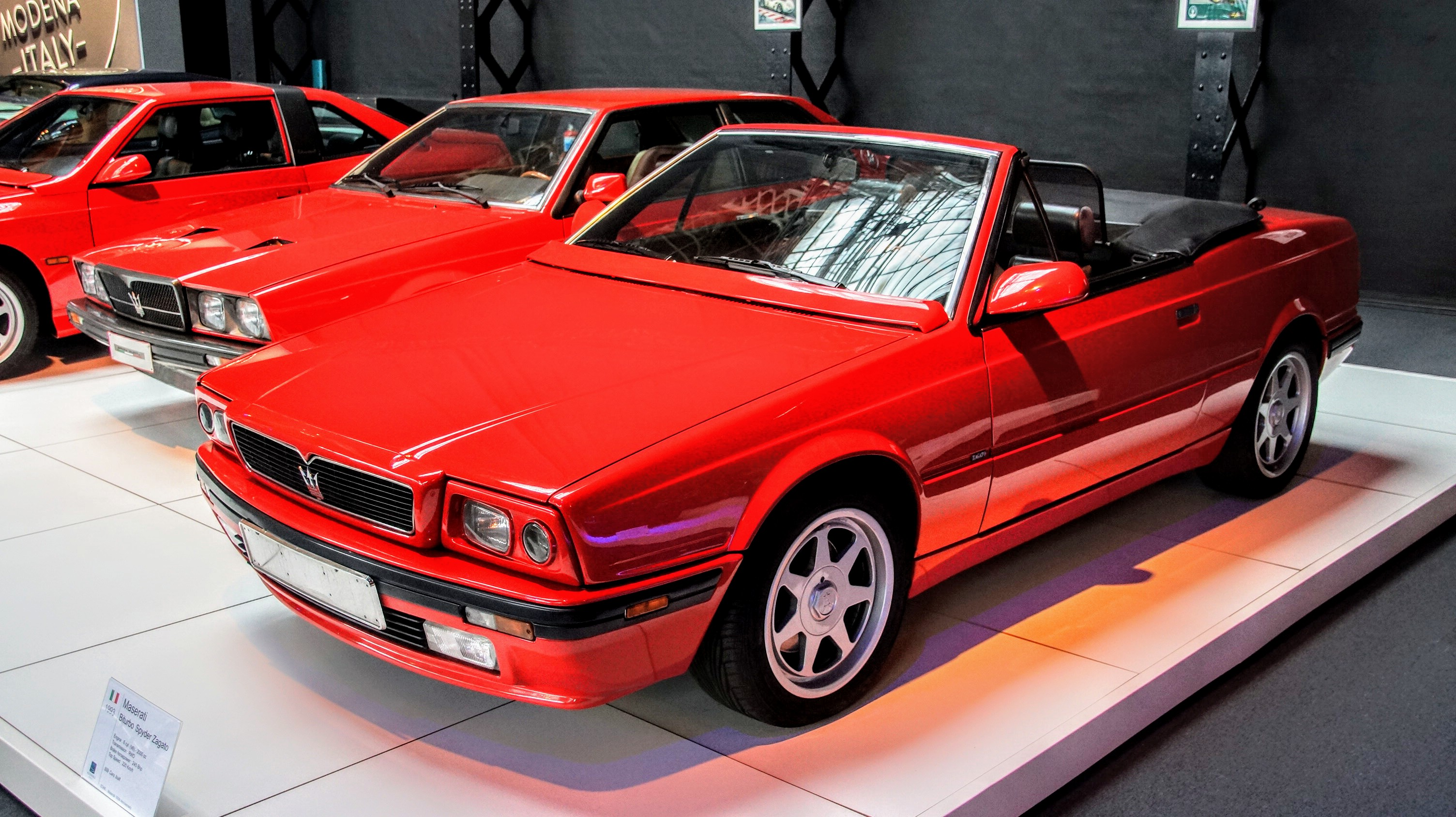
Maserati Spyder III

=== Versions and engines ===
Model	Years	Engine	Displacement	Power	Fuel system	Notes	Units produced
Spyder	1984–88	V6 SOHC	1996 cc	180 hp (134 kW)	Carburetor	Italy only	276
Spyder 2500	1984–88	V6 SOHC	2491 cc	192 hp (143 kW)	Carburetor	Catalysator	1,049
Spyder i	1986–88	V6 SOHC	1996 cc	185 hp (138 kW)	Fuel injection		297
Spyder i 2500	1988–89	V6 SOHC	2491 cc	188 hp (140 kW)	Fuel injection	Catalysator	122
Spyder i 1990	1989–91	V6 SOHC	1996 cc	220 hp (164 kW)	Fuel injection	Catalysator, Italy only	309
Spyder i 1990	1989–91	V6 SOHC	2790 cc	250 hp (186 kW)	Fuel injection		603
Spyder i 1990	1989–91	V6 SOHC	2790 cc	225 hp (168 kW)	Fuel injection	Catalysator	603
Spyder III	1991–94	V6 DOHC	1996 cc	245 hp (183 kW)	Fuel injection	Italy only	200
Spyder III	1991–94	V6 DOHC	1996 cc	240 hp (179 kW)	Fuel injection	Catalysator, Italy only	200
Spyder III 2800	1991–94	V6 SOHC	2790 cc	225 hp (168 kW)	Fuel injection	Catalysator	220

== Maserati 228 (Tipo AM334) ==
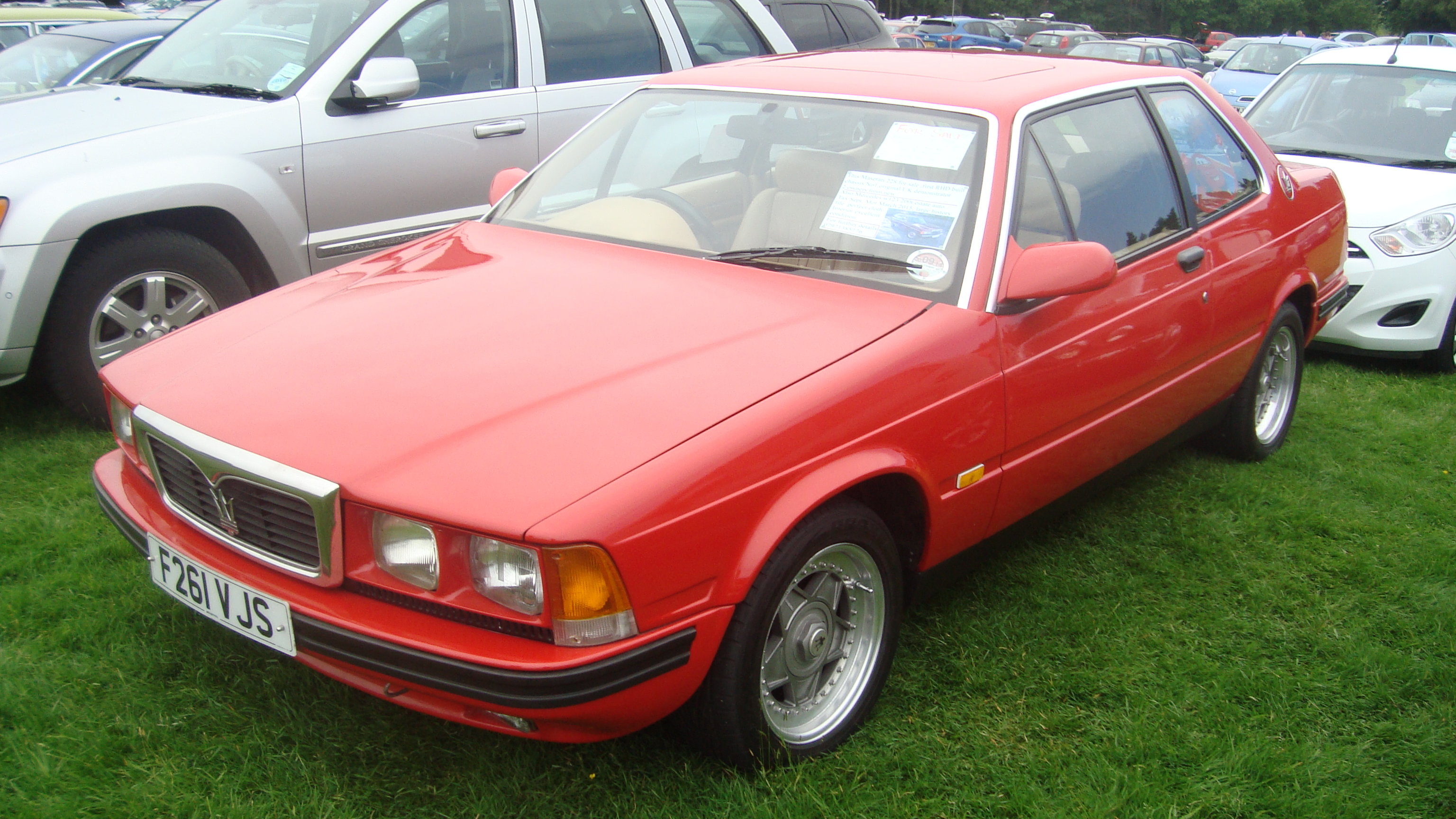
Maserati 228

The Maserati 228 was a two-door, 5-seater GT coupé based on the Biturbo chassis. It was conceived to be a more luxurious offering than that earlier of the Biturbo lineup, and was therefore aimed at the same market of the large GTs of the past like the 3500 GT and Mexico. To accomplish this, it was based on the longer 2,600 mm (102.4 in) wheelbase chassis of the four-door Biturbos, and powered by the largest 2.8 litre 18-valve fuel injected V6 (hence the name 228 – 2-door, 2.8 L engine). Bilstein gas shock absorbers replaced the usual hydraulic ones, and a 4-speed automatic transmission was available on order.

The notchback coupé bodywork was styled by Pierangelo Andreani, and the car was wider and longer than the two-door Biturbos; the interior was also more luxuriously appointed. While it looks similar, the 228 and the Biturbo share no common body panels. Maserati declared the car in the European-specification could accelerate to 100 km/h (62 mph) in 5.6 seconds and attain a top speed of 235 km/h (146 mph).

A 24-valve but still carbureted prototype was shown in December 1984; the production version of the 228 was introduced at the 1986 Turin Motor Show, and 469 examples were made until 1992. Exterior design was done in 1982 by Pierangelo Andreani.

=== Versions and engines ===
Model	Years	Engine	Displacement	Power	Fuel system	Notes	Units produced
228	1986–92	V6 OHC	2,790 cc	250 PS (184 kW)	Fuel injection		469
228	1986–92	V6 OHC	2,790 cc	225 PS (165 kW)	Fuel injection	Catalysator	469
