= Maserati Barchetta =

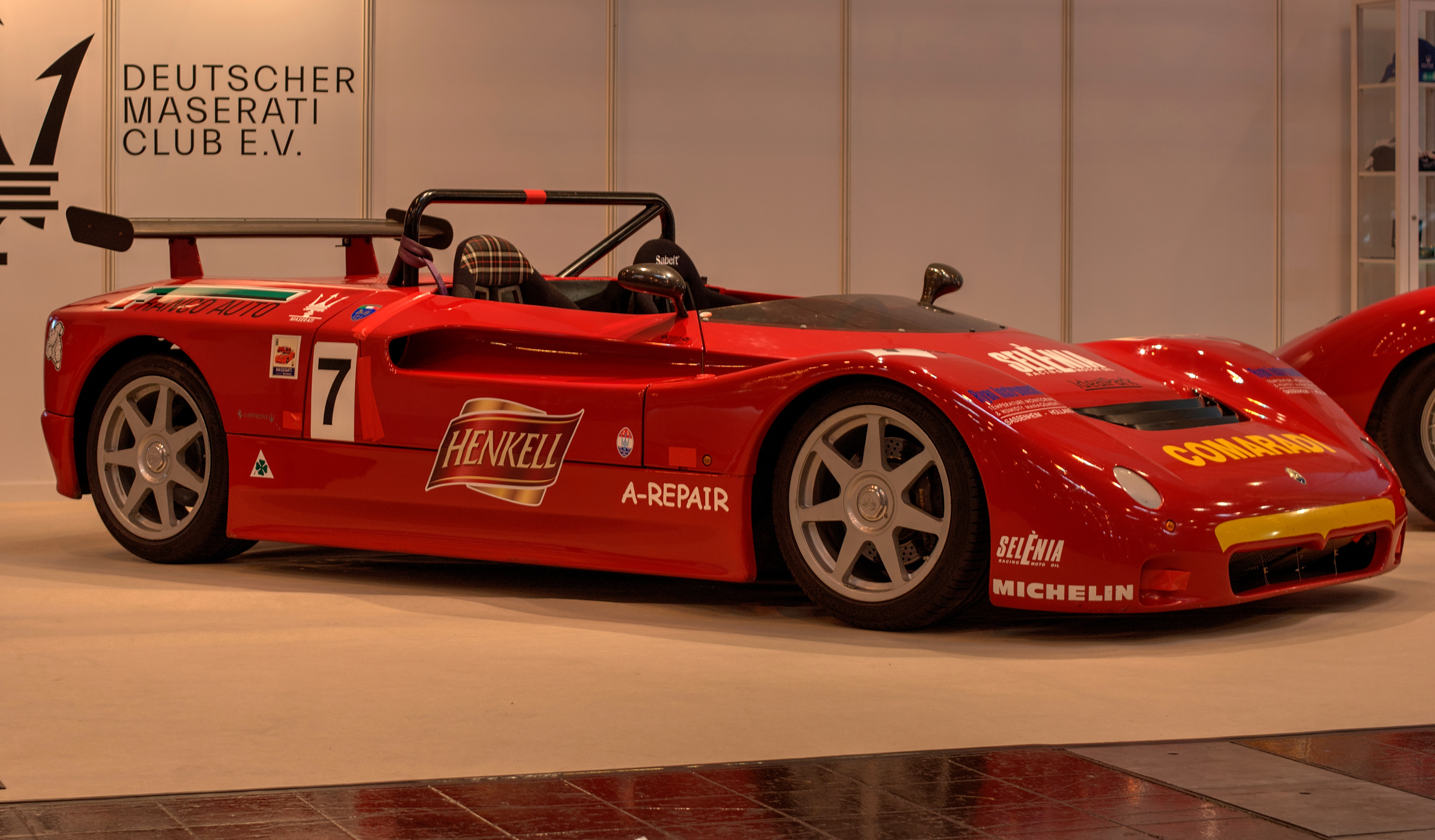

Overview
- Manufacturer: Maserati
- Also called: Barchetta Corsa (racing); Barchetta Stradale (road) one unit only
- Production: 1991–1992 (17 units produced)
- Designer: Carlo Gaino at Synthesis Design

Body and chassis
- Class: Racing car
- Body style: 2-door speedster
- Layout: Rear mid-engine, rear-wheel-drive
- Related: De Tomaso Guarà; Maserati Biturbo

Powertrain
- Engine: 2.0 L (1,996 cc) 90°, 24-valve twin-turbocharged AM501 V6
- Transmission: 6-speed ZF manual

Dimensions
- Wheelbase: 2,600 mm (100 in)
- Length: 4,050 mm (159 in)
- Width: 1,965 mm (77.4 in)
- Height: 930 mm (37 in)
- Curb weight: 775 kg (1,709 lb)

The Maserati Barchetta is a mid-engine racing car, like the 350 and 450S, that was designed by Carlo Gaino of Synthesis Design, an Italian design house.

The Barchetta was designed and developed for the one-make racing series Grantrofeo Barchetta which was held in 1992 and 1993 throughout Italy and Europe. It featured sixteen races in total, most of them in Italy. The Barchetta had a backbone chassis made of aluminium which was unusual for a Maserati automobile for a time considering that the cars offered by Maserati had a steel unibody construction. It had a Formula 1 suspension geometry and body panels made of carbon fibre which resulted in a total weight of 775 kg (1,709 lb). The Barchetta was one of the last Maserati models built under De Tomaso ownership.

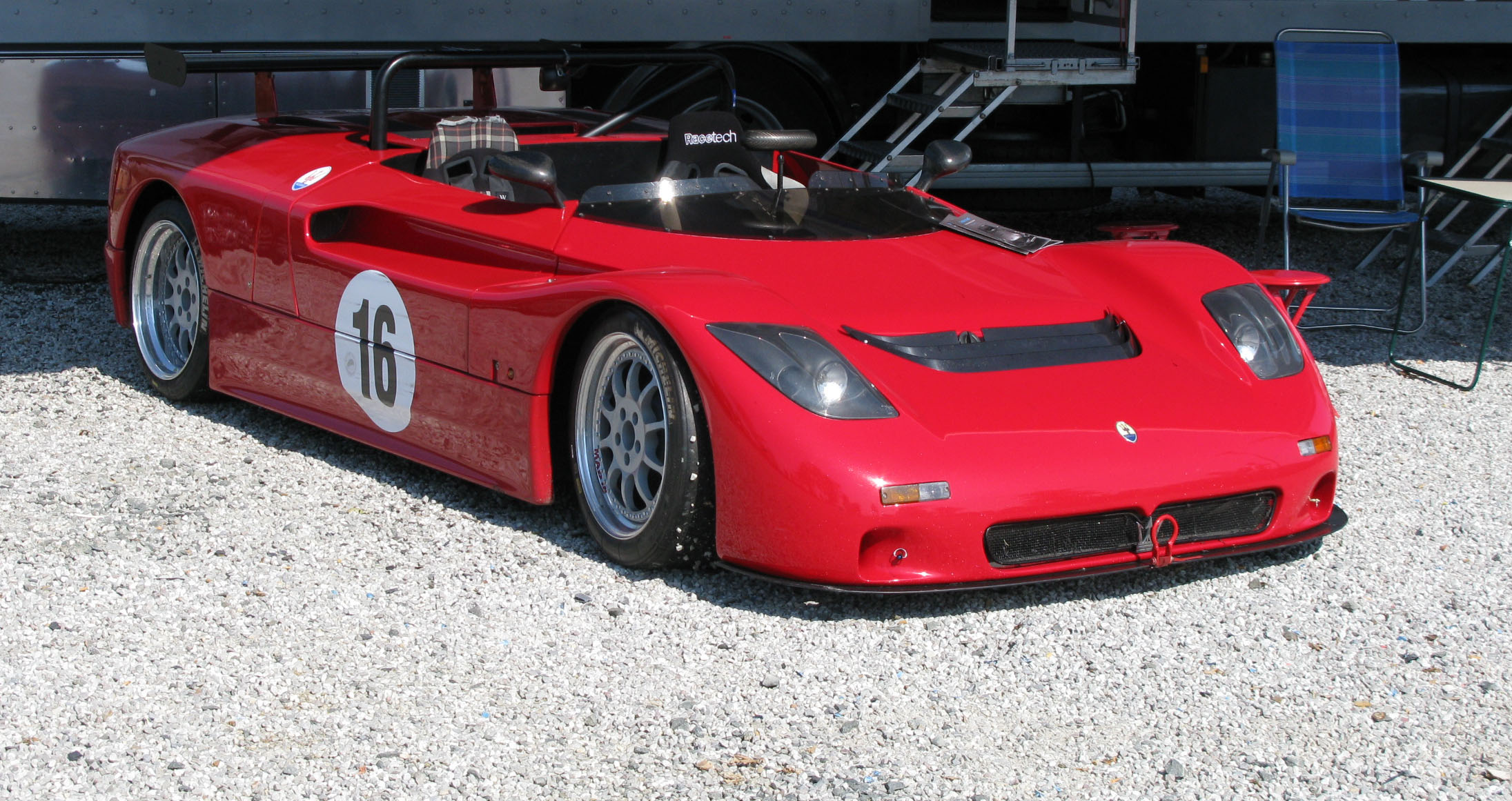
1991 Maserati Barchetta

16 examples of the racing model were produced by hand at the De Tomaso factory in Modena, plus two prototypes (one racing-corsa, one street-stradale model). It featured a mid-mounted Maserati AM501 V6 engine displacing 1,996 cc and was shared with the local 2.0 L engine offered in the Italian market on the Biturbo and the Ghibli. The engine had a peak power output of 315 PS (232 kW; 311 hp) at 7,200 rpm. The engine was mated to a 6-speed manual transmission manufactured by ZF Friedrichshafen and having straight cut gears. These modifications allowed the car to attain a claimed top speed of over 300 km/h (186 mph). Having a true open top design, driver protection was provided only by a small air deflector.

The central-frame concept was carried over in the De Tomaso Guarà, but the frame was around 130 mm (5.1 in) longer because it was fitted with a larger V8 engine.

This was thought as a way to inject much needed excitement and enthusiasm for Maserati that saw its reputation badly ruined by years of exciting but unreliable products, eventually culminating in Maserati's withdrawal from the North American market at this time.
