= Carello Lighting =

Automotive lighting brand

- Industry: Automotive lighting
- Founded: 1912
- Headquarters: Italy

Carello Lighting is an automotive lighting brand, and a former Italian independent company.

The company made automotive lights, and Windscreen wipers.

== History ==
The foundation of the original company was in Turin in 1876. Carello S.p.A. (a joint-stock company) was formed in 1912.

Massimo Carello became Managing Director of the Carello Group in 1980, great-grandson of the founder. The company was also known as Fausto Carello.

Carello Lighting plc (02137398) was founded in the UK. Magneti Marelli bought Carello in 1998.

== Structure ==
The company had a UK factory in Cannock in Staffordshire. In Italy the main factory was in Turin, with other factories in Cumiana, Campiglione-Fenile, and Anagni
