= Maserati Karif =

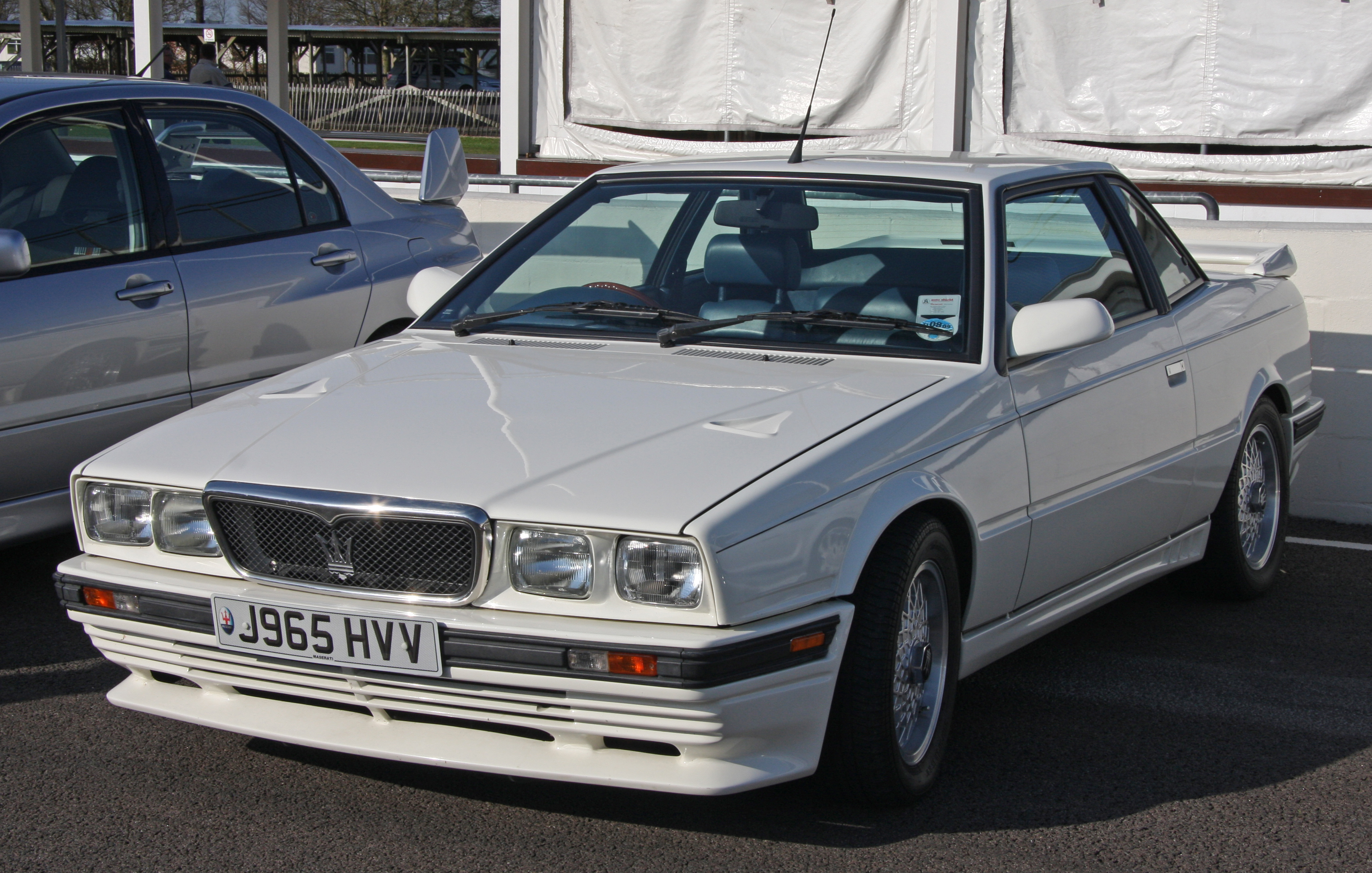

Overview
- Manufacturer: Maserati, Zagato
- Production: 1988–1991; 221 units
- Assembly: Italy: Modena

Body and chassis
- Class: Sports car (S)
- Body style: 2-door coupé
- Layout: Front-engine, rear-wheel-drive
- Platform: AM 339B28
- Related: Maserati Biturbo Spyder

Powertrain
- Engine: 2.8 L AM473 90° twin-turbocharged V6
- Transmission: 5-speed ZF manual

Dimensions
- Wheelbase: 2,400 mm (94.5 in)
- Length: 4,043 mm (159.2 in)
- Width: 1,714 mm (67.5 in)
- Height: 1,310 mm (51.6 in)
- Curb weight: 1,281–1,346 kg (2,824–2,967 lb)

The Maserati Karif (Tipo AM339) is a luxury coupé produced by Italian automobile manufacturer Maserati between 1988 and 1991. It was designed to be luxurious, but also sporty and agile to allow the driver to "feel like a racing driver again or for the first time". At the car's unveiling, Alejandro de Tomaso declared a very limited production run of 250 examples. In the end, only 221 units were sold over the time the car was built. Production dates are not entirely clear, but the last cars were sold late in the summer of 1992, long after they had been built.

In a throwback to Maserati's earlier naming practices for two-seater GTs, the car was named after the wind called "Karif", which blows South West across the Gulf of Aden at Berbera, Somalia.

The Karif was built on the same shortened chassis as the Zagato-bodied Maserati Spyder model, adding a fixed notchback coupé roof. It used the powerful iteration of the Maserati Biturbo engine: the AM473, a 2.8 90° V6 engine with 3 valves per cylinder, rated at 285 PS (210 kW) at 5,500 rpm. According to Maserati, the Karif could accelerate to 100 km/h (62 mph) from a standstill in 4.8 seconds, and achieve a top speed of over 255 km/h (158 mph). Other sources claim power outputs of 248 PS (182 kW), and 225 PS (165 kW) for the later catalysed model. With these lower power outputs, claimed top speeds were 233 and 230 km/h (145 and 143 mph) respectively. The rear limited-slip differential was a Ranger unit manufactured by GKN, while the 5-speed manual transmission was a ZF dog-leg unit.
