= Riverside International Automotive Museum =

Riverside International Automotive Museum (RIAM)
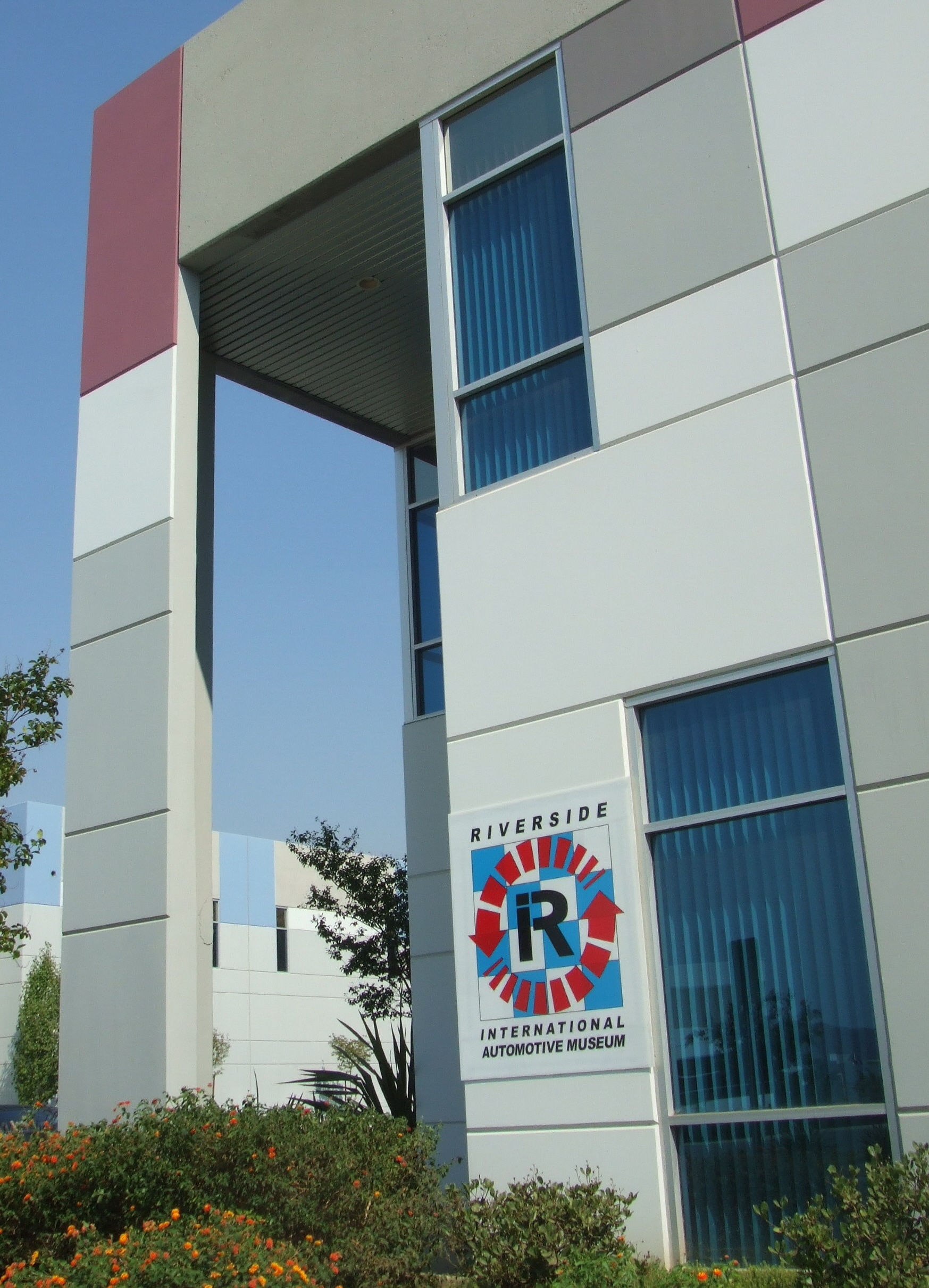
- Established: 2006
- Dissolved: 2016
- Location: 815 Marlborough Ave, Suite 200; Riverside, California, 92501; United States
- Coordinates: 33.9974°N 117.3282°W
- Type: Automotive museum
- Website: www.riversideinternational.org

The Riverside International Automotive Museum (RIAM) was a non-profit corporation, located in Riverside, California, dedicated to "Preserving the memory of California's rich motorsports heritage". Primary museum exhibits included memorabilia and artifacts from the Riverside International Raceway, the Ontario Motor Speedway, and local racing champion Dan Gurney. In June 2016, the museum closed following the death of Doug Magnon in 2015, one of the founders. The vehicle collection was sold in two different auctions in 2016, based on a decision by the Board of Directors.

The museum housed several history-making race cars, and the largest and most comprehensive collection of Maserati road cars in the United States, including an example of every Maserati model that has been made available in the U.S. since 1951.

== History ==
The RIAM was founded in 2006 as a 501.(c)(3) non-profit corporation by Ray and Doug Magnon, father and son racing enthusiasts.

Ray was a close friend of Skip Hudson during high school. Their mutual interest in racing lead both to also become friends with Dan Gurney, after Dan's family moved to Riverside. Skip and Dan's racing careers took off about the same time, and all three have remained friends. Doug Magnon, the president of the RIAM, caught the racing bug from his father Ray.

As part of their interest in automobile racing, the Magnons began collecting automobiles. Keeping with their Italian heritage the Magnons (originally spelled Magnone) started collecting Maseratis. It was one of the oldest of the Italian automobile brands, and it had a rich racing tradition in Europe.

They built a 20,000-square-foot (1,900 m^{2}) facility in 2006 to house their growing collection. After hiring Bruce Ward as the director, they opened the museum to the public in December, 2007.

== Events ==
In March 2009, the museum hosted the first Legends of Riverside Film Festival and charity fund raiser with the honoree being Dan Gurney. Dan was interviewed at the Saturday night gala by Ed Justice, Jr. Ed is a well-known radio and TV host and part of the Justice Brothers family. The following Riverside Legends were each honored in the consecutive years after Dan, Carroll Shelby, Parnelli Jones, Bobby Unser and Bob Bondurant. Each of these honorees were again interviewed by Ed Justice, Jr. The museum worked with Dave Wolin to bring what was previously known as the Southern Yosemite Automotive Film Festival to the museum. In addition to showcasing popular racing films, the annual event offers attendees an opportunity to personally meet famous racing legends of the past. In attendance at the 2009 event were racing greats Dan Gurney, Elliot and Stuart Forbes-Robinson, Bob Bondurant, Peter Brock, George Follmer, and Dick Guldstrand. The second annual event was held March 26–28, 2010 and featured special guest of honor Carroll Shelby. Racers Dave MacDonald, Phil Hill, Richie Ginther, Ronnie Bucknum and Chuck Daigh were honored as well. The event was not held in 2014 and no date has been set for the event in 2015.

The museum also makes the facility available for special events and business functions. One of the first such events held at the museum was the 2008 Old Riverside Foundation Awards, held March 16, 2008, when the RIAM received the Celebrating Riverside’s Heritage award.

== Collections and exhibits ==
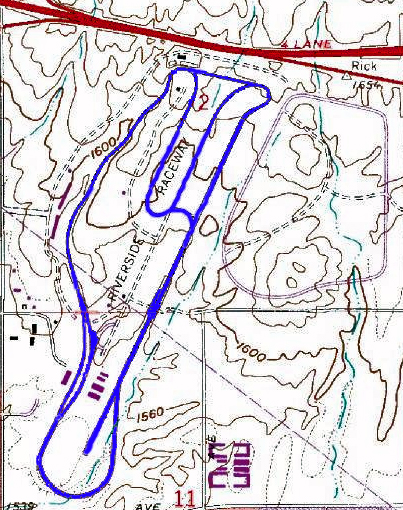
The 1969 to 1989 version of Riverside International Raceway

Riverside International Raceway: The Riverside International Raceway (RIR) operated from September 22, 1957 to July 2, 1989. For most of its life, the RIR was located in an unincorporated area of Riverside County, California, just outside the city limits of Riverside, and about ten miles (16 km) from the current location of the museum. In 1984 the RIR property became part of the city of Moreno Valley, and five years later was razed to build a shopping mall and housing development. A large part of the museum's focus is on the history of the RIR, with many photos and mementos on display. The museum also provides background on the 1953 and 1954 Orange Empire National Sports Car Races, a precursor to the RIR, that took place at March Air Force Base, which has since been renamed the March Joint Air Reserve Base.

Ontario Motor Speedway: A second California raceway highlighted by the museum is the Ontario Motor Speedway (OMS) which was located in Ontario, California. The OMS was designed similar to the Indianapolis Motor Speedway, but was only in operation from 1970 until 1981.

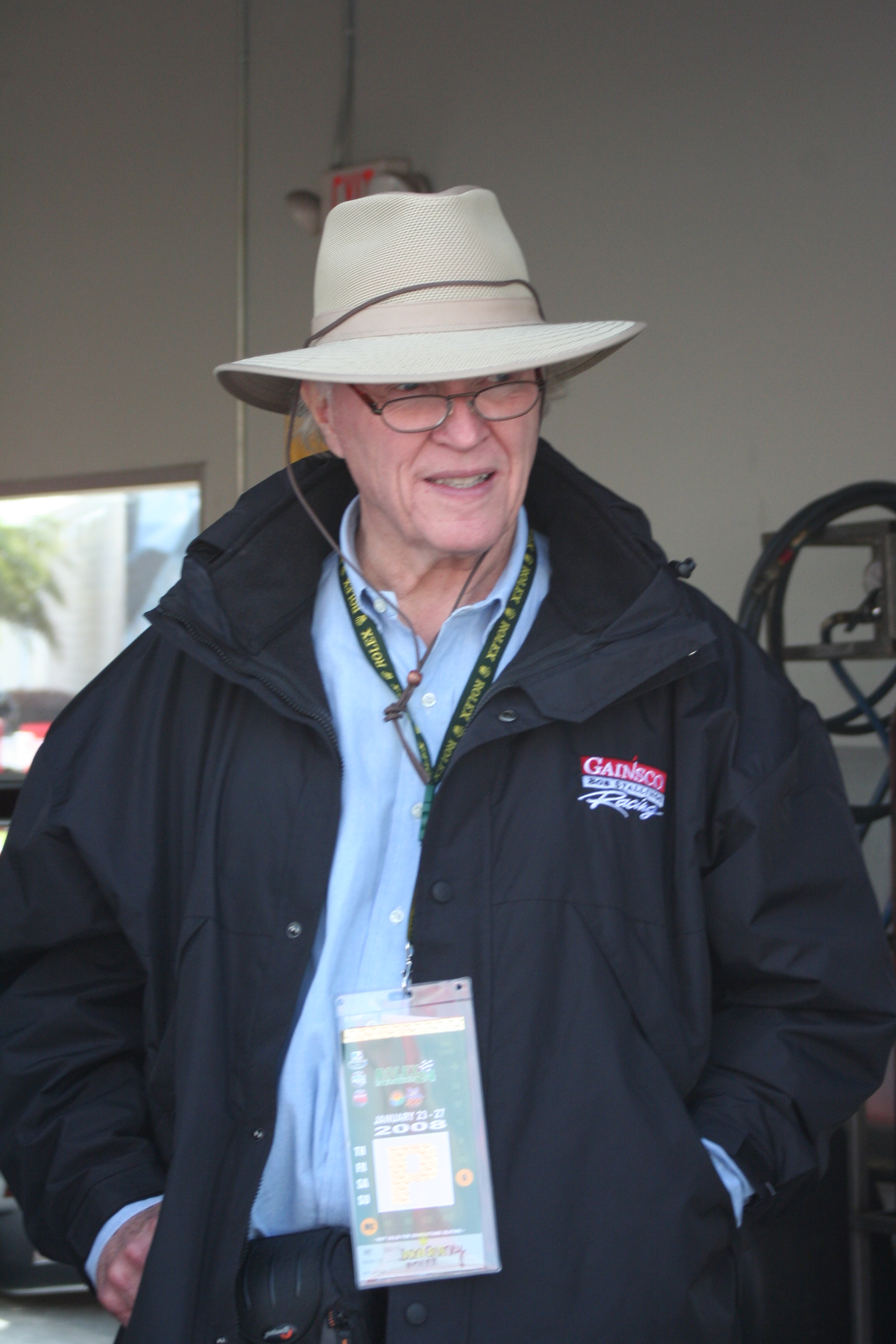
Dan Gurney at the 2008 Rolex 24 Hours of Daytona.

Dan Gurney: Although born and raised in Port Jefferson, New York, Dan Gurney moved with his parents to Riverside, California after he graduated from high school in 1948. He quickly became involved in auto racing, and began racing hot rods around the orange groves of Riverside. Eventually he became a top road racer, and one of the most popular Formula One Grand Prix drivers in the sport. He won 51 races, and was the first driver ever to win in all four major categories: Grand Prix, Indy Car, NASCAR and Sports Car. Gurney won his first NASCAR race at Riverside International Raceway in 1963. A hometown favorite, he went on to win a total of five races on his local track. One of the museum's main exhibits highlights Dan Gurney's career, honoring him as a local hero.

Archives: The RIAM has assembled a large archive of racing related materials, and seeks to expand the archives through acquisitions and donations. The archives, which are currently being digitized, include racing related, photos, magazines, programs, brochures, and posters, as well as official documents pertaining to races, racetracks and racecars from around the state. The archive also contains many hours of racing-related audio and video recordings.

Restoration projects: In a corner of the museum's showroom are two service bays where visitors can get an upclose look at museum restoration projects that are underway.

== Automobiles ==
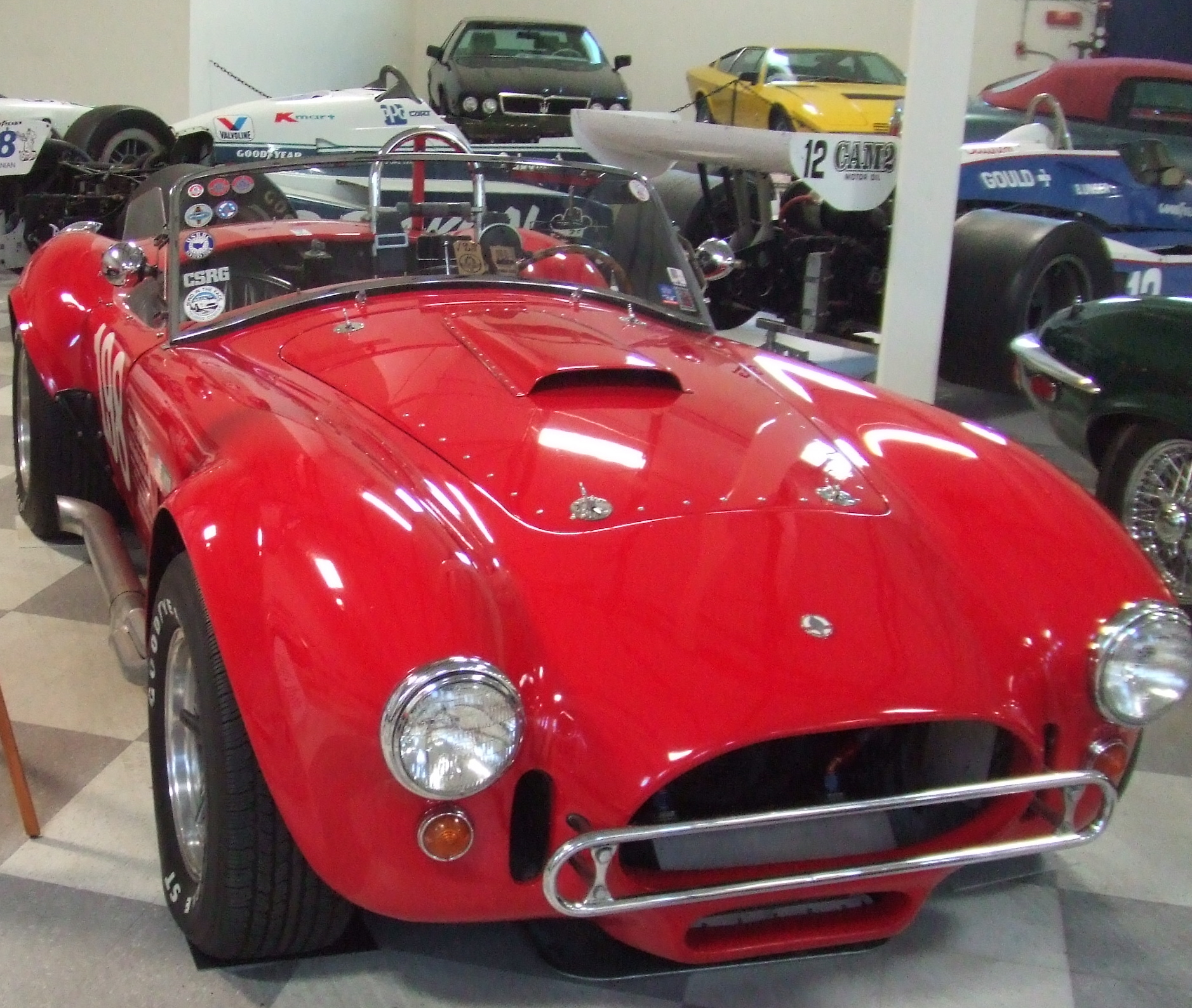
1966 Shelby 247SC Cobra

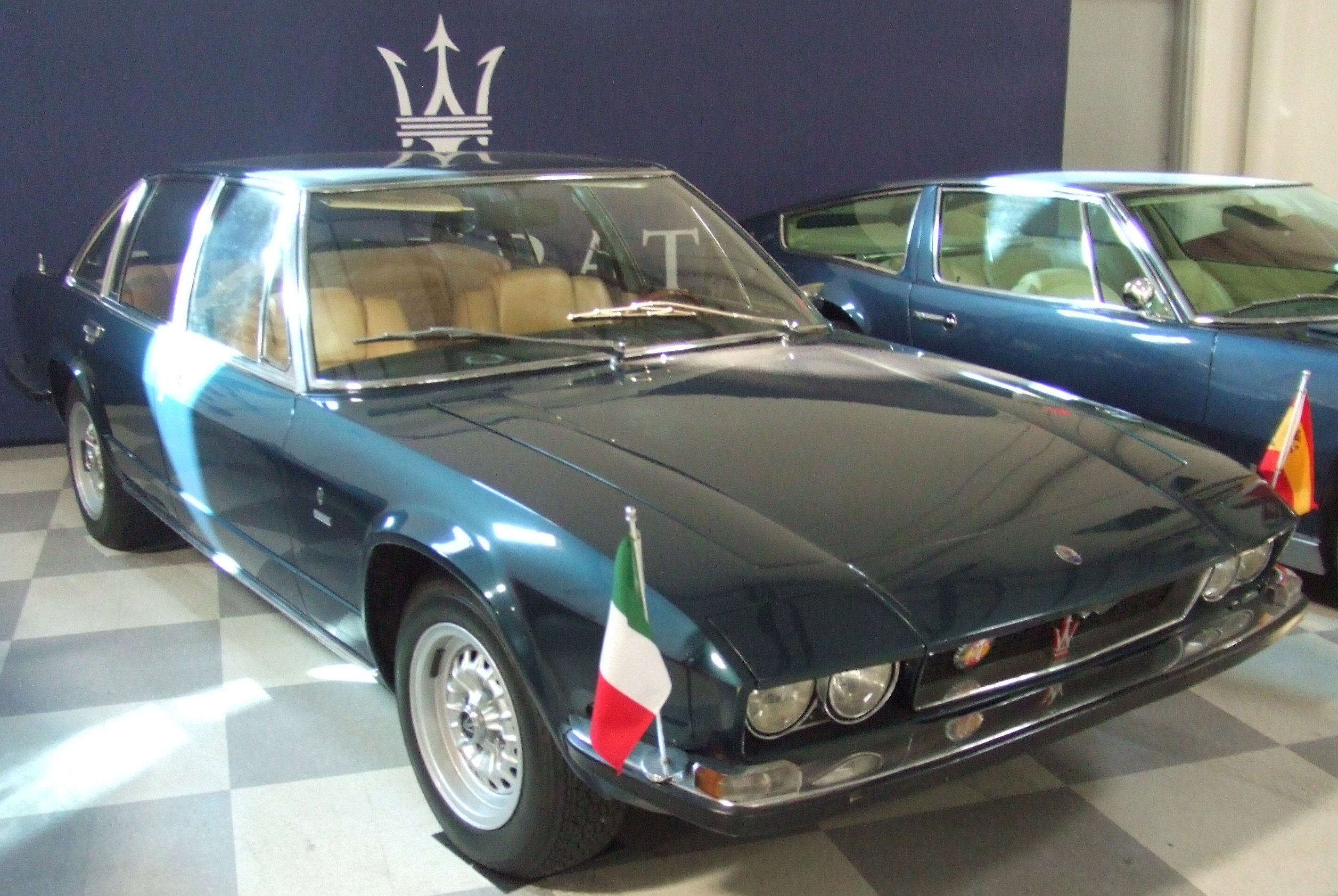
Frua-bodied Maserati Quattroporte

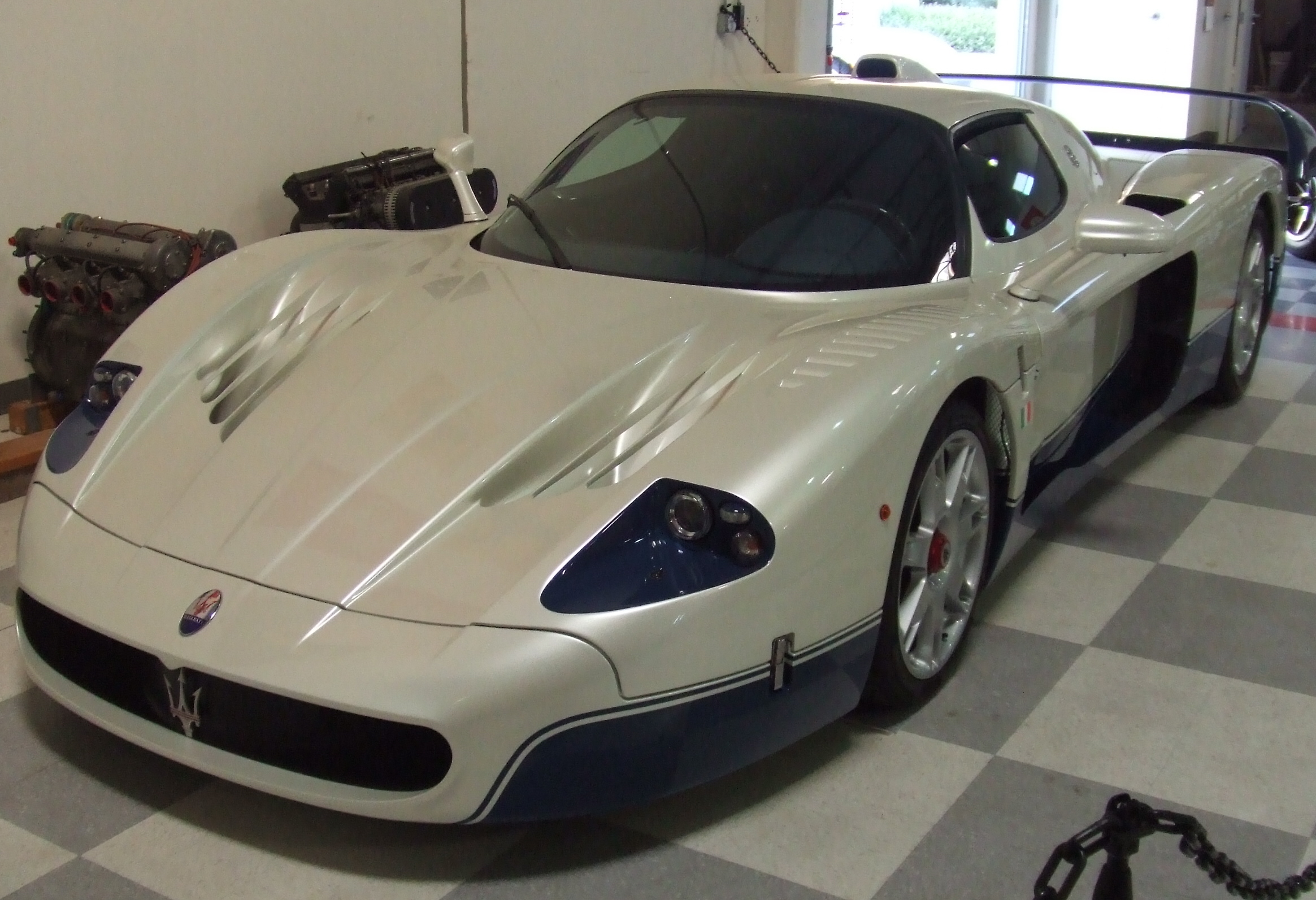
2006 Maserati MC12 Stradale

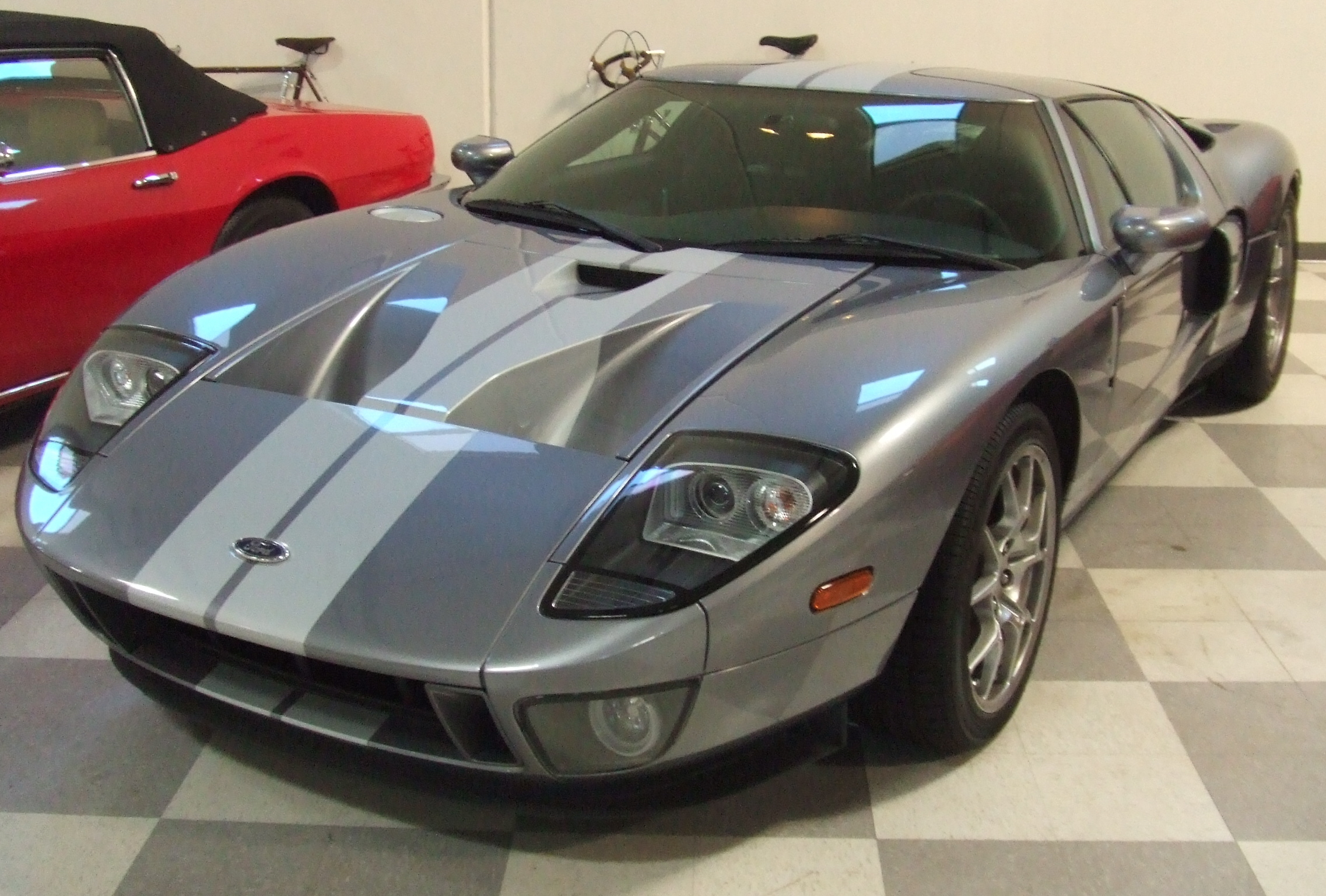
2006 Ford GT1

One of the principles of the museum's founders is to maintain all vehicles in roadworthy condition, and to ensure they get regular use. In addition, some of the cars at the museum are on loan from other museums or private owners. For both these reasons the cars on display at any given time may vary.

| Manufacturer | Year | Model | Comment |
|---|---|---|---|
| Maserati | 1951 | A6G 2000 Coupe | By Pininfarina. |
| Maserati | 1962 | 3500 GTi | Once owned by actor Dan Blocker, best known for his role as Hoss Cartwright in the 60's TV series Bonanza. He was also a racing enthusiast and original owner of the Nickey-Vinegaroon race car (a 1965 Huffaker Genie MK10). |
| Maserati | 1963 | 3500 GTi | |
| Maserati | 1964 | Quattroporte | |
| Maserati | 1967 | Quattroporte | |
| Maserati | 1965 | Mistral Spyder | |
| Maserati | 1967 | Mistral Coupe | |
| Maserati | 1968 | Mexico | |
| Maserati | 1968 | Ghibli Coupe | |
| Maserati | 1970 | Indy | |
| Maserati | 1971 | Quattroporte II, Frua Prototipo | By Pietro Frua, and originally owned by King Juan Carlos of Spain |
| Maserati | 1973 | Bora | |
| Maserati | 1973 | Merak | |
| Maserati | 1974 | Merak | |
| Maserati | 1975 | Khamsin | |
| Maserati | 1980 | Kyalami | |
| Maserati | 1980 | Quattroporte III | |
| Maserati | 1982 | Quattroporte III | Color: Rosso Rubino. Once owned by actor David Carradine, best known for his role as Caine in the television series Kung Fu. |
| Maserati | 1982 | Quattroporte III | |
| Maserati | 1984 | Quattroporte III | |
| Maserati | 1989 | Biturbo Spyder | |
| Maserati | 2002 | Spyder Cambiocorsa | |
| Maserati | 2005 | Spyder 90th Anniversary | |
| Maserati | 2005 | Quattroporte | |
| Maserati | 2006 | GranSport Victory | |
| Maserati | 2006 | MC12 Stradale | |
| Ferrari | 1977 | 308 GTB | |
| Ferrari | 1984 | Berlinetta Boxer injected (512 BBi) | |
| Ferrari | 2001 | 360 Modena Spider | |
| Ford | 2006 | GT | |
| Jaguar | 1961 | MK II Sedan | |
| Jaguar | 1967 | 420 G Sedan | |
| Jaguar | 1974 | XKE Roadster | |
| Jaguar | 1994 | XJ220 | |
| Custom Race Car | 1970 | Gurney Olsonite Eagle | |
| Custom Race Car | 1980 | Penske PC-7 | |

== Motorcycles ==
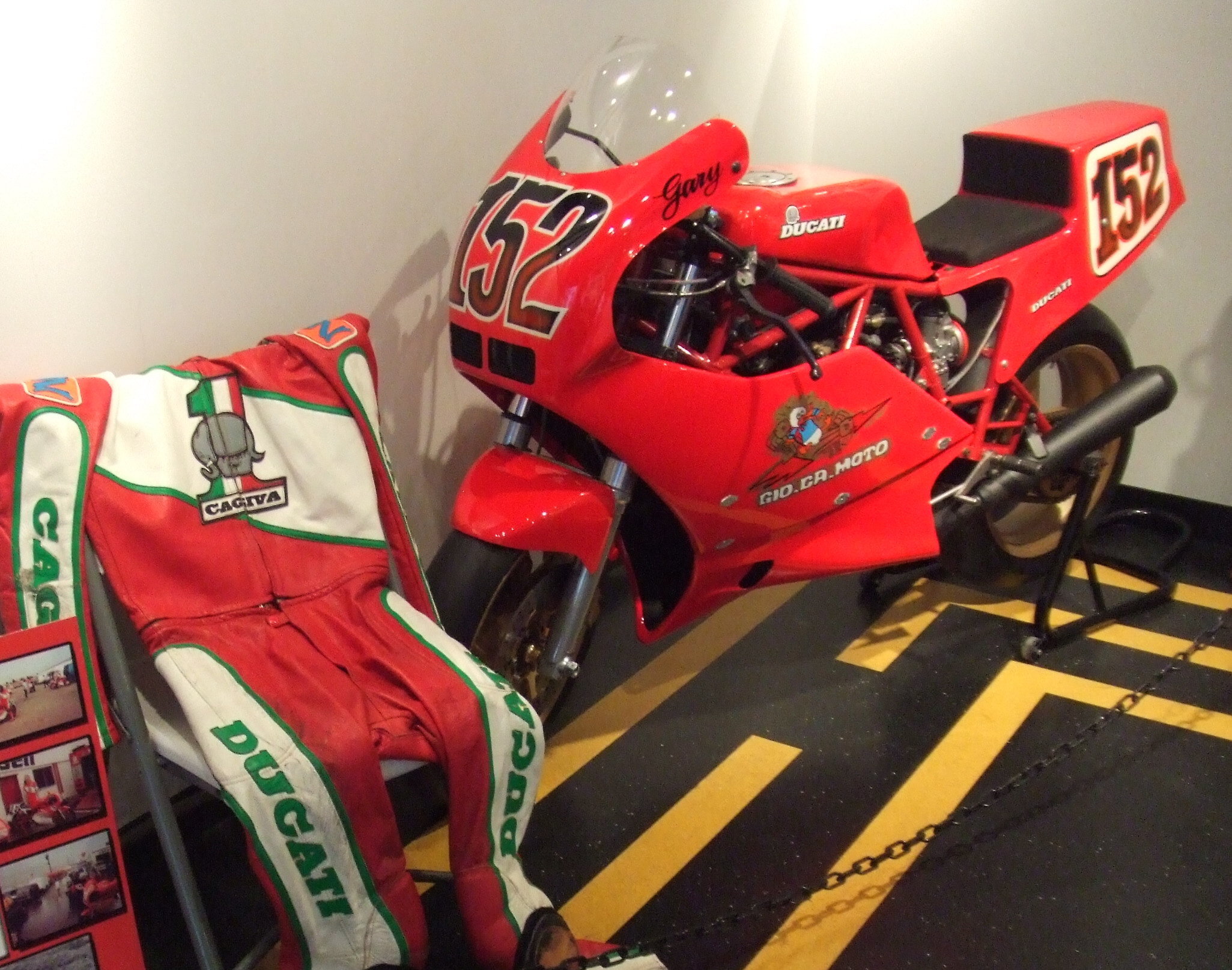
1986 Ducati 750 F1

The RIAM has one motorcycle on display. It is a 1986 Ducati 750 F1 that was ridden by Gary Patton to the 1988 American Road Racing Association Open Twin class championship. During the 1987 and 1988 seasons, the motorcycle won events at Riverside International Raceway and Willow Springs Raceway.

== See also ==
- List of Maserati vehicles
