= Vignale =

Automotive sub-brand owned by Ford

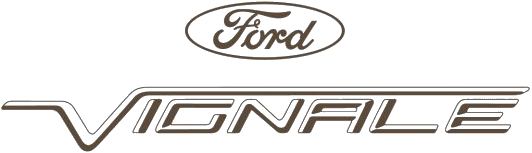
- Formerly: Carrozzeria Alfredo Vignale & C.
- Type: Private (1948–1969); Subsidiary (1969–1973)
- Industry: Automotive
- Founded: 1948 in Turin
- Founder: Alfredo Vignale
- Defunct: 1973; 53 years ago
- Fate: Company defunct; brand taken over by Ford in 1973
- Headquarters: Italy
- Services: Automotive design, coachbuilding
- Owner: Ford (1973–present)
- Parent: De Tomaso (1969–1973)

Vignale is the luxury car sub-brand of Ford Motor Company used in automobiles sold in Europe. The former company Carrozzeria Alfredo Vignale was an Italian automobile coachbuilder established in 1948 at Via Cigliano, Turin, by Alfredo Vignale (1913–1969). After its founder's death in 1969, Carrozzeria Vignale was acquired by De Tomaso (founded by Argentine businessman and race driver Alejandro de Tomaso). The studio ceased operation in 1973, but ownership of the name was taken over by Ford Motor Company (which had majority ownership of De Tomaso).

Since then, Ford has continued to use the name sporadically to the present day. Up to present days, Ford of Europe released Vignale versions of models Mondeo, Edge, Fiesta, Focus, and Kuga, among others.

== History ==
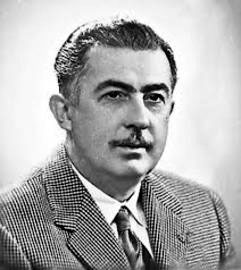
Alfredo Vignale, founder

The first body on a Fiat 500 Topolino base was made in 1948, followed by a special Fiat 1100. Most customers were Italian firms, such as Cisitalia, Alfa Romeo, Ferrari, Fiat, Maserati, Lancia. In 1952, Vignale collaborated with Briggs Cunningham to jointly produce the Continental C-3. A close cooperation was maintained with Giovanni Michelotti, who in 1959 opened his own design studio and in 1962 definitely concluded the cooperation.

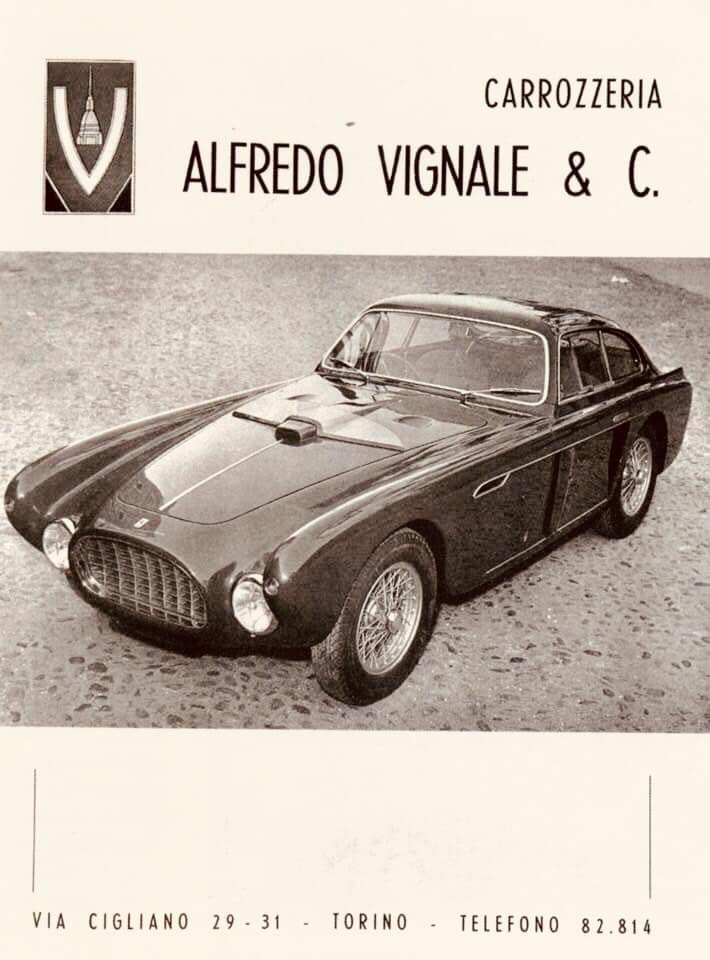
1959 ad for the Ferrari 340 coupe bodied by Carrozzeria Vignale

Also Rodolfo Bonetto designed a couple of cars in the early 1950s before moving to Boneschi. Later Vignale designs were created by Virginio Vairo. Vignale also designed and built cars themselves, usually low volume variants of the main production cars of these automobile manufacturers. Amongst them were 850, Samantha, Eveline and the Vignale Gamine, based on the Fiat 500. In 1968, Vignale designed the body of their last prototype, the Tatra 613. Vignale was taken over by De Tomaso in 1969 who already owned Carrozzeria Ghia. Shortly after selling, Alfredo Vignale died in a car crash on 16 November 1969. Both coachbuilders were sold to Ford in 1973 but the Vignale brand was discontinued.

At the 1993 Geneva Motor Show, Aston Martin, at the time owned by Ford, produced a concept car called Lagonda Vignale. Ford then used the Vignale name in the Ford Focus Vignale concept car introduced at the 2004 Paris Motor Show, but the production model was named the Ford Focus Coupé-Cabriolet.

In September 2013, Ford of Europe announced plans to resurrect the Vignale name as an upscale luxury sub-brand of Ford. The cars would be visually distincted from regular Ford products and have an improved dealership experience. Exclusive services, such as free lifetime car washes, will be offered as well. The first Ford model to receive the Vignale name was the 2015 Ford Mondeo.

On 1 March 2016 Ford of Europe announced a Kuga Vignale concept vehicle at the Geneva Motor Show where the company also announced the line-up of Vignale products, S-Max, Edge, and Mondeo Vignale five-door models debut alongside Kuga Vignale Concept, offering a vision of the future of upscale SUVs as well as revealing Vignale Ambassadors and the signature Vignale collection.

== Designs ==
List of cars designed and bodied at Carrozzeria Vignale or coachbuilt to a third-party design.

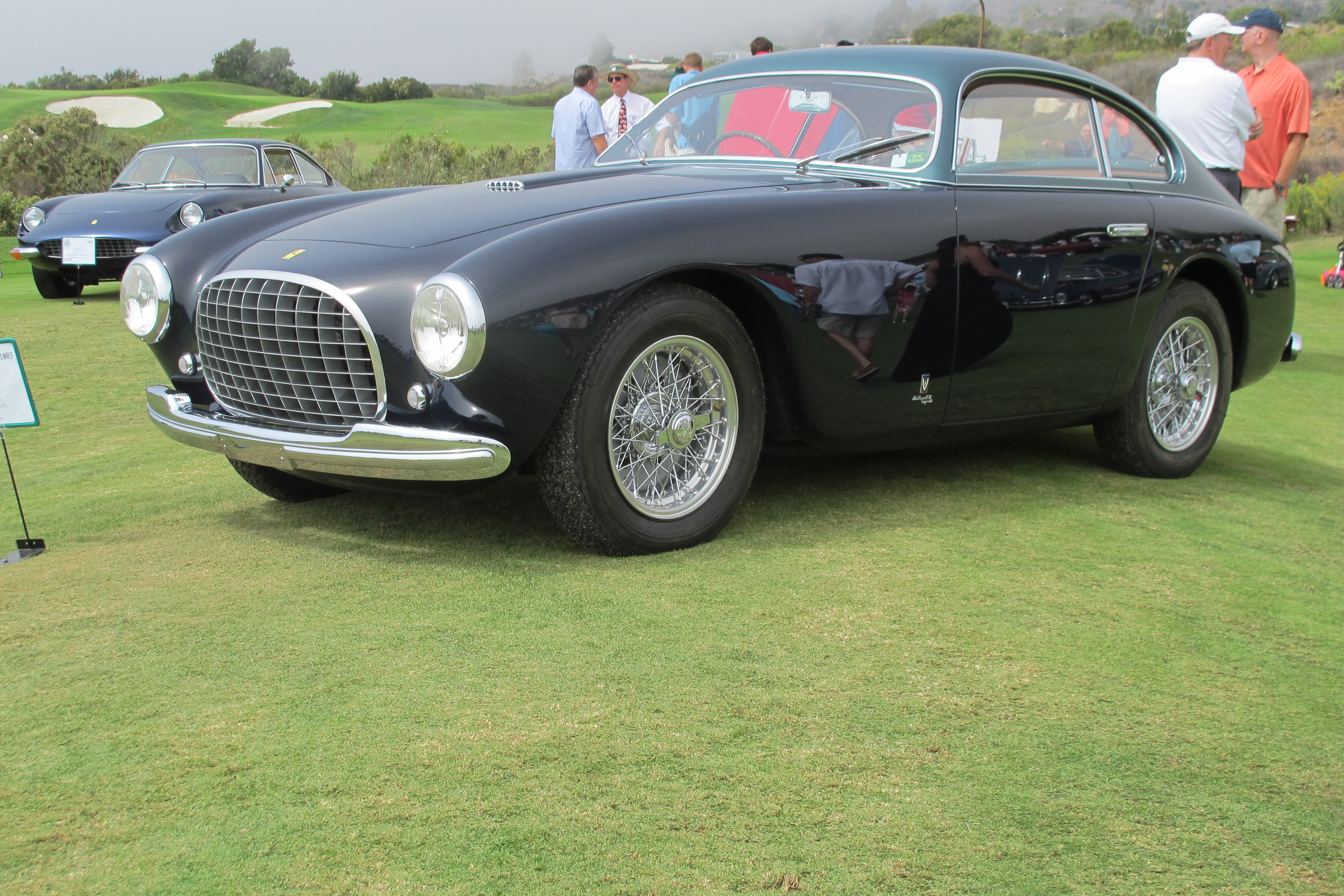
1951 Ferrari 212 Vignale coupé

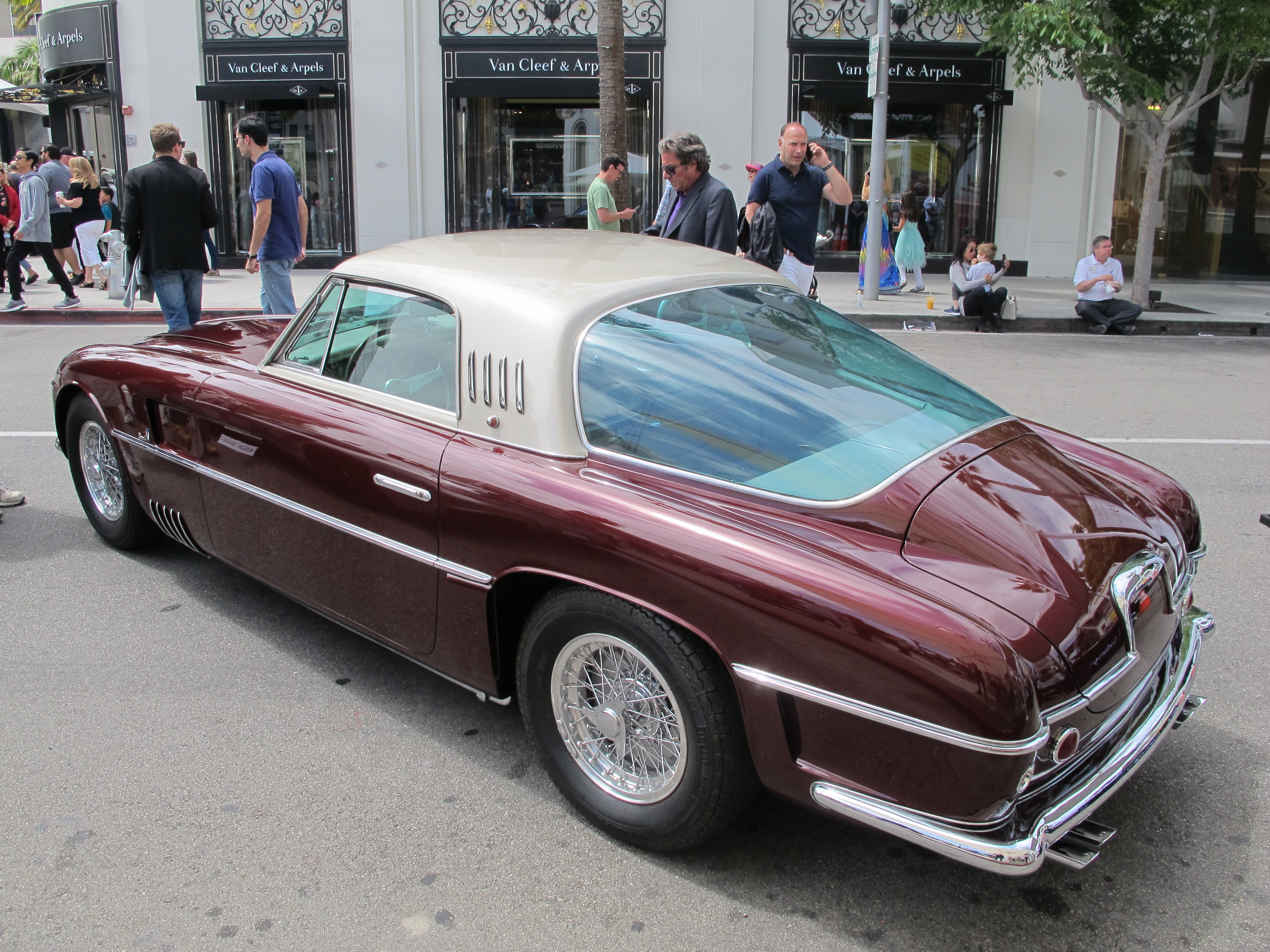
1953 Ferrari 375 America with bodywork by Vignale

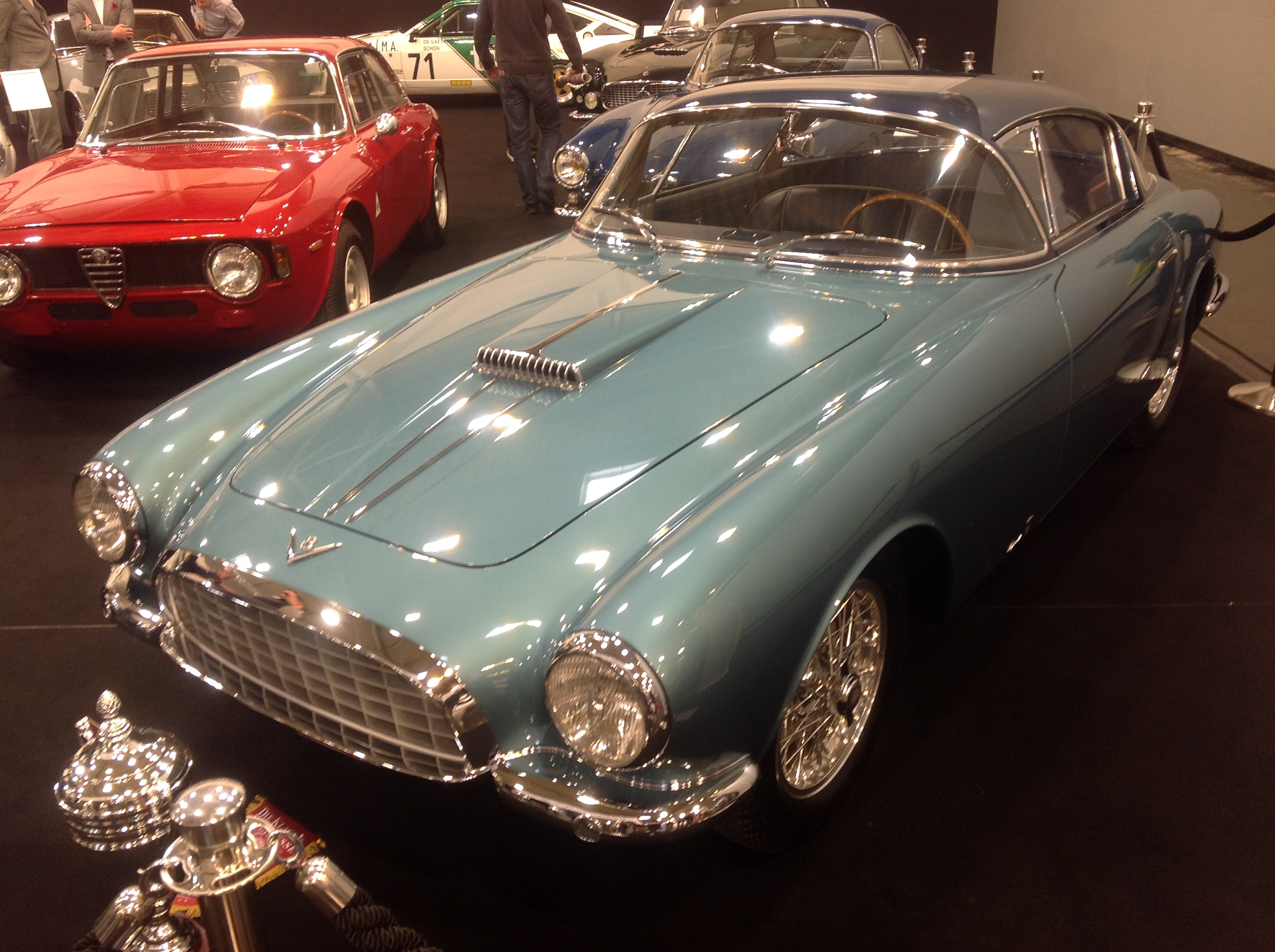
Fiat 8V Vignale Coupé

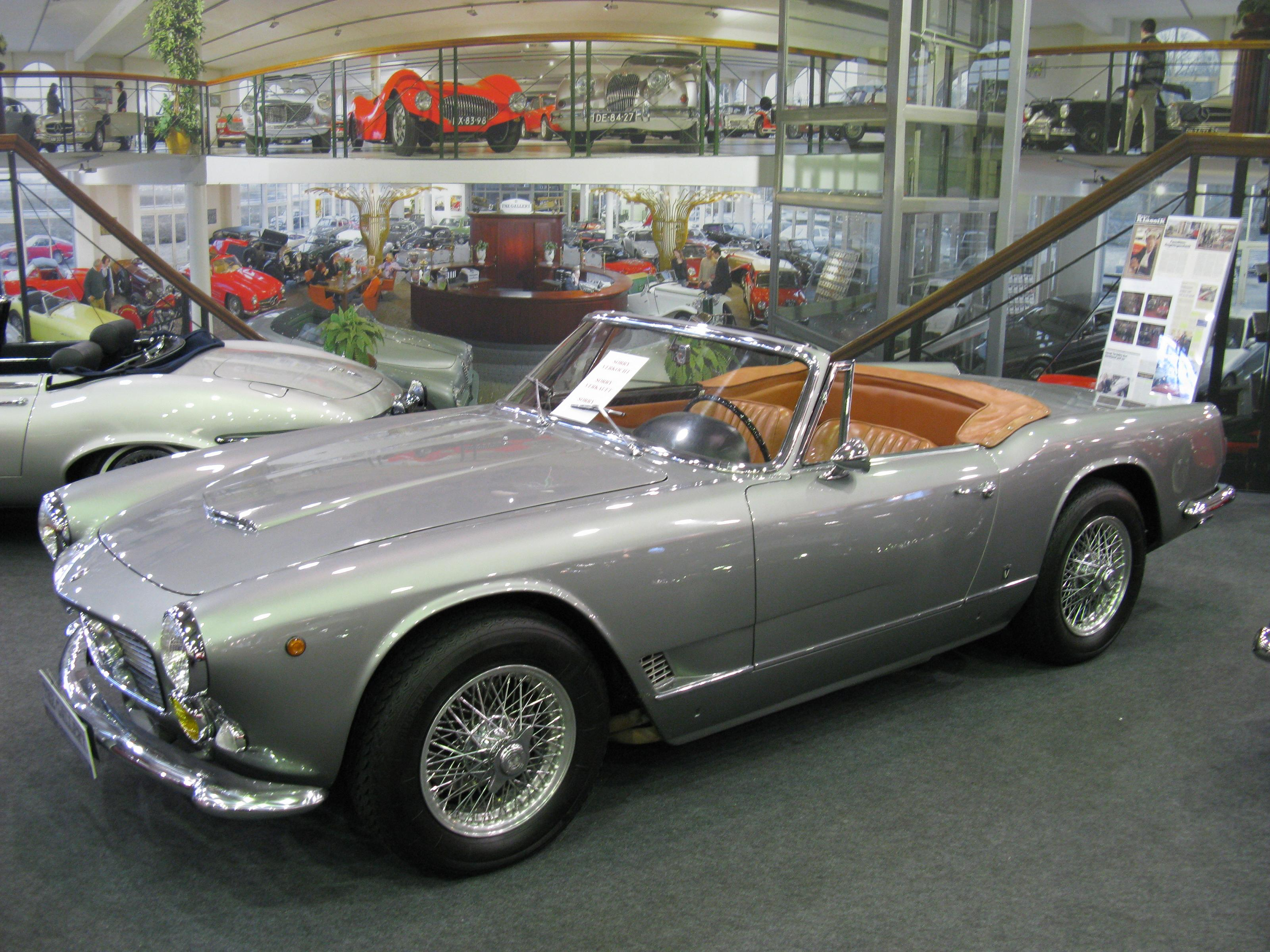
Maserati 3500 GT Spyder

1961 Kelly Corvette (at right).

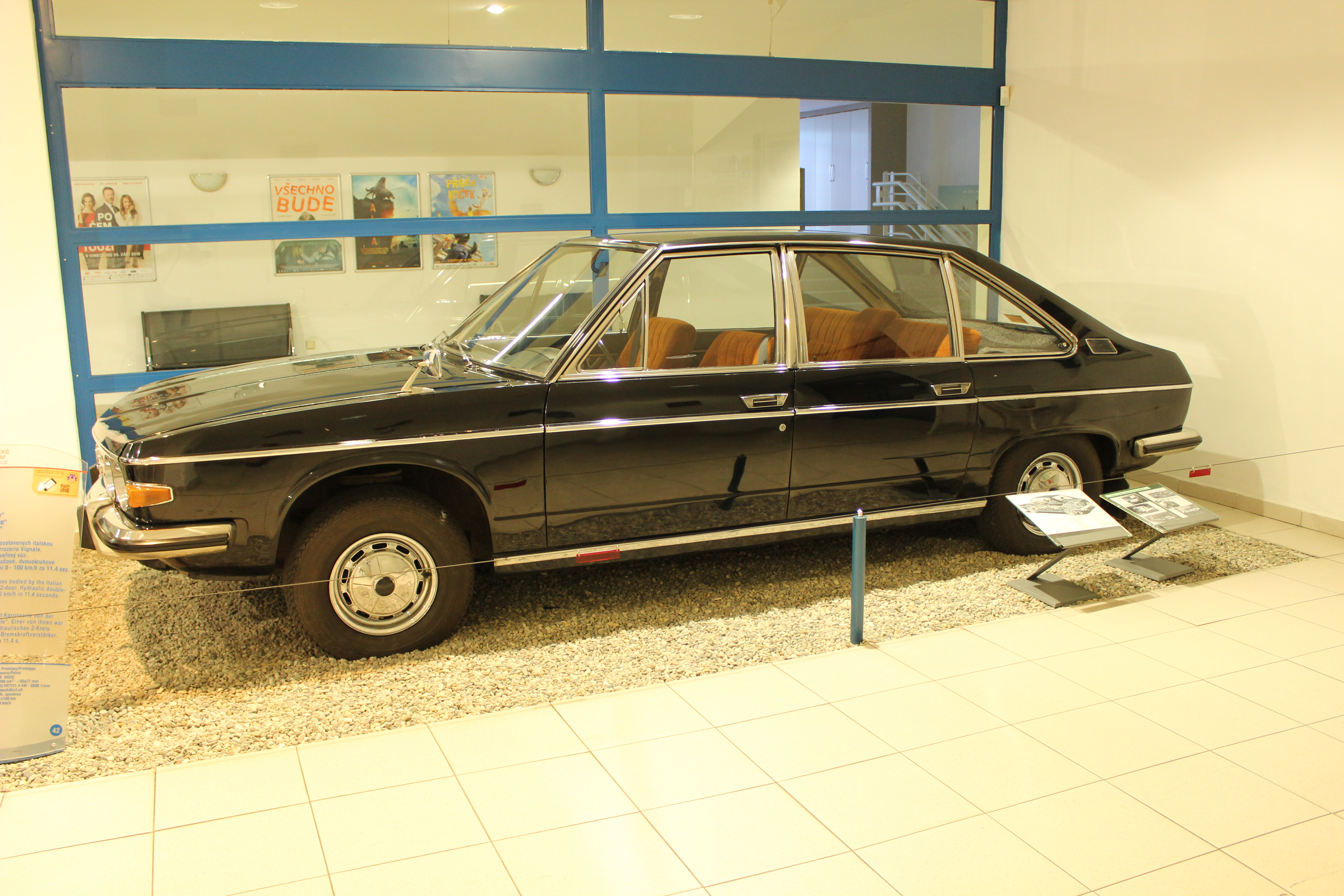
The Vignale designed Tatra 613 prototype

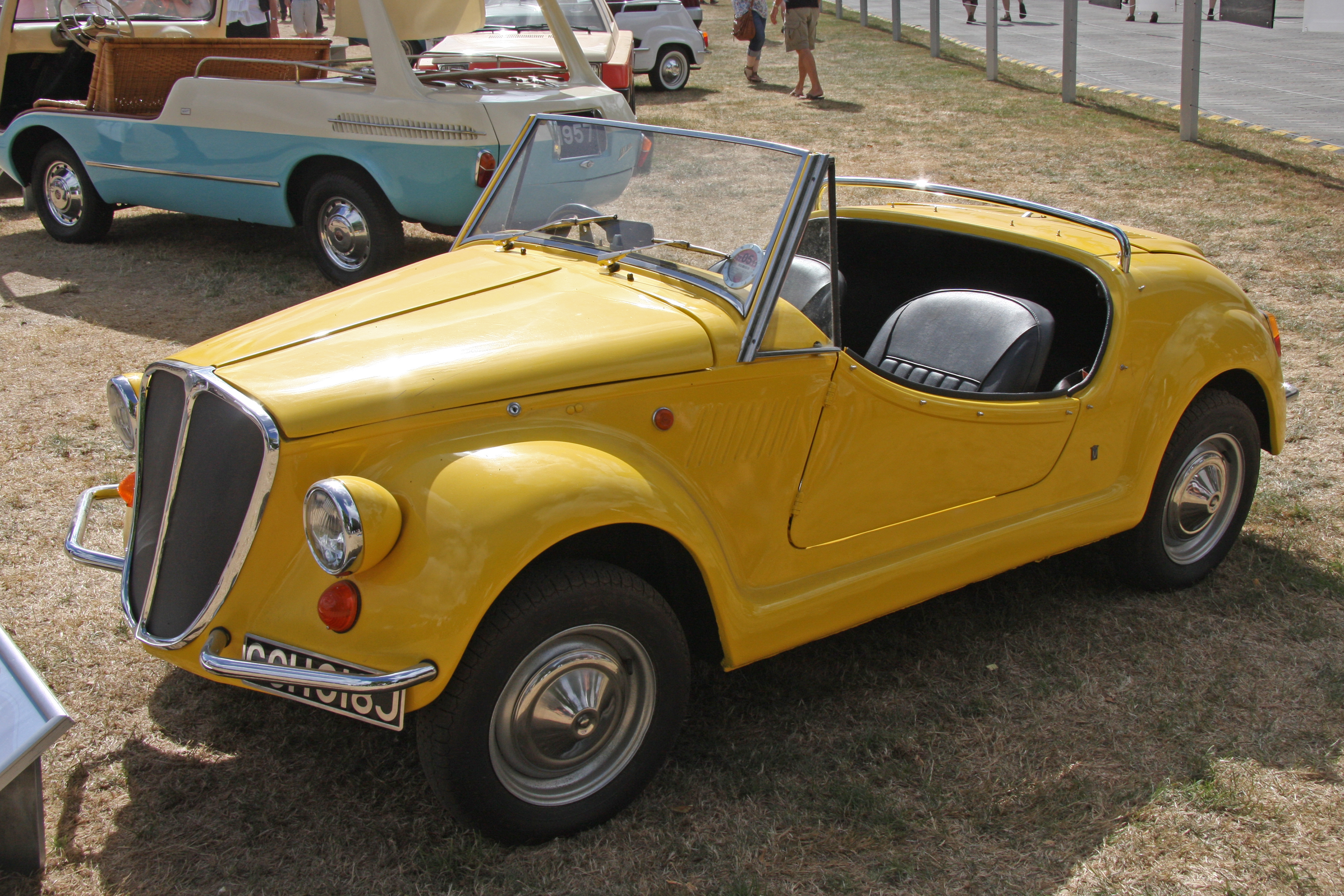
Vignale Gamine by Alfredo Vignale

- Abarth 204A Berlinetta
- Abarth 205A Berlinetta
- Alfa Romeo 412 Barchetta, 1951
- Alfa Romeo 1900 La Fleche Spider and Coupé.
- Alfa Romeo 2000 Coupé
- American Motors AMX 1966 Coupé
- Aston Martin DB2/4 Coupé
- Cisitalia 202, 202 CMM
- Cunningham C-3 Coupé and Cabriolet
- Daihatsu Compagno
- De Tomaso Pantera, early production
- Ferrari 166 MM Coupé and Spider
- Ferrari 166 Inter Coupé
- Ferrari 212 Export Barchetta, Spider, Cabriolet and Coupé
- Ferrari 212 Inter Coupé, Spider and Cabriolet
- Ferrari 225 S Coupé and Spider
- Ferrari 250 S Coupé
- Ferrari 250 MM Coupé and Spider
- Ferrari 250 Europa Coupé and Spider
- Ferrari 250 Europa GT Coupé
- Ferrari 340 America Coupé and Spider
- Ferrari 340 Mexico Coupé and Spider
- Ferrari 340 MM Spider
- Ferrari 342 America Cabriolet
- Ferrari 625 TF Coupé and Spider
- Ferrari 375 America Coupé
- Ferrari 330 GT Shooting brake, rebodied in 1967
- Fiat 600 Coupé, Spider
- Fiat 850 Coupé, Spider, Berlina
- Fiat 1400 Cabriolet
- Fiat 1300 and 1500 Sportiva fastback.
- Fiat 1500 Coupé
- Fiat 124 Coupé Eveline
- Fiat 125 Coupé Samantha
- Fiat 8V Coupé, Cabriolet and Demon Rouge
- Ford-Cisitalia 808 coupé and roadster
- Jensen Interceptor, early production
- Jensen FF, early production
- Jensen Nova concept car
- Lancia Appia Cabriolet, 1957; Lusso Coupé, prototype and series production cars
- Lancia Aprilia Coupé for Vignale, 1949
- Lancia Aurelia B50 Coupé and Berlina; B52 Coupé
- Lancia Aurelia Nardi Blue Ray 1 and 2, commissioned by Enrico Nardi
- Lancia Flavia Cabriolet, would become the last Michelotti design for Vignale
- Lincoln by Vignale, a 1987 show car
- Maserati A6G 2000 Coupé, Paris Show car
- Maserati A6GCS/53 Spider Corsa, commissioned by Tony Parravano and rebodied by Scaglietti in 1955.
- Maserati 3500 GT Spyder, prototypes and series production cars
- Maserati Sebring 1962, prototype and series production cars
- Maserati Mexico prototype, based on a Maserati 5000 GT chassis rebodied in 1965.
- Maserati Mexico series production car
- Maserati Indy
- Matra M530 Sport prototype
- O.S.C.A. MT4-2AD Coupé
- Packard Eight 'Victoria' Vignale Cabriolet (built in 1948 on a 1939 chassis)
- Rolls-Royce Silver Wraith Limousine, chassis number LCLW14
- Standard Vanguard Vignale
- Tatra 613 prototypes and production cars
- Triumph Italia
- Vignale Gamine by Alfredo Vignale

== Notable designers ==
- Alfredo Vignale
- Giovanni Michelotti
- Virginio Vairo
