= Maserati Indy =

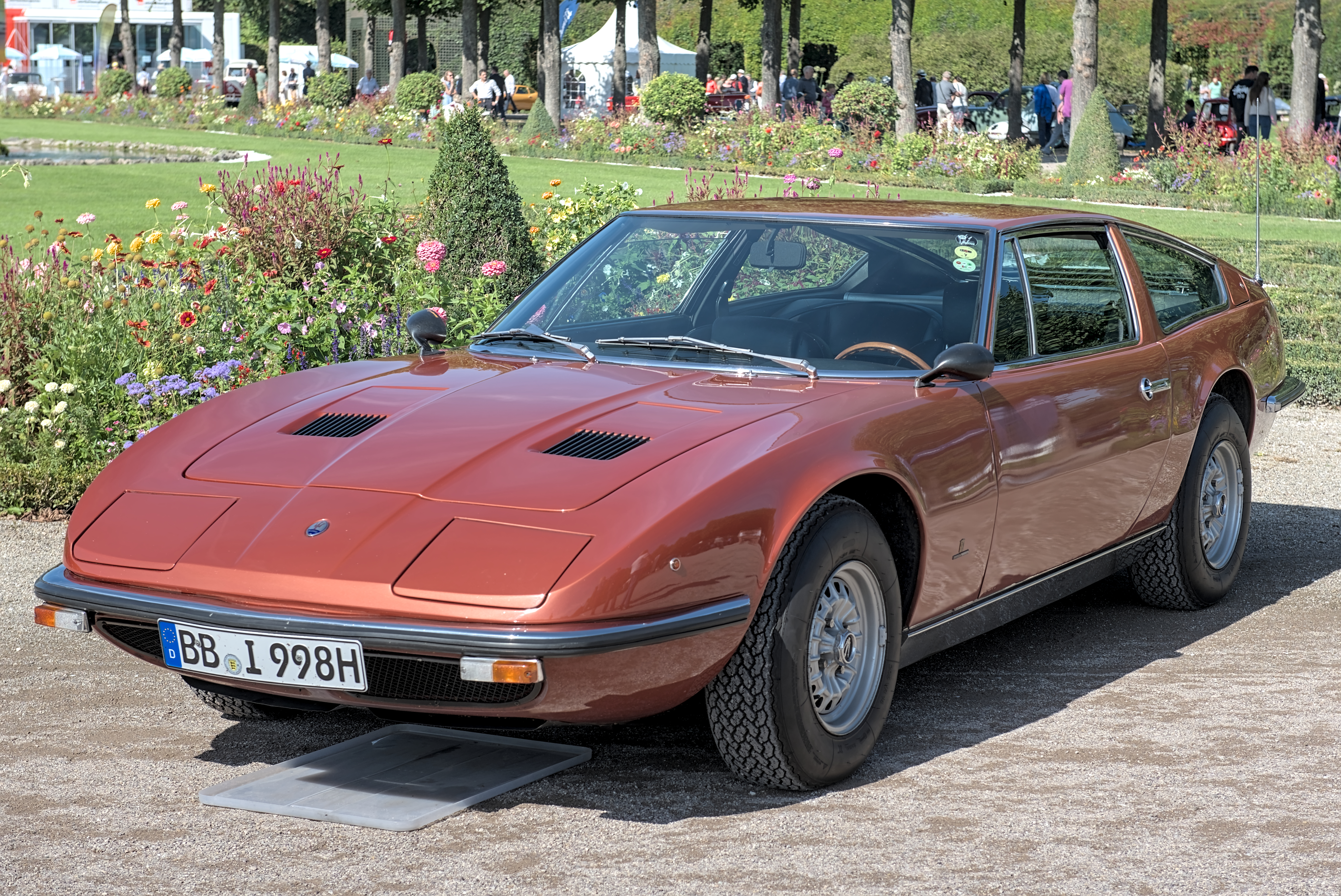

Overview
- Manufacturer: Maserati
- Production: 1969–1975; 1,104 produced
- Assembly: Italy: Modena
- Designer: Virginio Vairo at Vignale

Body and chassis
- Class: Grand tourer (S)
- Body style: 2-door 2+2 coupé
- Layout: Front-engine, rear-wheel-drive

Powertrain
- Engine: 4.2 L Tipo AM 107 V8; 4.7 L Tipo AM 107/1 V8; 4.9 L Tipo AM 107/49 V8
- Transmission: 5-speed ZF manual; 3-speed Borg-Warner automatic

Dimensions
- Wheelbase: 2,600 mm (102.4 in)
- Length: 4,740 mm (186.6 in)
- Width: 1,760 mm (69.3 in)
- Height: 1,220 mm (48.0 in)
- Kerb weight: 1,680 kg (3,703.8 lb)

Chronology
- Predecessor: Maserati Sebring

The Maserati Indy (Tipo AM116) is a four-seater fastback grand tourer produced by the Italian car manufacturer Maserati from 1969 to 1975. It was the first car produced by Maserati under Citroën ownership.

== History ==
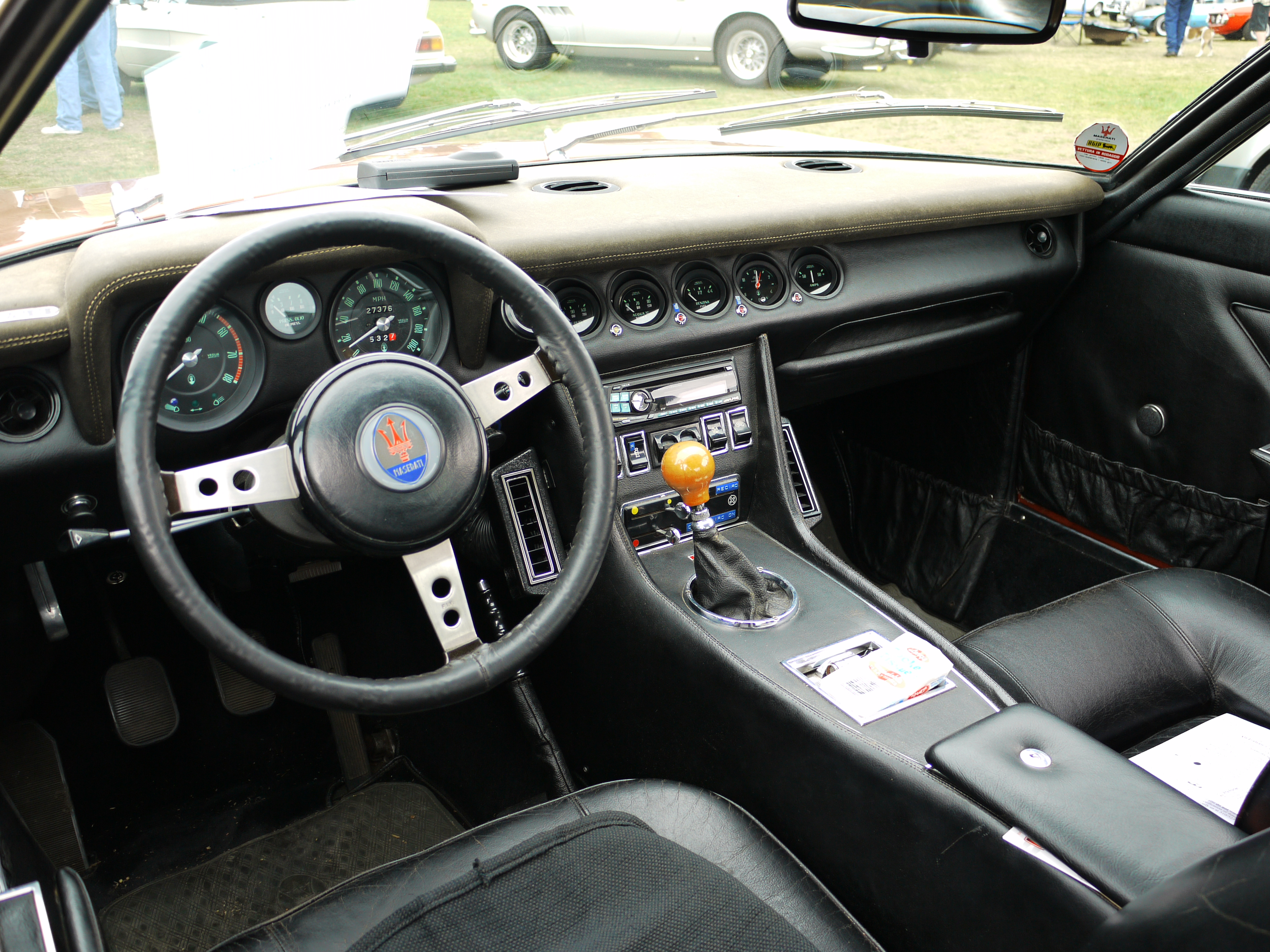
Interior

The Indy was conceived as an alternative to the Ghibli offering a V8 engine and room for four people; it effectively replaced both the ageing six-cylinder 2+2 Maserati Sebring—which descended from the 1957 3500 GT— and the first generation Quattroporte. Two coachbuilders showed their proposals at the November 1968 Salone dell'automobile di Torino, both based on a Maserati 4.2-litre chassis. On Ghia's stand there was the Simùn, a 2+2 berlinetta designed by Giorgetto Giugiaro; on Carrozzeria Vignale's, a sleek 4-seater fastback penned by the internal technical office led by Virginio Vairo and Elio Mainardi. Both coachbuilders had already an established relationship with Maserati, as Vignale had been responsible for the 3500 GT Spyder, Mexico and Sebring, while Giugiaro had recently penned the Ghibli at Ghia.

Vignale's prototype was preferred, and the production model was launched by Maserati at the Geneva Motor Show the following March. The car was christened Indy in honour of Maserati's two victories at the Indy 500.

At its launch in 1969 the Indy was offered with a 4.2-litre V8 engine. From 1970 a 4.7-litre Indy 4700 was offered alongside the 4200; the same year some interior updates were introduced, including seats with retractable headrests and a new dashboard. In 1972, Maserati added the Indy 4900 to the range, equipped with the new 4.9-litre V8.

Production of the Indy ended in 1975. In total 1,104 were produced, 440 of them were Indy 4200s, 364 were Indy 4700s and 300 were Indy 4900s.

== Specifications ==
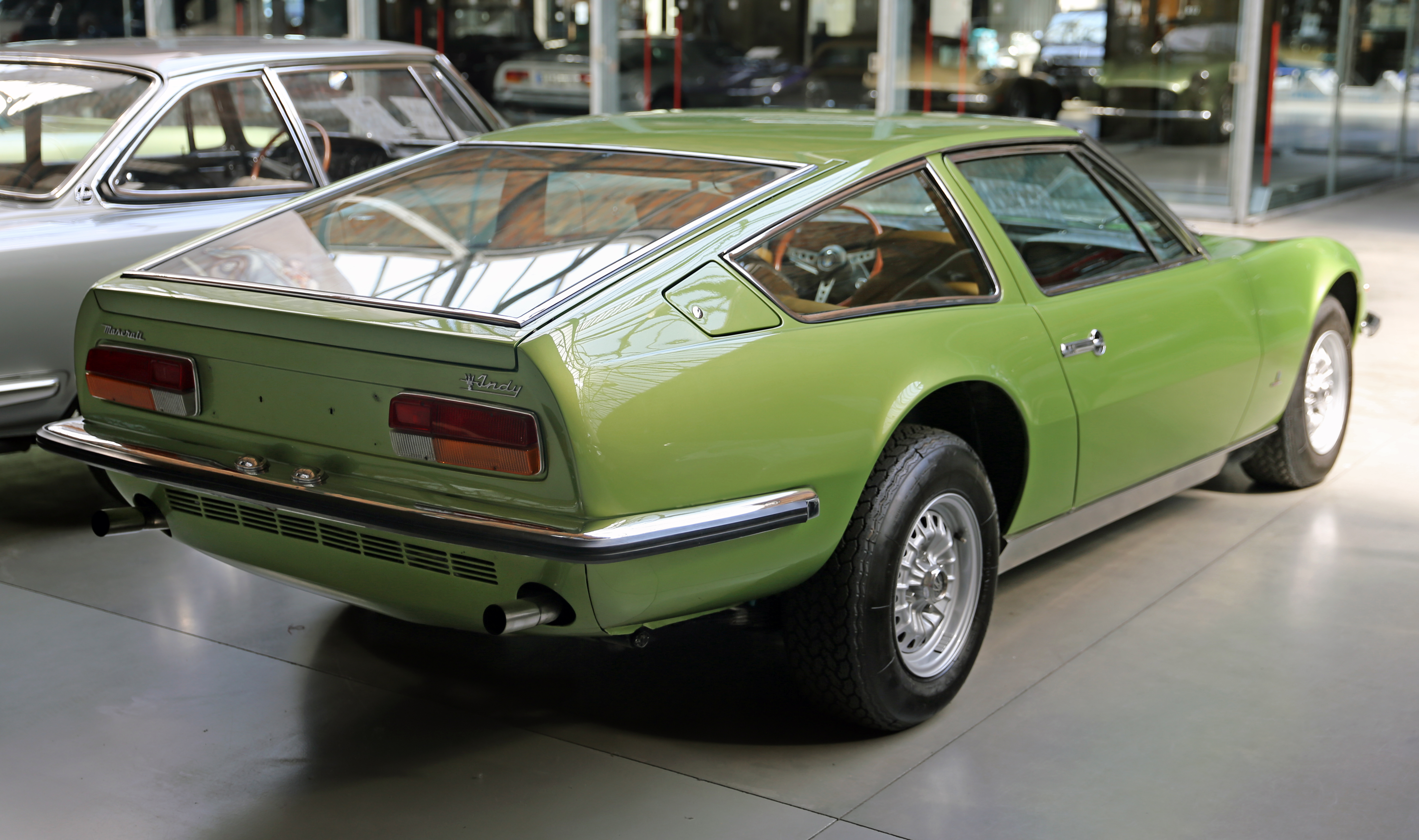
1970 Maserati Indy 4200

The Indy used unibody construction. The suspension layout was shared with the Ghibli. At the front there were double wishbones, with coaxial hydraulic dampers and coil springs, and an anti-roll bar. At the rear there was a live axle with semi-elliptic springs, a single longitudinal torque arm, hydraulic dampers and an anti-roll bar. Brakes were vented and servo-assisted discs on all four wheels. The engines were Maserati's own all-aluminium, four overhead cam Tipo 107 V8 family, and were fed by four Weber 42 DCNF twin-choke carburettors; they had a wet sump, and were thus related but different from the higher output, dry sump Tipo 115 units of the flagship Ghibli.
