= Virginio Vairo =

Italian automobile designer

Virginio Vairo is an Italian automobile designer who has collaborated with Carrozzeria Vignale.

== Designs ==
- 1964 Fiat 1300 and 1500 Sportiva fastback.
- 1964 Fiat 850 Coupé, Spider, Berlina (derived from Giovanni Michelotti designs).
- 1965 Fiat 1500 Coupé (derived from Giovanni Michelotti designs).
- 1965 Maserati Mexico prototype, based on a Maserati 5000 GT chassis.
- 1966 Maserati Mexico
- 1967 Fiat 125 Coupé Samantha
- 1967 Fiat 124 Coupé Eveline
- 1967 Jensen Nova concept car
- 1968 Matra M530 Sport Vignale prototype
- 1968 Maserati Indy
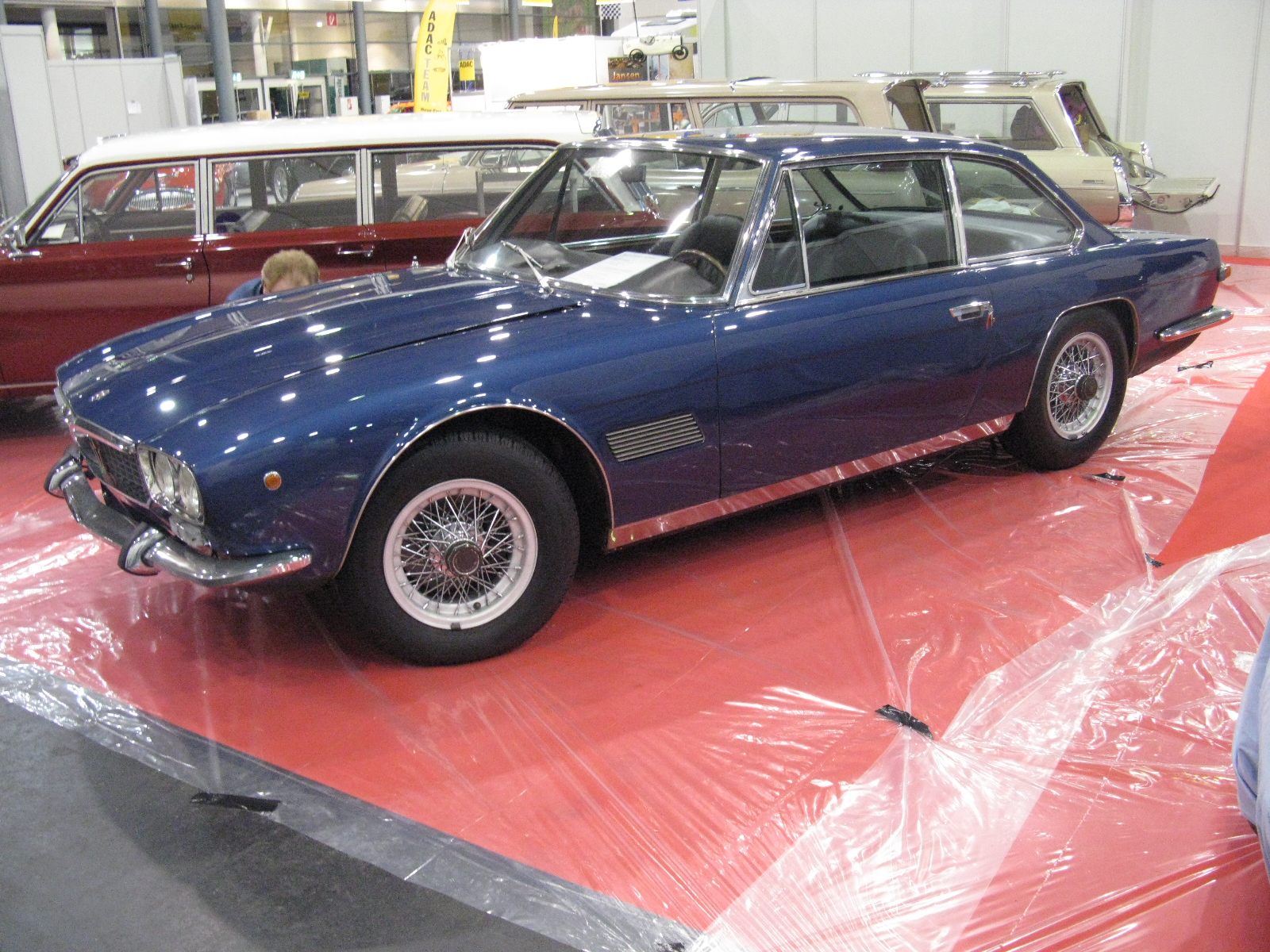
Maserati Mexico

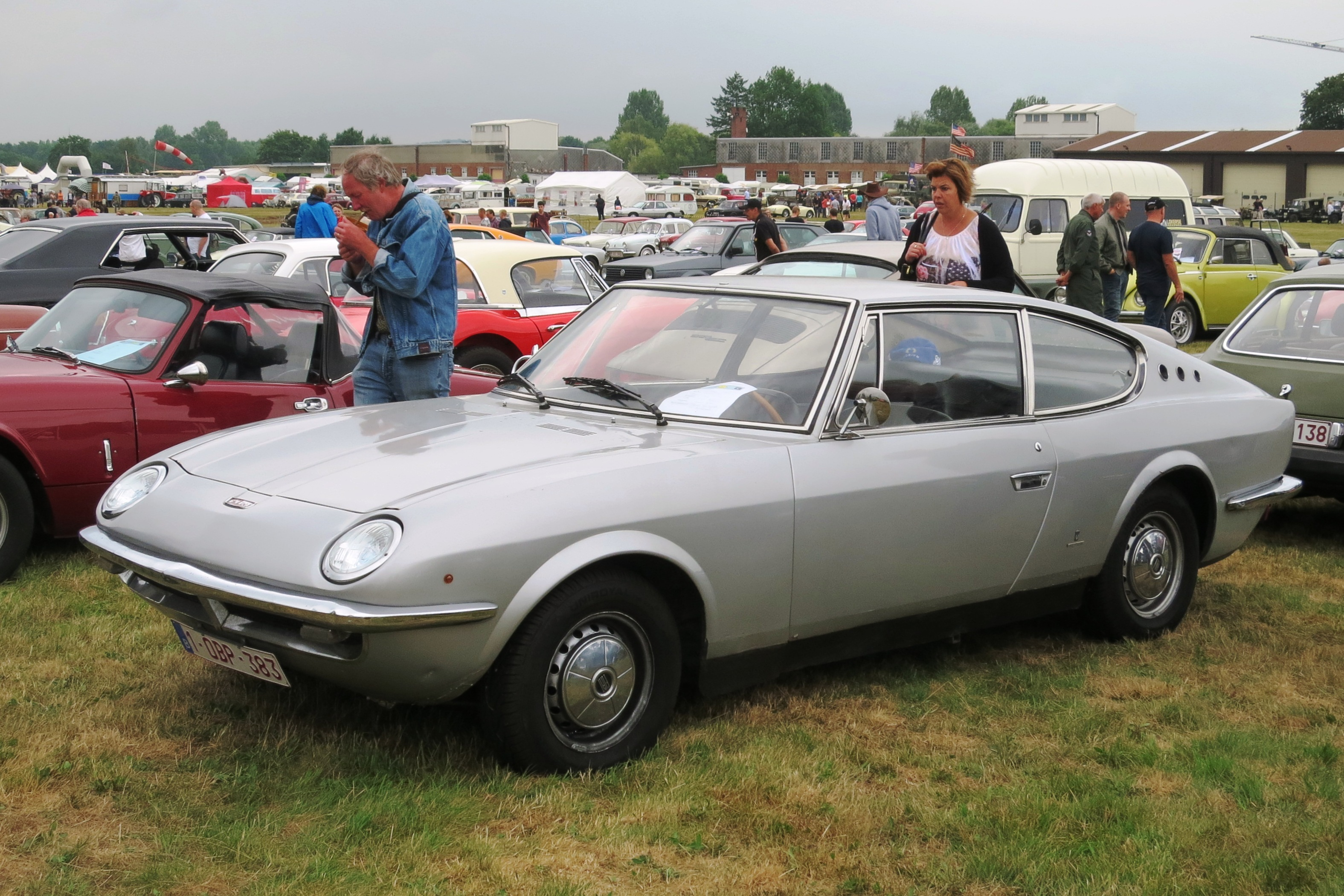
Fiat Vignale Samantha

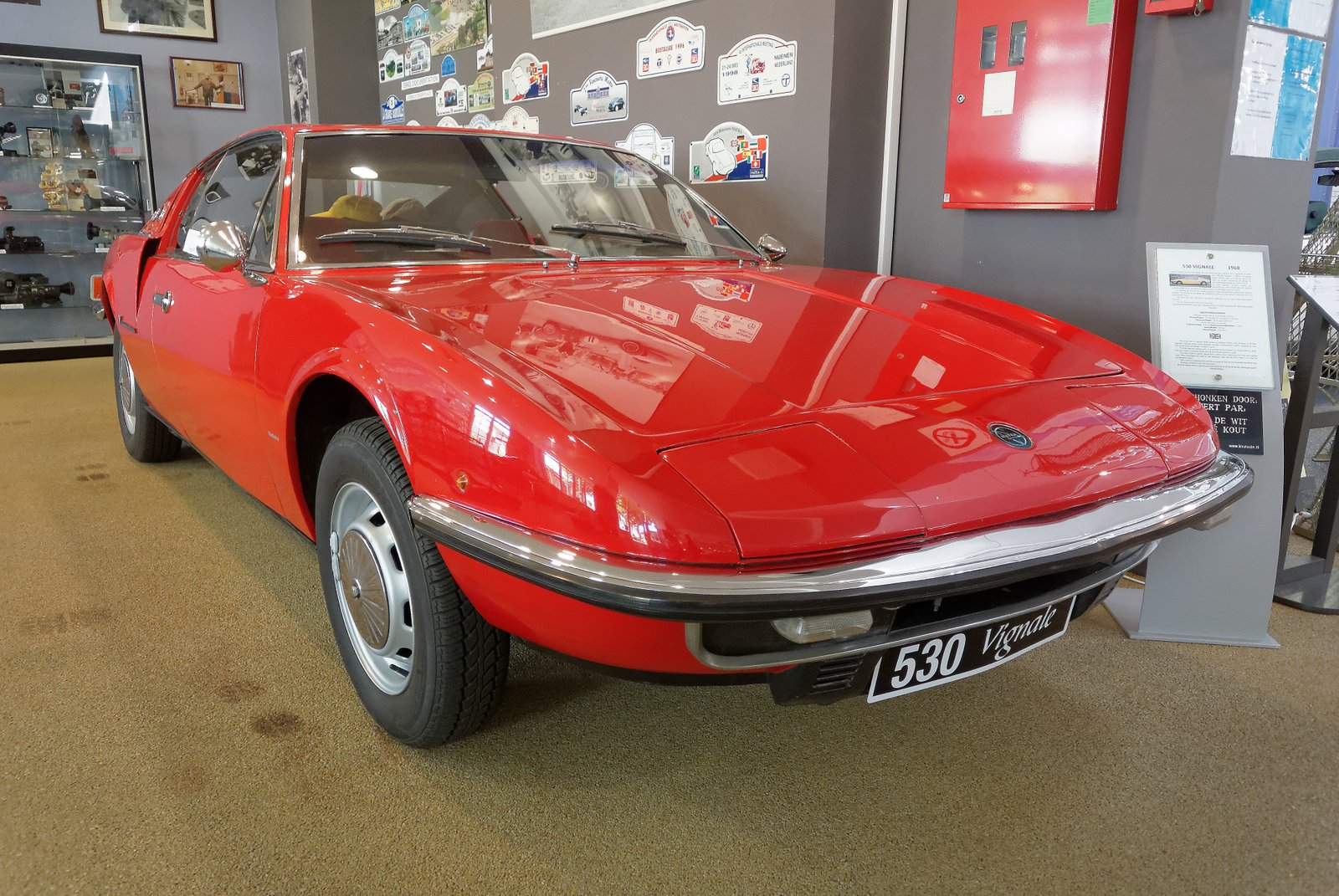
Matra M530 Sport Vignale

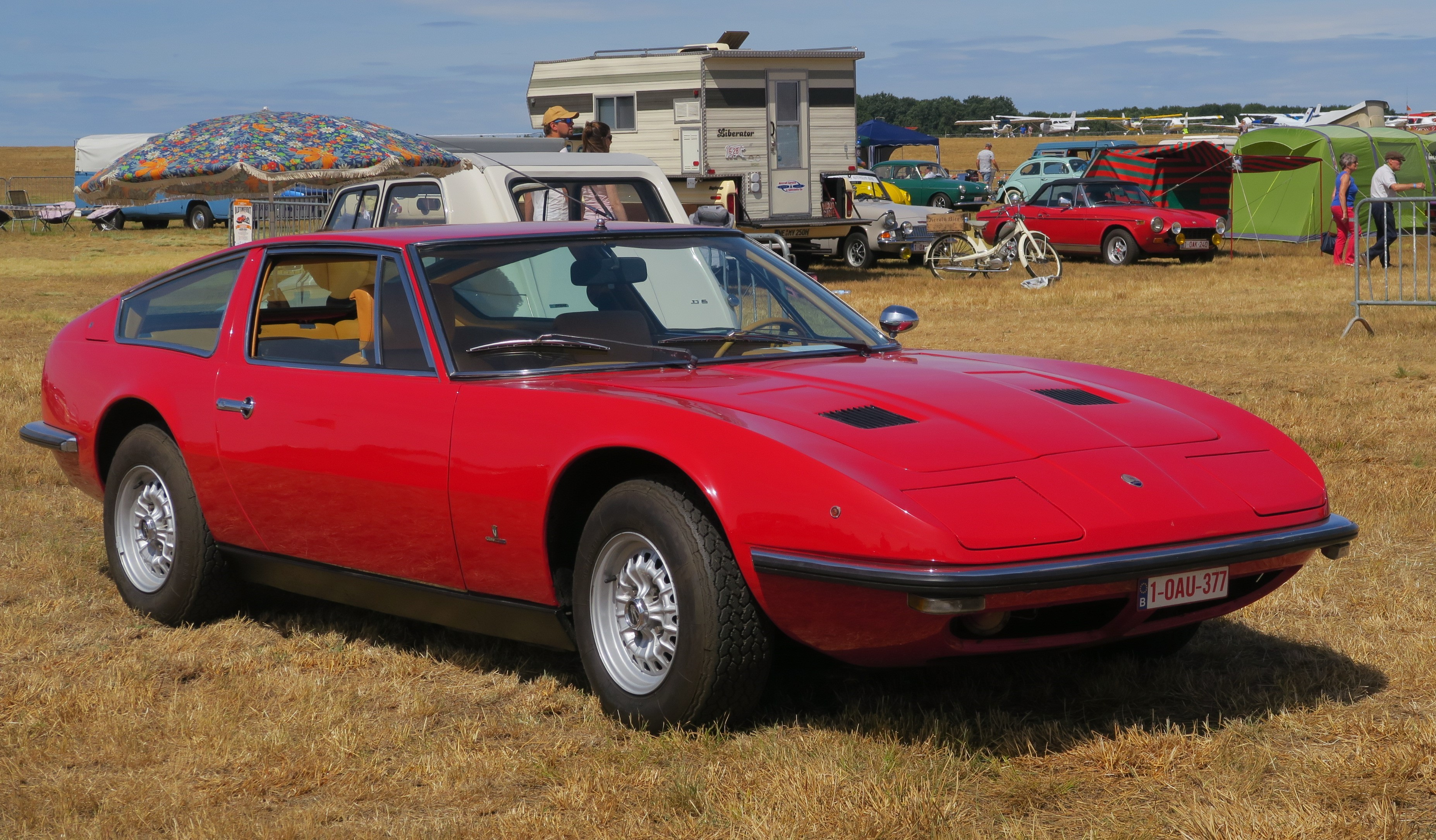
Maserati Indy
