= Maserati Mexico =

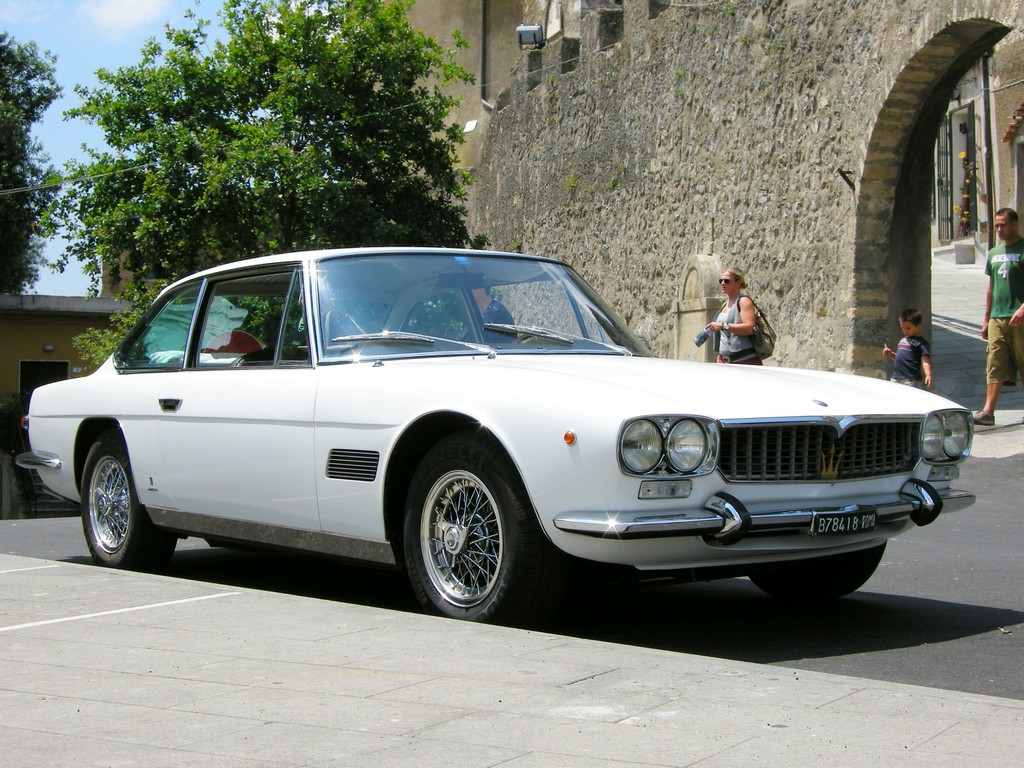

Overview
- Manufacturer: Maserati
- Production: 1966–1972
- Assembly: Italy: Modena
- Designer: Virginio Vairo at Vignale

Body and chassis
- Class: Grand tourer (S)
- Body style: 2-door, 4-seat coupé
- Layout: Front-engine, rear-wheel-drive
- Related: Maserati Quattroporte (AM107)

Powertrain
- Engine: 4.2 L Tipo 107 V8; 4.7 L Tipo 107/1 V8
- Transmission: 5-speed ZF S5-20 manual (4.2); 5-speed ZF S5-325 manual (4.7); 3-speed Borg Warner automatic

Dimensions
- Wheelbase: 2,640 mm (103.9 in)
- Length: 4,760 mm (187.4 in)
- Width: 1,720 mm (67.7 in)
- Height: 1,360 mm (53.5 in)
- Kerb weight: 1,830 kg (4,034 lb) (dry)

Chronology
- Successor: Maserati Kyalami

The Maserati Mexico (Tipo AM112) is a 4-seater grand touring coupé produced by Italian automobile manufacturer Maserati between 1966 and 1972. It was based on the second series of the original AM107 Maserati Quattroporte, and it was powered by the same 4.2 and 4.7 L V8 engines.

== History ==
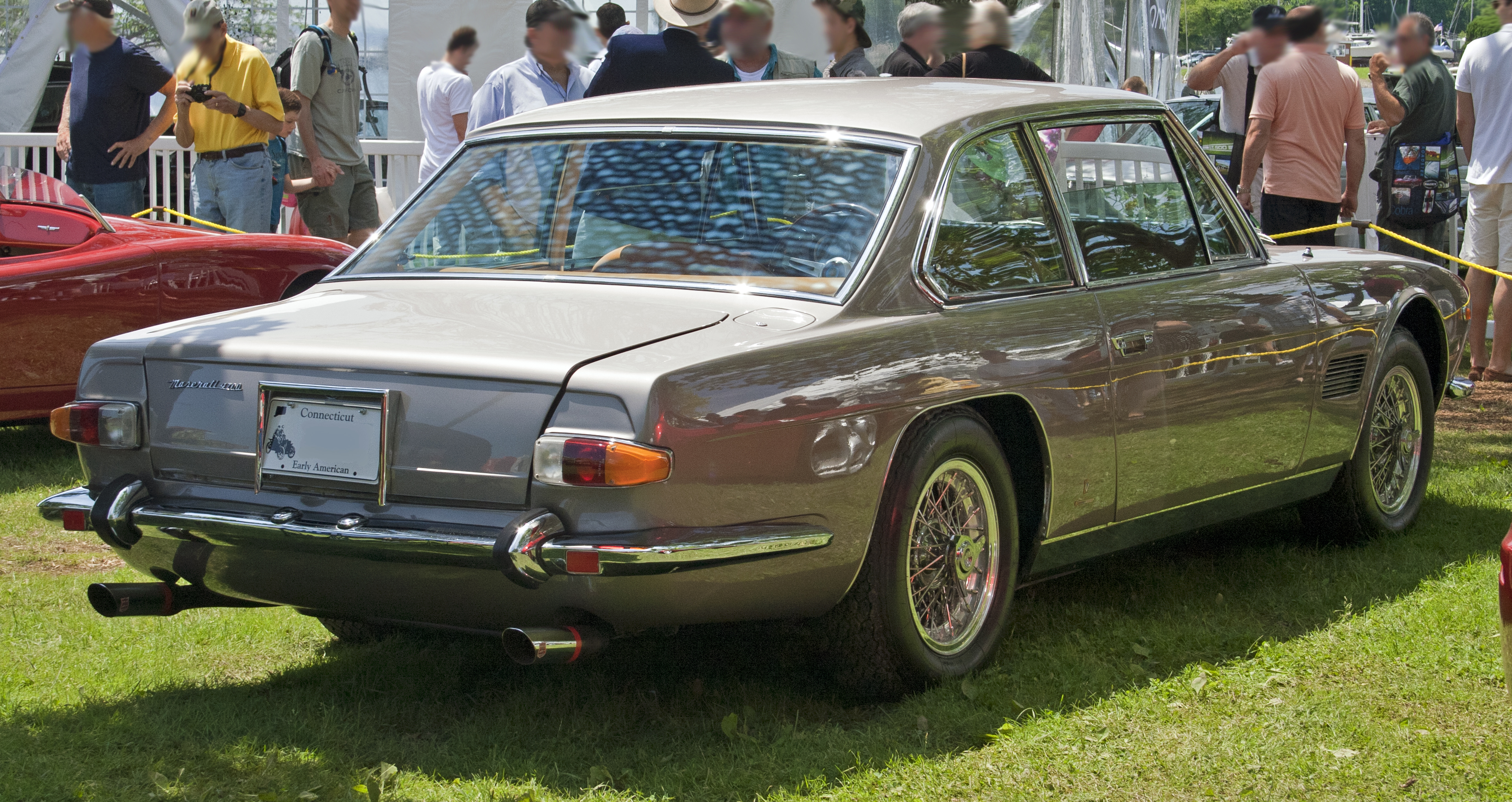
Rear view

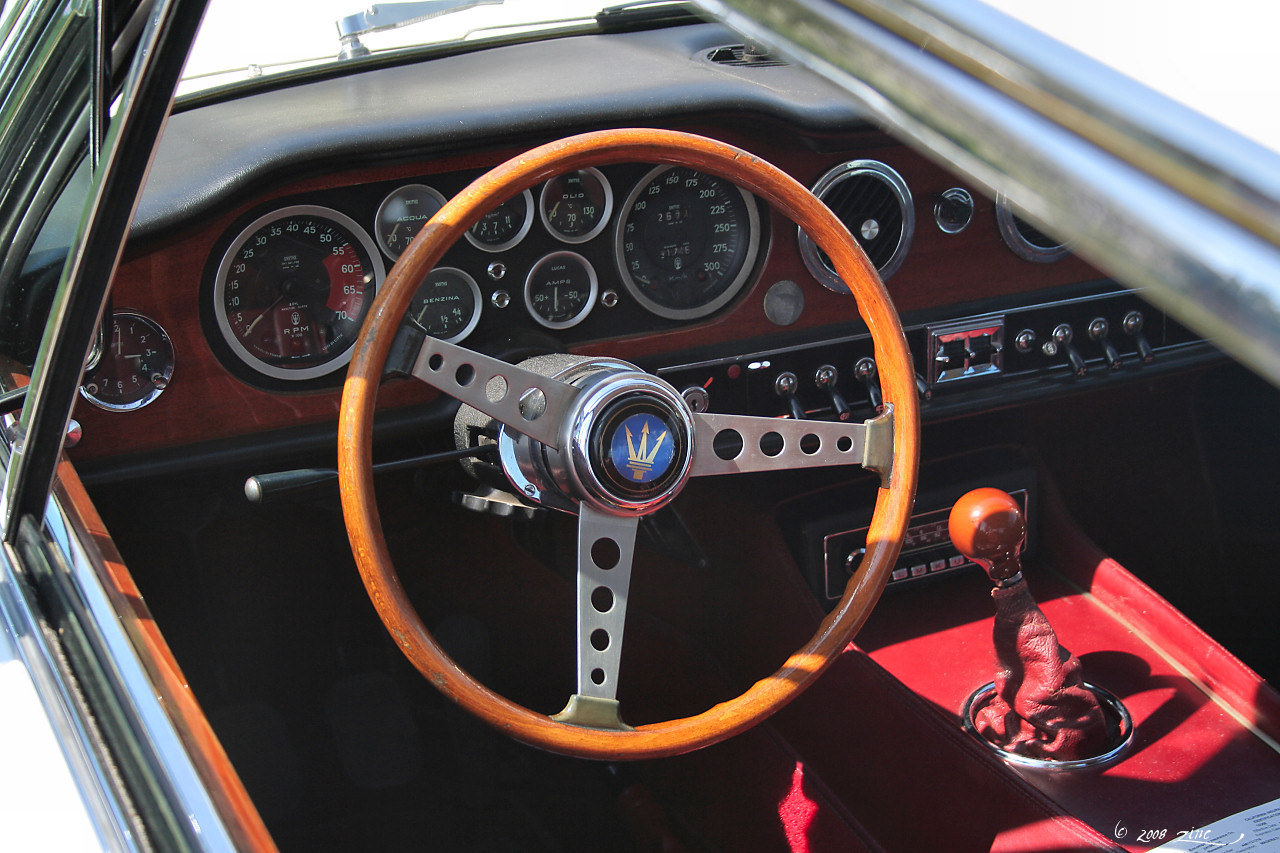
Interior

The Maserati Mexico's design derived from a 2+2 prototype bodywork by Virginio Vairo shown on the Vignale stand at the October 1965 Salone di Torino and built upon a 4.9-litre 5000 GT chassis, rebodied after it had been damaged. As the car after the show was sold to Mexican president Adolfo López Mateos, the model became known as the Mexico. By coincidence, John Surtees won the Mexican Grand Prix on a Cooper-Maserati T81 the following year. Vignale's prototype was so well received that Maserati immediately made plans to put a version into production.

The production Maserati Mexico debuted in August 1966 at the 20° Concorso internazionale di eleganza per auto in Rimini, while its international première was at the October Paris Motor Show. It was built on the chassis of the first generation of the Quattroporte with a wheelbase shortened by 11 cm (4.3 in).

Originally powered by a 4.7-litre 90° V8 fed by four twin-choke 38 DCNL5 Weber carburetors that was rated at 290 hp, the car managed to turn out a top speed between 240–250 km/h (149–155 mph). In 1969, however, contrary to Maserati tradition, the Mexico was also made available with a smaller, 4.2-litre V8 engine.

Apart from the smaller engine option the Mexico underwent few changes during its production life span. Its luxurious interior included a rich leather seating for four adults, electric windows, wooden dashboard, iodine headlights and air conditioning as standard. Automatic transmission, power steering and a radio were available as optional extras. The 4.7-litre version was fitted with 650x15" Borrani chrome wire wheels and the 4.2-litre version with steel disc wheels. When leaving the factory all Maserati Mexicos originally fitted Pirelli Cinturato 205VR15 tyres (CN72). The Mexico was the first production Maserati to be fitted with servo assisted ventilated disc brakes on all four wheels.

In May 1967, under commission from the German concessionnaire Auto Koenig for one client, Herr Rupertzhoven, Maserati built a one-off Mexico similar to Vignale's original prototype design but it was the work of Frua. Appearing like a 4-seat Mistral and built on the same tubular chassis as the 3500 GT (2600 mm wheelbase), this prototype 'Mexico' was fitted with the Mistral's six-cylinder 3.7-litre Lucas fuel-injected engine. It was finished in Oro Longchamps with a black leather interior. Its dashboard came from the Quattroporte.

485 Mexicos were produced, 175 equipped with the 4.7-litre engine and 305 with the 4.2-litre engine.
