= Giulia =

Giulia may refer to:

== People ==
- Giulia (given name)
- Giulia (wrestler) (born 1994), English-born Italian-Japanese professional wrestler

== Places ==
- Cappella Giulia, a chapel in St. Peter's Basilica, Rome
- Friuli-Venezia Giulia, one of the 20 regions of Italy
  - Friuli Venezia Giulia Airport, an airport near Trieste
  - Il Quotidiano del Friuli Venezia Giulia, a free newspaper 2011–14
- Milano Santa Giulia, a green and residential district (quartiere) in Milan, Italy
- Santa Giulia (Brescia), Lombardy, a former monastery
- Santa Giulia, Lucca, a church
- Valle Giulia, a valley near Rome
  - Battle of Valle Giulia, a violent confrontation between demonstrators and police in 1968
  - Fountain of Valle Giulia
- Venezia Giulia, an area of southeastern Europe, today split among Croatia, Italy and Slovenia
  - Venezia Giulia Police Force, operational 1945–1961
- Via Giulia, a street in the historic centre of Rome
  - Santa Caterina da Siena a Via Giulia, a church on Via Giulia
- Villa Giulia, Rome, home of the National Etruscan Museum
- Villa Giulia, Naples, a historic villa
- Villa Giulia, Palermo, a park
  - Fontana del Genio a Villa Giulia, a fountain in Palermo

== Transport ==
- Alfa Romeo Giulia, a large family car of the 1960s and 1970s
- Alfa Romeo Giulia TZ, a sports car manufactured between 1963 and 1967
- Alfa Romeo Giulia (952), a compact executive car introduced in 2016
- SS Santa Giulia, an Empire-class ship built in 1944, originally named Empire Bute

== Film and television ==
- Disperatamente Giulia (Julia Forever), a 1989 Italian romance-drama mini series
- Giulia Doesn't Date at Night (Italian: Giulia non esce la sera), a 2009 Italian drama film
- The Legendary Giulia and Other Miracles (Italian: Noi e la Giulia), a 2015 Italian comedy film

== See also ==
- Giulietta (disambiguation)
- Giulio (disambiguation)
- Guilia
- Julia (disambiguation)
- Juliet (disambiguation)
