= Giulia (given name) =

Giulia is the Italian version of the feminine given name Julia. The corresponding Italian male name is Giulio. People with that name include:

== People ==
- Giulia (born 1994), English-born Italian-Japanese professional wrestler
- Santa Giulia da Corsica (died c. 439), Christian saint and martyr
- Giulia Anghelescu (born 1984), Romanian singer
- Giulia Arcioni (born 1986), Italian sprinter who competed in the 2008 Summer Olympics
- Giulia Arena (born 1994), Italian beauty queen, television presenter and model
- Giulia Bevilacqua (born 1979), Italian film, stage and television actress
- Giulia Boschi (born 1962), Italian film and television actress
- Giulia Botti (born 1980), Italian ski mountaineer and triathlete
- Giulia Casoni (born 1978), Italian tennis player
- Maria Giulia Confalonieri (born 1993), Italian track and road racing cyclist
- Giulia Conti (born 1985), Italian sailor who competed in the 2004, 2008 and 2012 Summer Olympics
- Giulia Maria Crespi (1923–2020), Italian media proprietor
- Giulia Crostarosa (1696–1755), Italian Roman Catholic nun who founded the Order of Redemptoristine Nuns
- Giulia de' Medici (c. 1535–c. 1588), illegitimate daughter of Alessandro de' Medici
- Giulia della Rena (1319–1367), Italian Roman Catholic professed member of the Order of Saint Augustine
- Giulia della Rovere (1531–1563), Italian noblewoman whose portrait was painted by Titian
- Giulia Di Nunno (born 1973), Italian mathematician
- Giulia Domenichetti (born 1984), Italian footballer
- Giulia Donato (born 1992), Italian professional racing cyclist
- Giulia Enrica Emmolo (born 1991), Italian water polo player
- Giulia Enders (born 1990), German writer and scientist
- Giulia Farnese (1474–1524), mistress of Pope Alexander VI
- Giulia Masucci Fava (1858–after 1891), Italian painter
- Giulia Civita Franceschi (1870–1957), Italian educator
- Giulia Galtarossa (born 1991), Italian rhythmic gymnast
- Giulia Gam (born 1966), Italian-born Brazilian actress
- Giulia Gatto-Monticone (born 1987), Italian professional tennis player
- Giulia Gonzaga (1513–1566), Italian noblewoman
- Giulia Elettra Gorietti (born 1988), Italian actress
- Giulia Gorlero (born 1990), Italian water polo goalkeeper
- Giulia Grisi (1811–1869), Italian operatic soprano
- Giulia Rambaldi Guidasci (born 1986), Italian water polo player who competed at the 2012 Summer Olympics
- Giulia Jones (born 1980), Australian politician
- Giulia Lacedelli (born 1971), Italian curler
- Giulia Lama (c. 1681–after 1753), Italian painter,
- Giulia Lapi (born 1985), Italian synchronized swimmer who competed in the 2008 and 2012 Summer Olympics
- Giulia Lazzarini (born 1934), Italian actress
- Giulia Lorenzoni (born 1940), Italian fencer who competed at the 1968, 1972 and 1976 Summer Olympics
- Giulia Luzi (born 1994), Italian actress, singer, and dubbing voice actor
- Giulia Manfrini (1988–2024), Italian surfer
- Giulia Marletta (active from 2000), Italian-born film producer, director, and entertainment executive
- Giulia Melucci (born 1966), American writer
- Giulia Michelini (born 1985), Italian actress
- Giulia Moi (born 1971), Italian Member of the European Parliament
- Giulia Molinaro (born 1990), Italian professional golfer
- Giulia Momoli (born 1981), Italian beach volleyball player
- Giulia Murada (born 1998), Italian ski mountaineer
- Giulia Niccolai (1934–2021), Italian photographer, poet, novelist and translator
- Giulia Novelli (1859–1932), Italian operatic mezzo-soprano
- Giulia Pennella (born 1989), Italian hurdler
- Giulia Quintavalle (born 1983), Italian judoka who a gold medal at the 2008 Summer Olympics
- Giulia Recli (1890–1970), Italian composer and essayist
- Giulia Riva (born 1992), Italian sprinter
- Giulia Rizzi (born 1989), Italian fencer
- Giulia Rondon (born 1987), Italian professional volleyball player who competed in the 2012 Summer Olympics
- Giulia Rubini (born 1935), Italian actress
- Giulia Salzano (1846–1929), Italian Roman Catholic professed religious, canonized 2010
- Giulia Sergas (born 1979), Italian professional golfer
- Giulia Siegel (AKA Giulia Legeis, born 1974), German model
- Giulia Steingruber (born 1994), Swiss artistic gymnast
- Giulia Tofana (died 1659), Italian professional poisoner
- Giulia Turco (1848–1912), Italian noblewoman, naturalist and writer
- Giulia Valle (1847–1916), Italian Roman Catholic nun and professed member of the Sisters of Charity of Saint Joan Antida Thouret
- Giulia Villoresi (born 1984), Italian writer
- Giulia Viola (active from 2013), Italian middle-distance runner
- Giulia Warwick (1857–1904), English operatic soprano and actress

== Fictional Characters ==
- Giulia, a deleted character in the 2011 animated film Cars 2
- Giulia Marcovaldo, a character in the 2021 animated film Luca

== See also ==
- Giulia (disambiguation)
- Giulietta (disambiguation)
- Giulio (disambiguation)
- Guilia
- Julia (given name)
- Juliet (disambiguation)
