= Santa Giulia =

Santa Giulia may refer to:

== People ==
- Santa Giulia da Corsica (died c. 439), Christian saint and martyr
- Santa Giulia Salzano (1846-1929), Italian Roman Catholic professed religious, canonized 2010

== Places ==
- Milano Santa Giulia, a district of Milan, Italy
- Santa Giulia (Brescia), a monastery in Lombardy, Italy
- Santa Giulia, Lucca, a church

== Ships ==
- SS Santa Giulia, a ship in service with Lugari & Filippi, Italy from 1962 to 1970
