= Giulia Villoresi =

Italian writer (born 1984)

Giulia Villoresi (born 1984 in Rome) is an Italian writer best known for her book La Panzanella (Feltrinelli, 2009). She is graduated in Modern History and is currently working as a researcher for the university where she deals with religious history and Church's institutions. She lives in Rome.

== La Panzanella ==
La Panzanella (2009), the first book by Giulia Villoresi, tells the story of Carlotta, ugly duckling teenager. Among episodes, memories and thoughts the writer talks about the difficult growth and the constant search of love and beauty. Carlotta Cordelli named "Panzanella" or "Gnoccolona" because of his extra pounds, is a Roman girl of Neapolitan descent. Beautiful daughter of a fascinating mother and granddaughter of charming grandparents, she sees herself ugly, fat and clumsy and she feels excluded from the universe of its peers for its diversity: It is not only the physical to make it different, but also the uninterrupted flow of thoughts and reflections, between dream and philosophy accompanying the course of his days. The novel, as a sort of diary, recounts the life of Carlotta: the wickedness of the Nuns of the elementary school with the first sufferings and first rejects, the years of the middle school and the transformation of the body, the bitter discovery of sexuality, the desire to be different and anarchic, cigarettes smoked in secret, the Saturday night life, the holidays and the trip to Amsterdam, the one to Athens, the experience of death and torture, adventures with older boys, the attempts of losing weight, the Light Night in Rome, etc.. Then she will meet the true love, but it will not cure all the thoughts of the girl and her sense of inadequacy to the world. This love will be another piece of life that could help her to grow up.

"“Volevo essere adeguata ma non possedevo il segreto. La bellezza e l’amore erano le due cose a cui ancora pensavo di più”. ("I wanted to be appropriate, but I did not possess the secret. The beauty and love were the two things that I thought even more. ")

Carlotta is the emblem of a lazy, lonely and depressed generation, looking for something to believe which prevent her to recognize the value of the present. The author was able to tell with witty humor and an immediate style, typical of the thought, a story of hardship and passage from adolescence to adulthood. What most strikes the reader, however, is not so much the plot, but the depth and the appeal of philosophical observations that punctuate the novel.
