= Il Quotidiano del Friuli Venezia Giulia =

- Type: Free daily newspaper (published from Tuesday to Sunday)
- Founded: 2011
- Ceased publication: 2014
- Language: Italian
- Website: www.ilquotidianofvg.it

Il Quotidiano del Friuli Venezia Giulia (English: The Daily of Friuli Venezia Giulia) was an Italian free newspaper, founded in 2011. It was read only in Friuli-Venezia Giulia. The paper went defunct in 2014.
