= Alfa Romeo Giulia (2015) =

Italian compact executive sedan

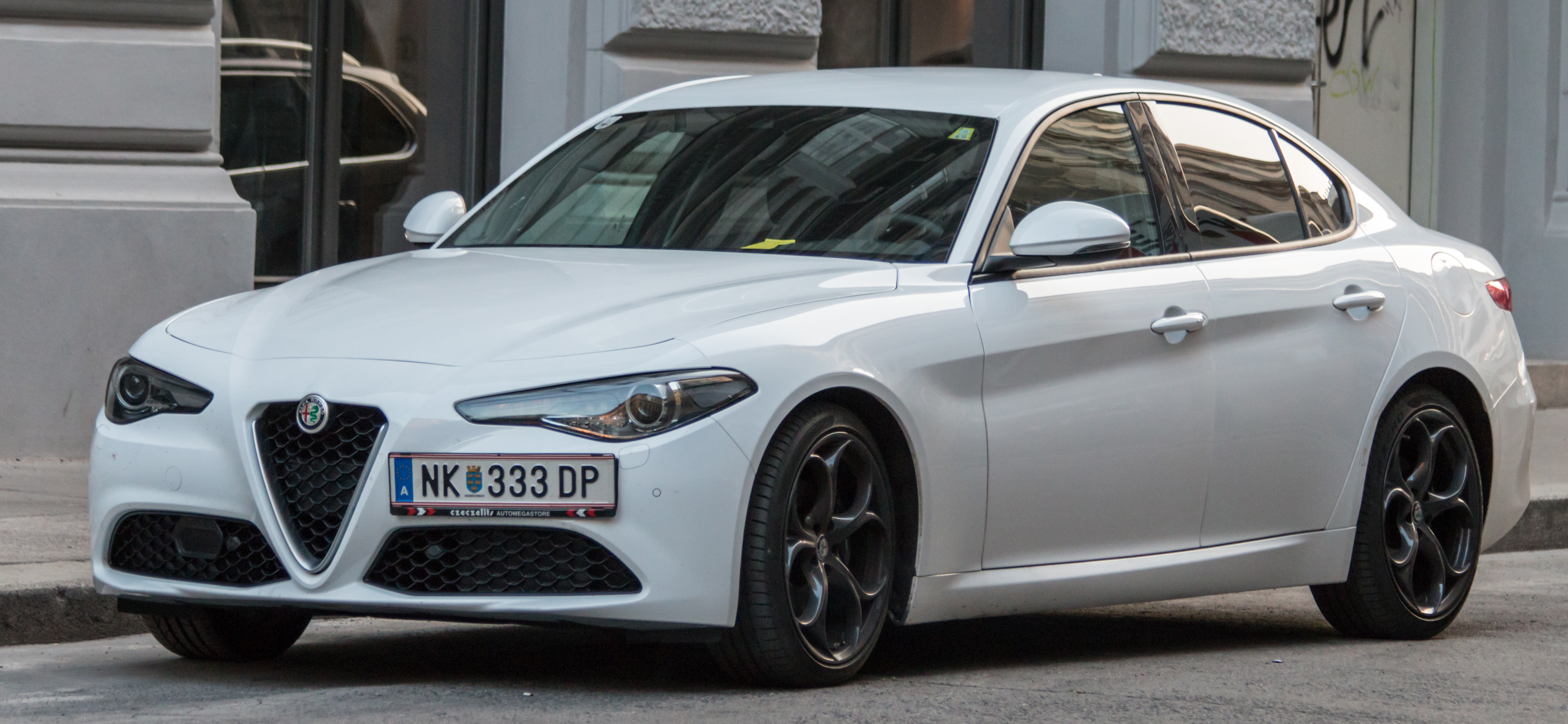
- 2018 Alfa Romeo Giulia

Overview
- Manufacturer: Alfa Romeo
- Model code: 952
- Production: 2015–present
- Model years: 2016–present
- Assembly: Italy: Piedimonte San Germano, Lazio (Cassino Plant)
- Designer: Marco Tencone at Centro Stile Alfa Romeo

Body and chassis
- Class: Compact executive car (D)
- Body style: 4-door saloon
- Layout: Front-engine, rear-wheel-drive/all-wheel-drive
- Platform: FCA Giorgio
- Related: Alfa Romeo Stelvio

Powertrain
- Engine: Petrol: 2.0 L FCA GME T4 Multiair turbo I4; 2.9 L 690T twin-turbo V6; Diesel: 2.2 L CNH Industrial JTDm Multijet II I4
- Transmission: 6-speed manual (Getrag G217); 6-speed manual (ZF S6-53, Quadrifoglio); 8-speed automatic (ZF 8HP50); 8-speed automatic (ZF 8HP75, Quadrifoglio)

Dimensions
- Wheelbase: 2,820 mm (111.0 in)
- Length: 4,639 mm (182.6 in)
- Width: 1,873 mm (73.7 in)
- Height: 1,426 mm (56.1 in)
- Kerb weight: 1,445 kg (3,186 lb) 2.2 diesel 1,645 kg (3,627 lb) 2.0 RWD; 1,660 kg (3,660 lb) 2.0 AWD; 1,734 kg (3,822 lb) Quadrifoglio

Chronology
- Predecessor: Alfa Romeo 159

The Alfa Romeo Giulia is a compact executive car produced by the Italian manufacturer Alfa Romeo. Known internally as the Type 952, it was unveiled in June 2015, with market launch scheduled for February 2016, and it is the first saloon offered by Alfa Romeo after the production of the 159 ended in 2011. The Giulia is also the first mass-market Alfa Romeo vehicle in over two decades to use a longitudinal rear-wheel drive platform, since the 75 which was discontinued in 1992. The Giulia was second in 2017 European Car of the Year voting and was named Motor Trend Car of the Year for 2018. In 2018, Giulia was awarded the Compasso d'Oro industrial design award.

== History ==
In 2013 Fiat Chrysler Automobiles CEO Sergio Marchionne requested a clean-sheet design for the next Alfa Romeo—a rear-wheel drive sports saloon to help return the company to its roots. He appointed former technical director at Ferrari and chassis engineer for the 458 Speciale Philippe Krief as chief engineer for the Giulia, and asked him to assemble a team of ten to create the Giulia, to be designed and built in two and a half years. Krief oversaw the development of the Giulia, along with the platform that underpins it—Giorgio. This is an all-new, longitudinal-engine, rear-wheel drive platform developed by Alfa Romeo.

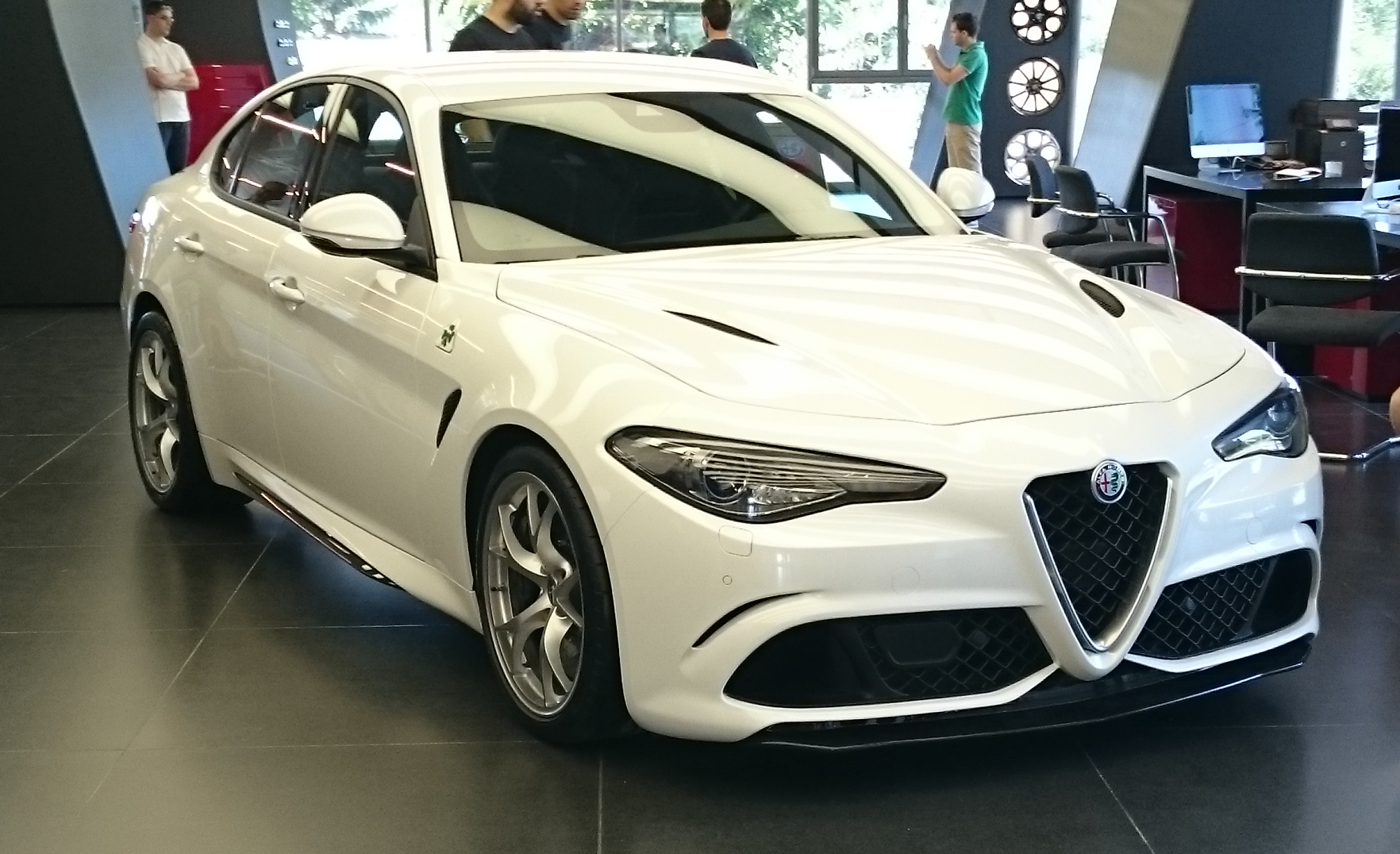
Pre-production Giulia Quadrifoglio at the Museo Storico Alfa Romeo

Marco Tencone of Centro Stile Alfa Romeo at the Fiat Mirafiori factory in Turin headed the design team, with oversight from Lorenzo Ramaciotti. The Giulia had a long gestation and delayed launch due to Marchionne sending its design back to the drawing board.

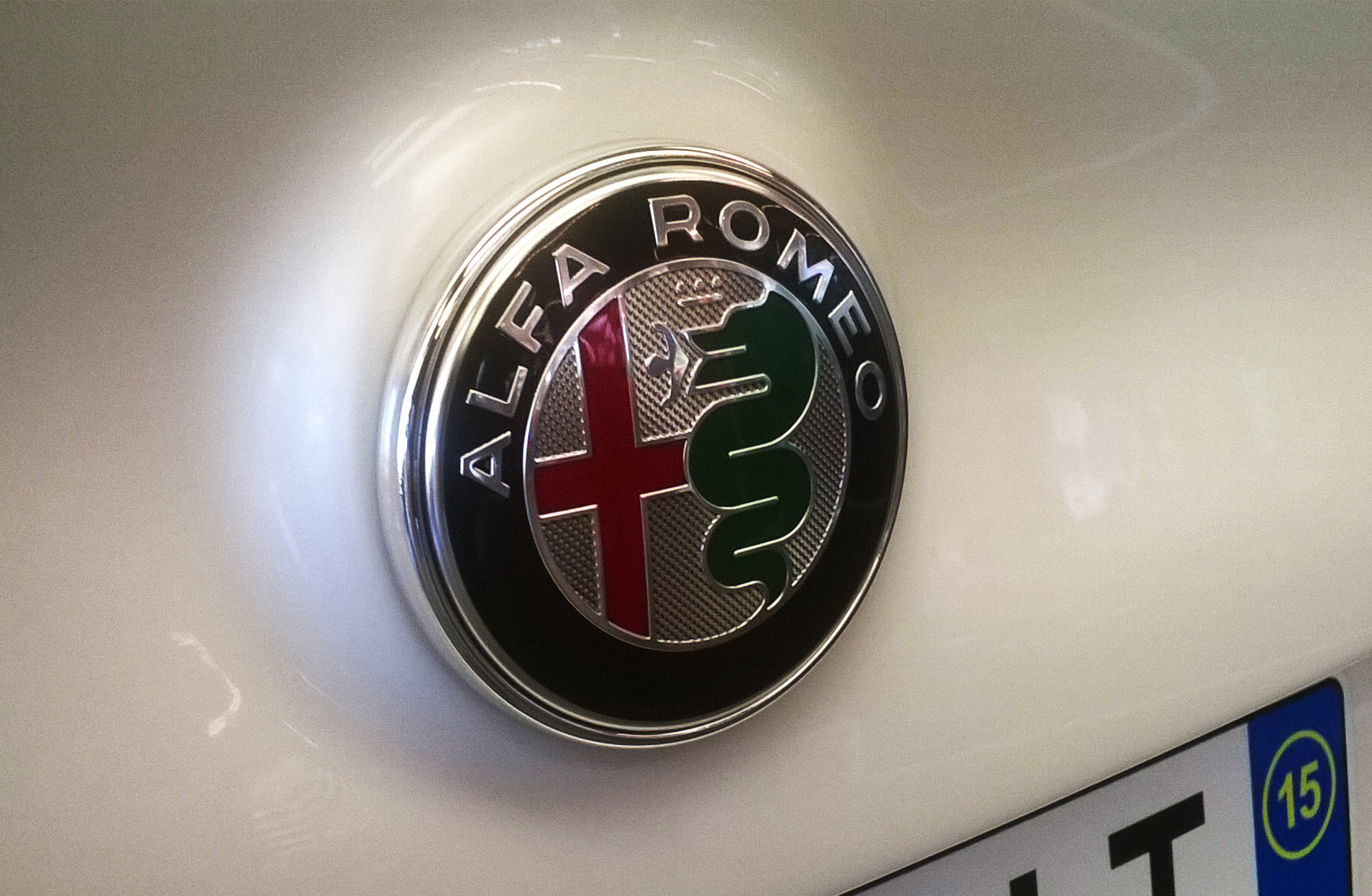
The restyled company logo, which debuted with the new Giulia

The new Giulia was unveiled to the press at the Museo Storico Alfa Romeo in Arese, on 24 June 2015, at an event which involved only the top-of-the-range Quadrifoglio variant and a rendition of "Nessun dorma" by Italian tenor Andrea Bocelli. The occasion coincided with the company's 105th anniversary, and also saw the company debut a restyled logo for all future Alfa Romeo models. The Giulia was also presented under the new La meccanica delle emozioni slogan ("the mechanics of emotions" in Italian).

The Giulia is the first model in the company's relaunch plan, which involves a €5 billion investment for an eight car line-up and a worldwide sales target of 400,000 by 2018—up from 74,000 in 2013.

== Overview ==
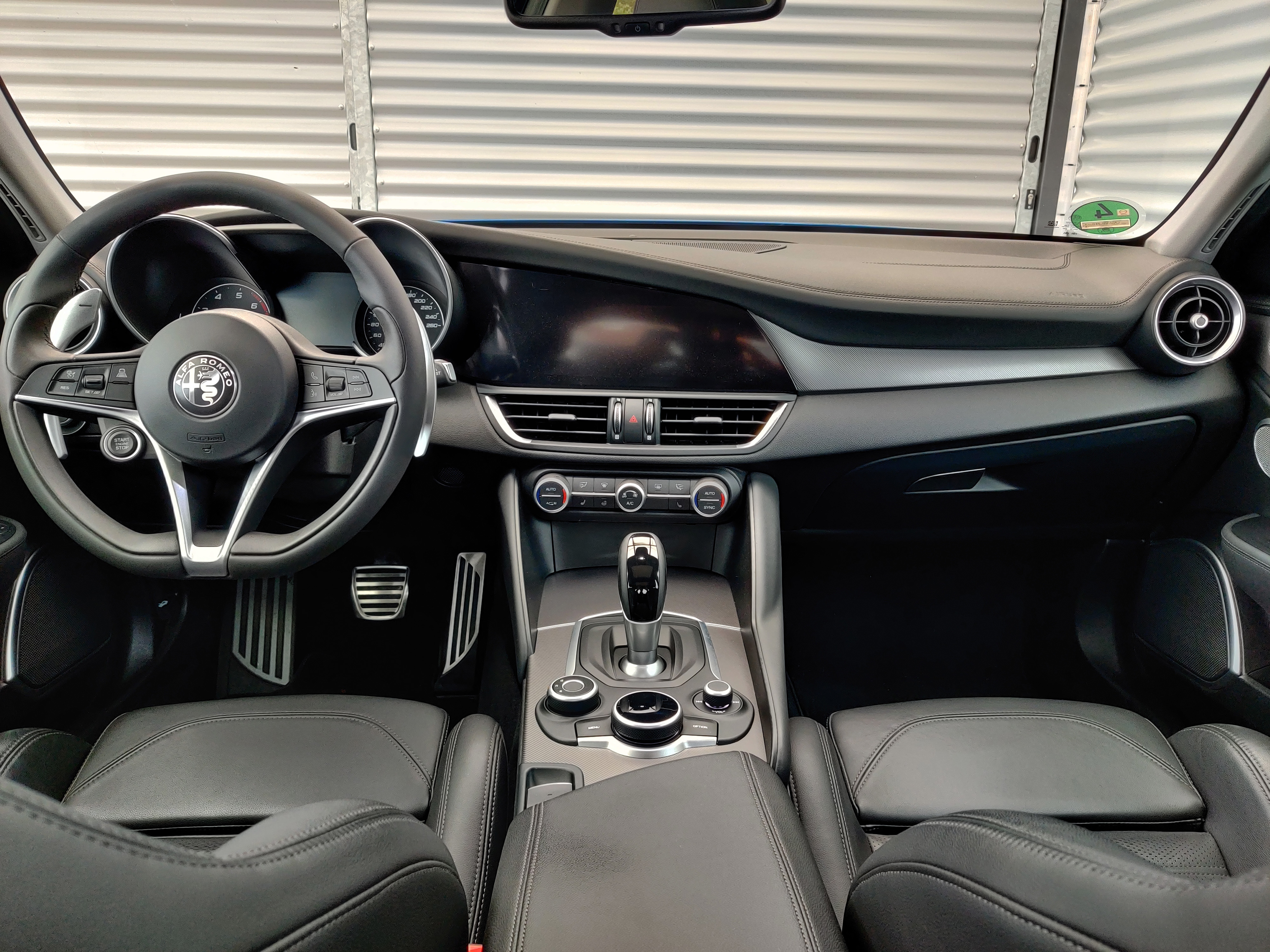
Interior

The Giulia uses a front-engine, rear-wheel-drive layout, targeting an even 50% front and 50% rear weight distribution. Suspension is independent all-around—double wishbone with a semi-virtual steering axis front and multilink rear. All Giulia models employ a carbon-fibre drive shaft made by Hitachi Automotive Systems, as well as aluminium alloy shock towers, suspension components, front wings, and doors. All-wheel drive is offered in non-Quadrifoglio models. The Giulia has a drag coefficient of Cd=0.28.

The Guardian, testing a two-litre petrol model, described the Giulia as a "midsize executive car" and "a counterpoint" to the Audi A4, BMW 3-Series and Mercedes-Benz C-Class. The Daily Telegraph, reviewing a Veloce Ti model fitted with the optional Performance Pack, called it a "sports saloon" and compared it "compact executive" competitors such as the Audi S4, BMW M340i, Mercedes-AMG C 43, and Jaguar XE S, noting that the Giulia was sold with what they considered a better warranty than those rival products. The Sunday Times compared the Quadrifoglio Verde model they reviewed to the BMW M3, and implied it to be "a mid-sized, four-door car". Regarding the exterior design, the Guardian said "lines flow from the shield-shaped grille past the unusual rimless headlamps and make the car appear elegantly stretched" before saying "the wedged tail is topped by a curvaceous lip and flat-topped lamps", while the Sunday Times criticised the driver's door, saying it "is either too small or in the wrong place."

The Guardian said that the driving experience was "lovely", while the Sunday Times said "it's an absolute joy to drive. The steering is fast — there are only two turns lock to lock" and that the optional carbon-ceramic disc brakes "were tuned perfectly." The Daily Telegraph described the steering as "remarkably quick, but without that artificial off-centre dartiness that’s so often engineered into modern steering systems." The Sunday Times said that the 58-litre (13 imp gal; 15 US gal) fuel tank is "not quite big enough" and that the 2.9-litre V6 engine in the model they reviewed is "smooth and magnificently sonorous".

Regarding the interior, The Sunday Times said "the quality of the interior fittings is not as good as you might expect" at the price point. They also found it hard to see which button on the steering wheel was which in dark conditions, and described the optional carbon front seats in their test car as "enormous" and "very comfortable" while noting that they limited space for rear passengers. The Guardian called it "generously luxurious." The Daily Telegraph said "the quality of the plastics used is still slightly behind those of its competitors" and "you never feel short of space in the front. The rear seats offer enough room, too" while noting that the switches and instruments are more intuitive than in previous Alfa Romeo models. The Independent, reviewing a Sprint model in 2021, made note of the updated centre-console screen, saying that it is "partly touch, partly operated by a rotary dial in the console, which is OK and probably safer than doing the whole thing like an iPad."

== Models ==
=== Giulia, Super, and Speciale ===
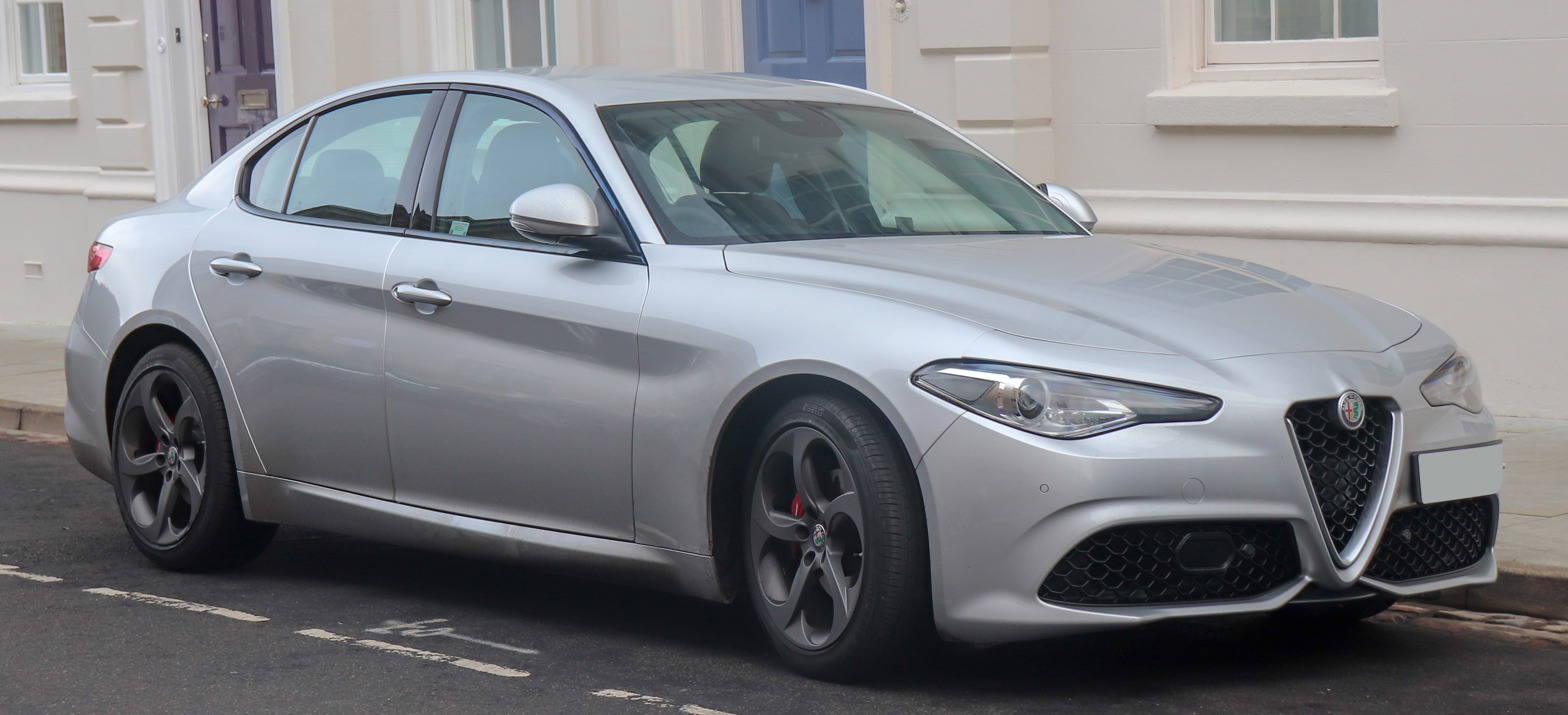
Giulia Speciale 2.2 TD

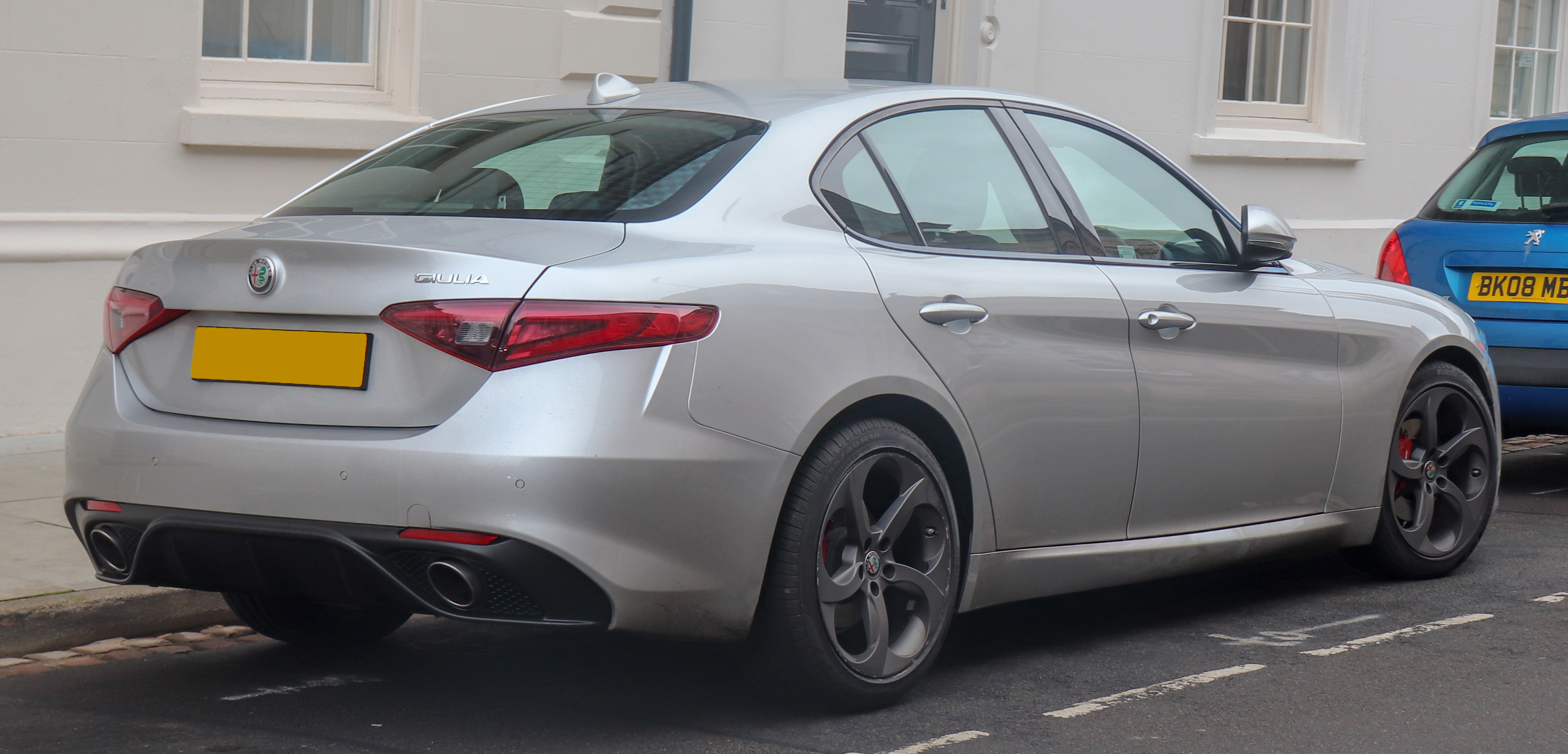
Giulia Speciale 2.2 TD

The base Giulia, mid-level Super, and fully loaded Speciale are powered by a 200 PS (147 kW; 197 hp) 2-litre gasoline engine, or the choice of 136 PS, 150 PS or 180 PS 2.2-litre turbo diesel engine. The base model comes with 16-inch alloys, the Super can be distinguished with 17-inch alloys and dual chrome exhaust tip for the diesel model. The Speciale has 18-inch alloys, black brake calipers, as well as leather sports seats and sporty bumpers from the Veloce. Fixed rear seat is standard on the base and Super, while the Speciale has folding rear seat.

=== Sprint ===
The Giulia Sprint is positioned above the base and Super model grades, but below the Ti and Veloce. In Europe, the early Giulia Sprint was powered by either the base 2.0 gasoline engine, or 180 PS 2.2-litre diesel engine. For 2020, the Sprint got the updated diesel engine with 190 PS. In North America, the Giulia Sprint was new for 2021 model year. It is the entry-level model although motored by the same engine as the Veloce. The diesel-powered Sprint was never offered in North America.

=== Ti and Veloce ===
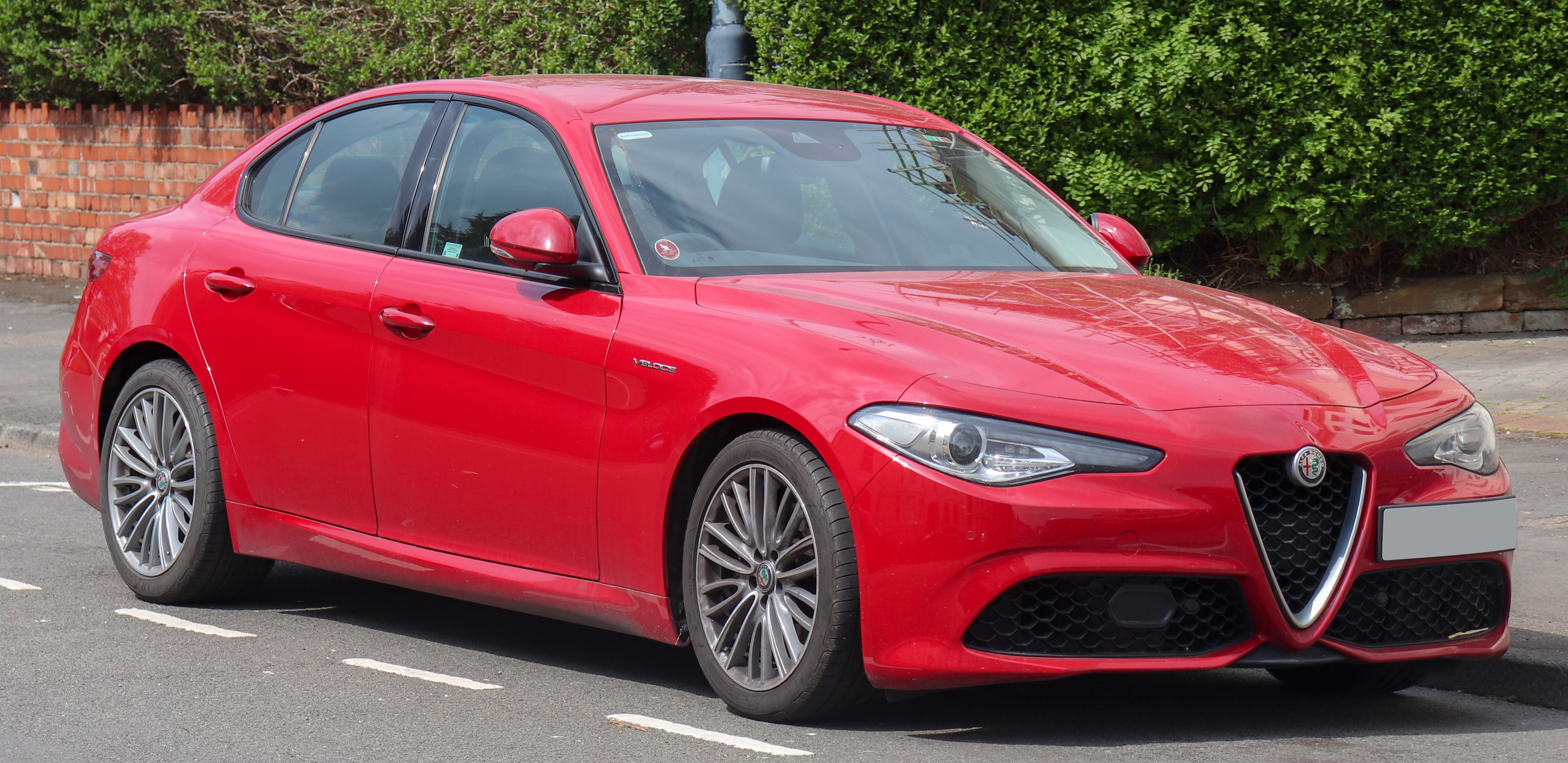
Giulia Veloce

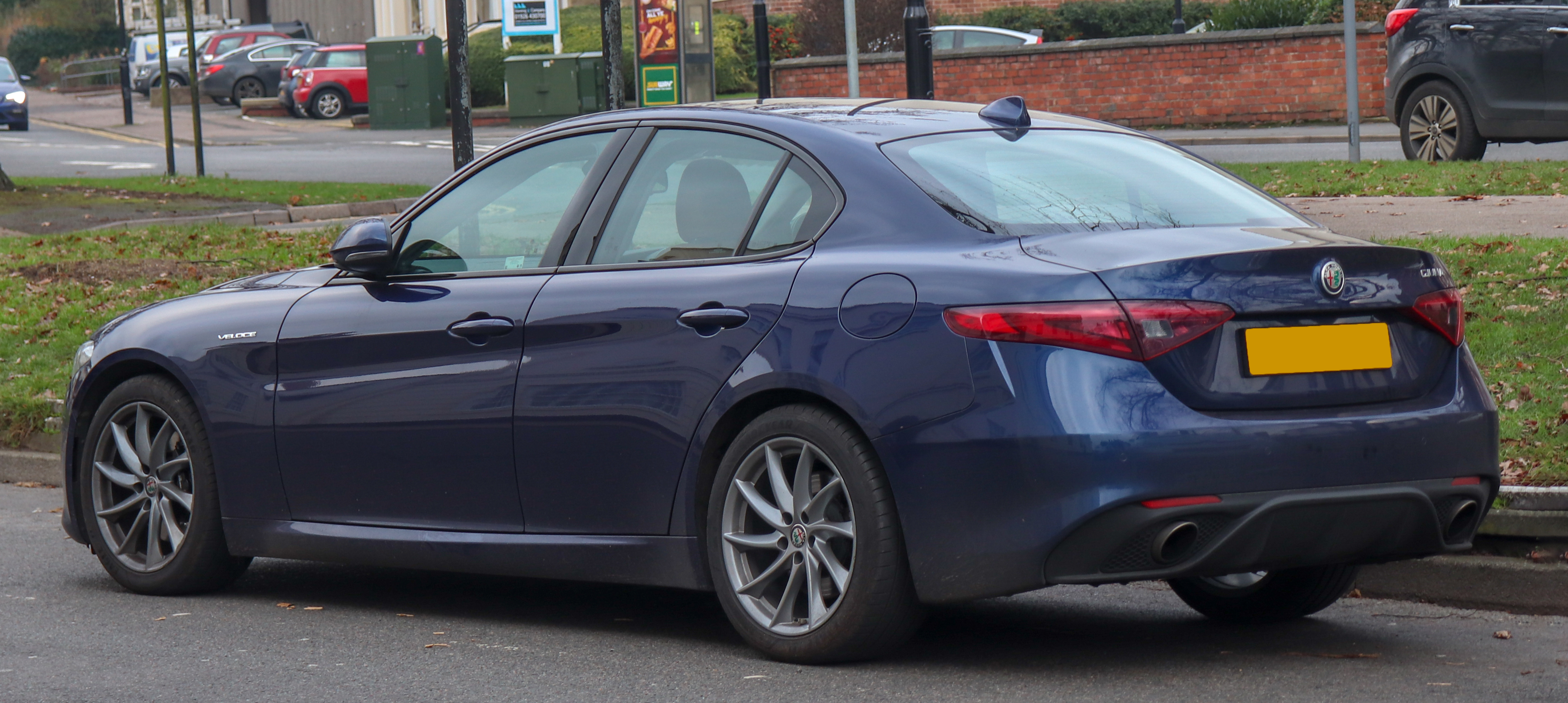
Giulia Veloce

The Giulia Veloce was presented at the 2016 Paris International Motor Show held in October. The Veloce offers the choice of two engines: the 2.0-litre turbo petrol and the 2.2-litre diesel inline-4 engines, both equipped with an 8-speed automatic transmission and Alfa Q4 all-wheel drive system (rear-wheel-drive in the UK).

The Veloce has specific bumpers and a glossy black door trim; it has also various performance components like special rear extractor with double exhaust pipes and optional 5-spoke 19-inch alloy wheels (the 19-inch option is not available in the UK). On the interior, it has black, red or tan leather sport seats and a sports steering wheel with a suede grip, aluminium inserts on the dashboard, central tunnel, door panels and Xenon headlights.

The new four-cylinder petrol engine is rated at a maximum power output of 280 PS (206 kW; 276 hp) at 5,250 rpm and a maximum torque of 400 N⋅m (295 lb⋅ft) at 2,250 rpm. It has MultiAir electro-hydraulic valve activation system along with "2-in-1" " turbocharger system and direct injection with a 200-bar high pressure system. The 210 PS (154 kW; 207 hp) diesel all aluminium straight-4 engine comes with MultiJet II technology and electrically operated variable geometry turbocharger.

The Alfa Q4 all wheel drive system behaves like a rear-wheel drive vehicle: 100% of torque is distributed to the rear axle. As it reaches the wheel adherence limit, the system transfers up to 60% of the torque to the front axle. To ensure maximum speed of response in re-distributing torque, the system exploits a high mechanical over slippage (up to 2.5%) between the two axles, which translates into segment-beating vehicle control in terms of traction and directional stability on bends.

Meanwhile, the Giulia Ti is the luxury-oriented version. It has chrome grille and window surrounds, heated steering wheel and front seats, wood panel interior, 18-inch alloy wheels, and headlight washers. Basically, it came with more features than the Sprint, but without paddle shift like in a Veloce. The North American Ti is powered by the 280 hp gasoline engine, while the European Ti was also offered with the 187 hp diesel engine. The Ti was also available with Lusso package which consists of Cannelloni leather interior, heated rear seat, and the choice of multi-spoke or optional "Y" shape 18-inch alloy wheels. With paddle shift, 19-inch 5-hole alloy wheels, sportier front and rear bumpers, the North American Ti Sport was roughly the equivalent of the Veloce, before it was officially called the Veloce for 2022 model year. The American Ti Sport Carbon or European Veloce Ti is basically the Veloce with carbon fiber mirror caps and body kits.

Based on the Veloce, the Estrema was released in 2022 for 2023 model year. It came with standard active suspension, 19-inch alloy wheels, "Estrema" side emblems, Alcantara with red stitching seats, dashboard, steering wheel and shift knob, and 14-speakers Harman Kardon sound system. The Giulia Estrema is offered with either 280 PS gasoline engine, or 210 PS diesel engine matched to 8-speed automatic gearbox and Q4 all-wheel-drive system.

=== Quadrifoglio ===
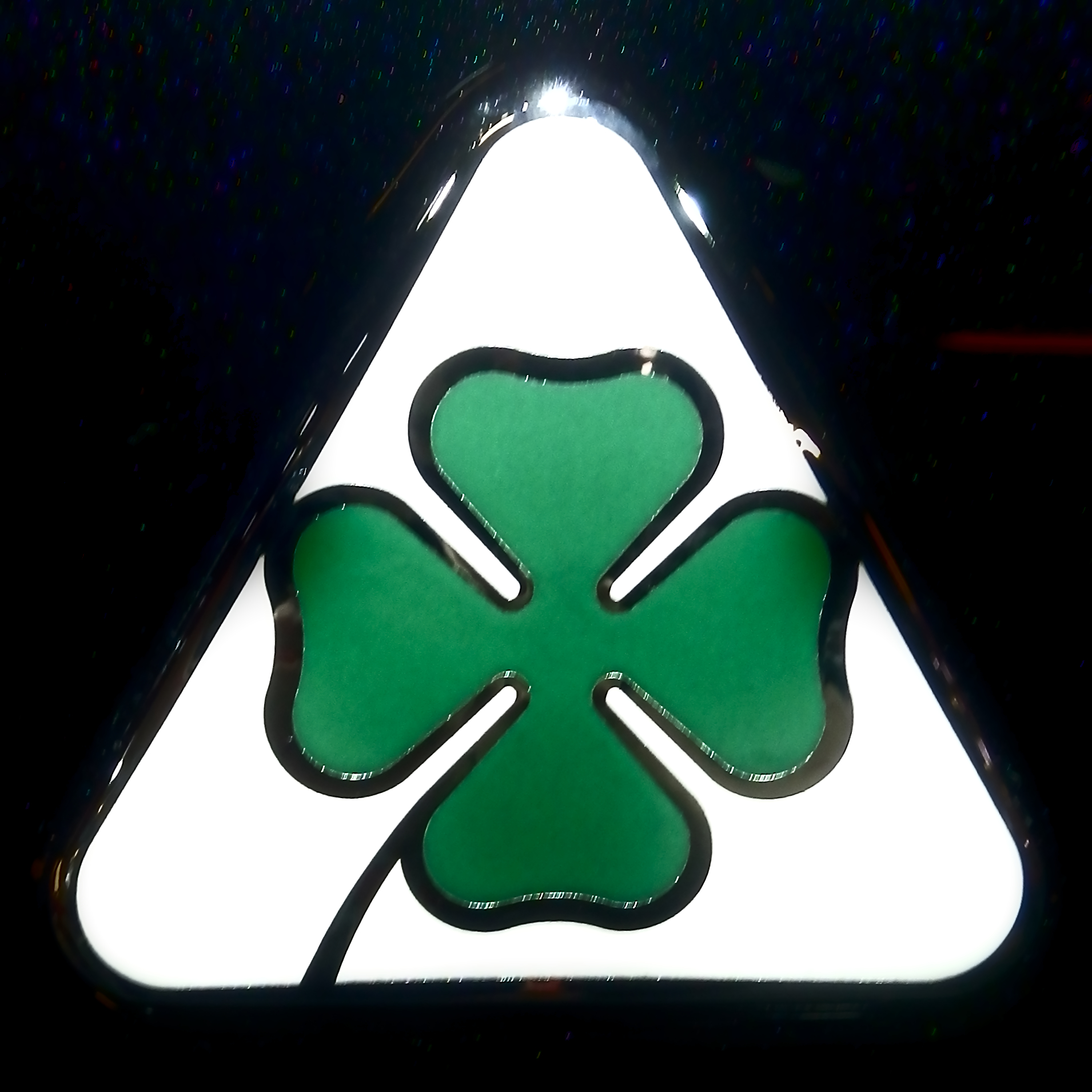
The Quadrifoglio logo

The top-of-the-line Giulia Quadrifoglio (Italian for "four-leaf clover") was the first model in the new Giulia range. It was unveiled in Italy in June 2015. It made its official international debut at the 2015 Frankfurt Motor Show. The Quadrifoglio's main competitors are the Mercedes-AMG C63, BMW M3, and the Cadillac ATS-V.

The Quadrifoglio is powered by an all-aluminium alloy, twin-turbocharged gasoline direct injection 90° 690T V6 engine, with a single-cylinder displacement of just under half a litre, for a total of 2,891 cc (176.4 cu in; 2.9 L). This engine was developed for the Quadrifoglio by engineers with Ferrari background and is derived from Ferrari's own twin-turbocharged F154 CB V8 engine, sharing the California T's bore x stroke of 86.5 mm × 82 mm (3.41 in × 3.23 in). The engine has a maximum power output of 510 PS (375 kW; 503 hp) at 6,500 rpm, and 600 N⋅m (443 lb⋅ft) of torque between 2,500 and 5,000 rpm. The turbochargers are single-scroll compressor IHI units integrated into the manifold, with water-charge air coolers. It has side-mounted direct and port fuel injection, and the peak turbo boost reaches up to 1.4 bar (20 psi) relative pressure.

With the inclusion of cylinder deactivation (that switches off the right bank of three cylinders), this model achieves a fuel consumption of 8.5 litres per 100 kilometres (33 mpg_{‑imp}; 28 mpg_{‑US}) and CO_{2} emissions of 198 g/km, in the combined cycle. The EPA combined fuel economy rating is 20 miles per gallon.

The Quadrifoglio weighs 1,734 kg (3,822 lb) and has a power-to-weight ratio of 3 kg (6.6 lb)/PS. Official factory "wet weight" is 1620 kg for the automatic gearbox version and 1580 kg for the manual version. Weight distribution is 52.5% front, 47.5% rear. This is achieved courtesy of the Quadrifoglio sharing the other models' composite and light alloy construction, as well as featuring a roof and bonnet made of carbon fibre.

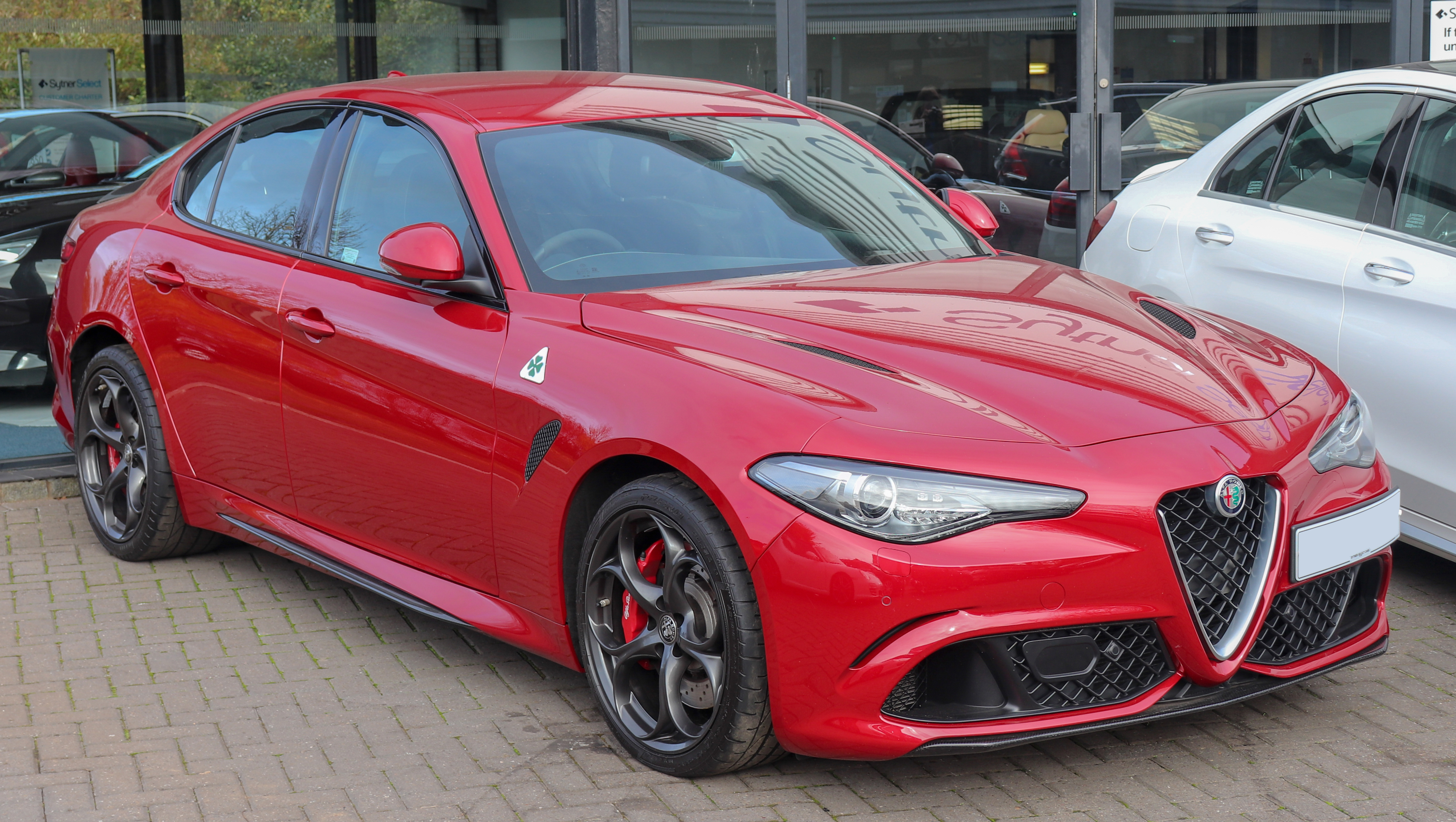
Giulia Quadrifoglio

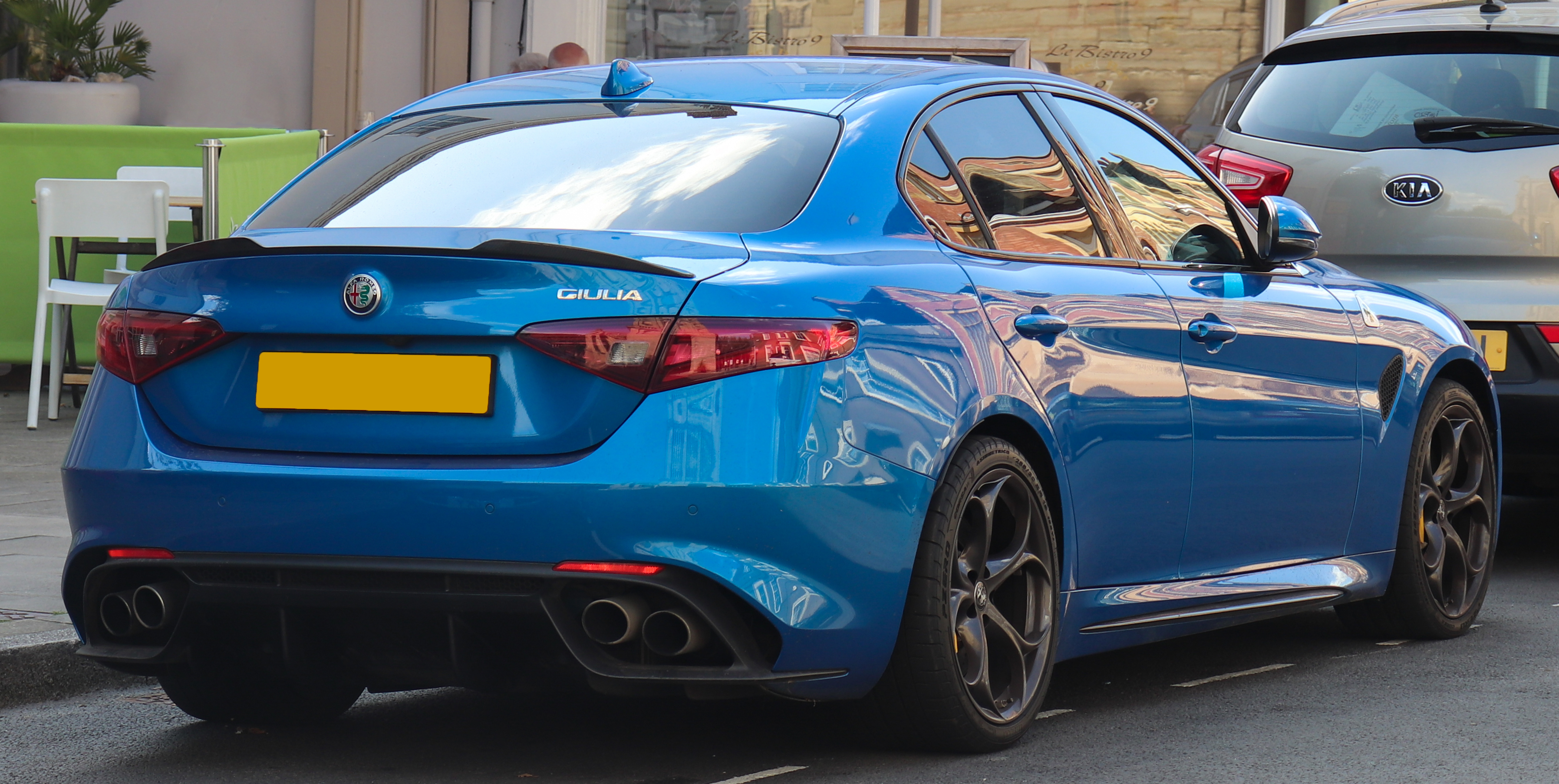
Giulia Quadrifoglio

From the front, the Quadrifoglio distinguishes itself from the rest of the range by a specific front bumper — with a carbon fibre splitter and enlarged air intakes for the added radiators (additional air-to-water intercooler on the right and additional engine cooling radiator on the left) and for the brakes — and by a bonnet featuring two cooling outlets for the engine bay. The front fenders have air vents and bear Quadrifoglio badges; the side skirts are specific to the model, as are the 19-inch cast or forged alloy wheels. At the rear, a low-profile carbon fibre lip-spoiler is applied to the boot lid, and a rear diffuser makes up the lower half of the bumper, flanked by quadruple exhaust tips. Working in conjunction with the faired-in underside, the diffuser is fully functional in generating downforce — as at the front is the "Active Aero Splitter", which lowers by 10 degrees between 100 and 230 km/h (62 and 143 mph) in Dynamic or Race modes. The manufacturer claims these active aero elements are the firsts in the Giulia's market segment and are able to generate up to 100 kp (1 kN; 220 lbf) of downforce at 186 mph (300 km/h). The Giulia Quadrifoglio has a drag coefficient of Cd=0.31.

Mechanically, this model was fitted with a torque-vectoring rear differential able to send 100% of the torque to each wheel, and an 8-speed automatic transmission manufactured by ZF, with a ZF six-speed manual transmission available as an option in European markets. A dual-clutch transmission was initially announced but was rejected. The differential was changed to a mechanical limited slip for the 2024 model year. The braking system has the option of Ceramic Composite Material (CCM) carbon-ceramic rotors, 390 mm (15 in) front and 360 mm (14 in) rear.

On the interior, the dashboard is part-trimmed in leather and carbon fibre, and the engine start button is located on the multi-function steering wheel. In addition, the driver is offered the Alfa Romeo DNA control selector, placed on the centre console. Driving modes include "Dynamic", "Natural", and "Advanced Efficiency", and "Race" (for high performance — with louder exhaust note and all electronic stability control systems turned off).

==== Performance ====
According to Alfa Romeo, the Giulia Quadrifoglio accelerates from 0 to 100 km/h (62 mph) in 3.9 seconds and comes to a standstill from that speed in 32 metres (105 ft). The Quadrifoglio can attain a top speed of 307 km/h (191 mph). This model equipped with a manual transmission completed the Nürburgring's Nordschleife circuit in 7 minutes and 39 seconds, a record for a saloon car. In September 2016 a new lap record for the automatic transmission version was published: 7 minutes and 32 seconds. Car and Driver magazine has recorded a standing quarter mile time of 11.9 seconds at 195 km/h (121 mph) and a 0 to 97 km/h (60 mph) acceleration time of 3.6 seconds. In Motor Trend Head 2 Head (Ep. 85) the Quadrifoglio won against the BMW M3 Competition and was rated higher than Mercedes-AMG C63 and Cadillac ATS-V. The track test was performed at Chuckwalla Valley Raceway. The Quadrifoglio was also previewed in The Grand Tour TV series in January 2017. It completed a lap of the show's test track only 1.1 seconds behind the new all-wheel-drive Honda NSX, both driven on a wet track, an excellent performance for a rear-wheel-drive car. The Quadrifoglio went around the Top Gear test track in 1:21.40.

==== Quadrifoglio NRING Edition ====
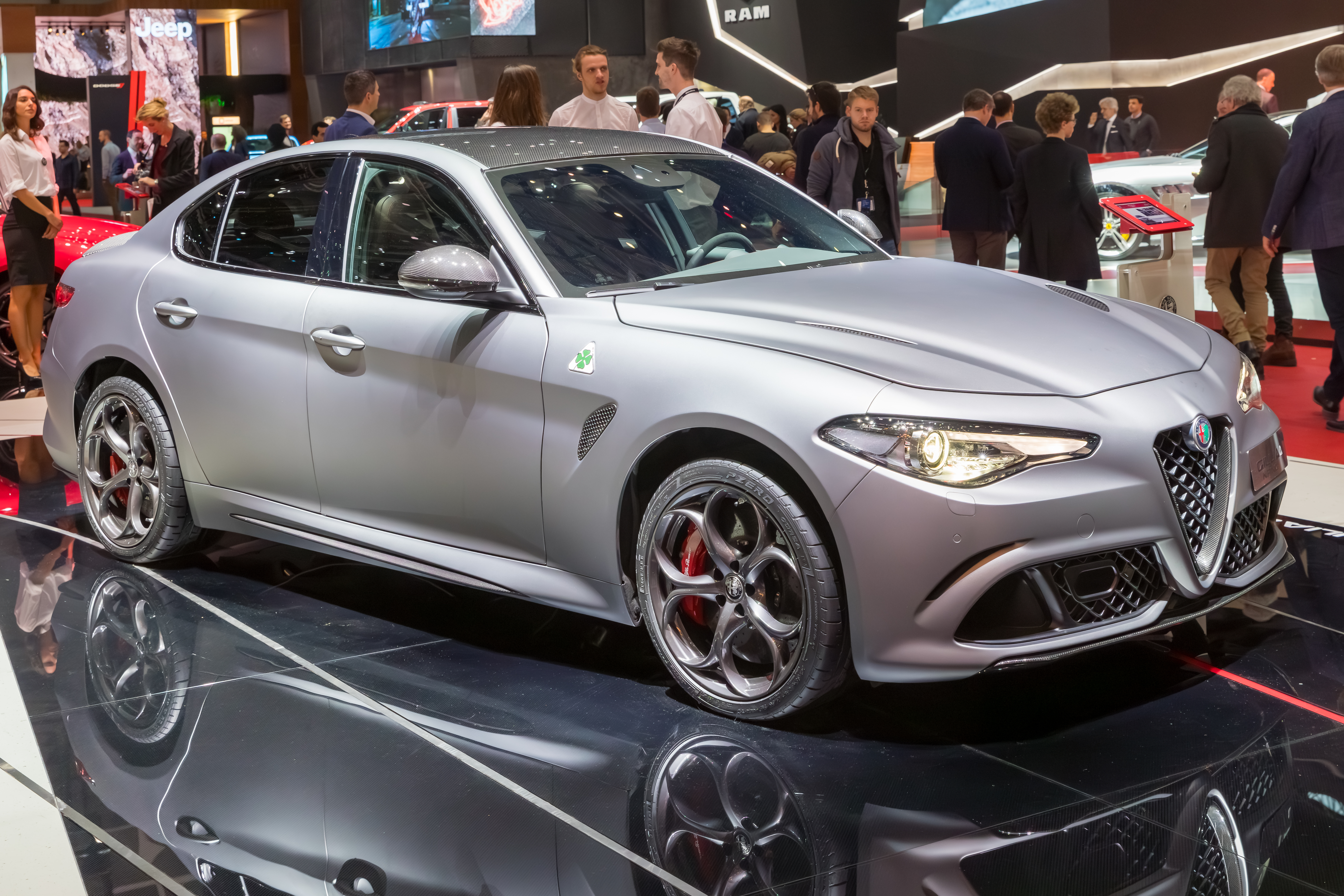
Giulia NRING Edition

At the 2018 Geneva Motor Show, the Alfa introduced the Giulia Quadrifoglio NRING Edition. The NRING edition has carbon-ceramic brakes, Sparco carbon fibre seats, carbon fibre interior trim, a Mopar-branded gear shifter, and Mopar floor mats. The car is differentiated on the exterior by 'NRING' badges as well as carbon fibre mirror caps and side skirts and an exposed carbon fibre roof. The equipment was upgraded to include adaptive cruise control and a premium sound system.

==== Quadrifoglio Racing Edition ====
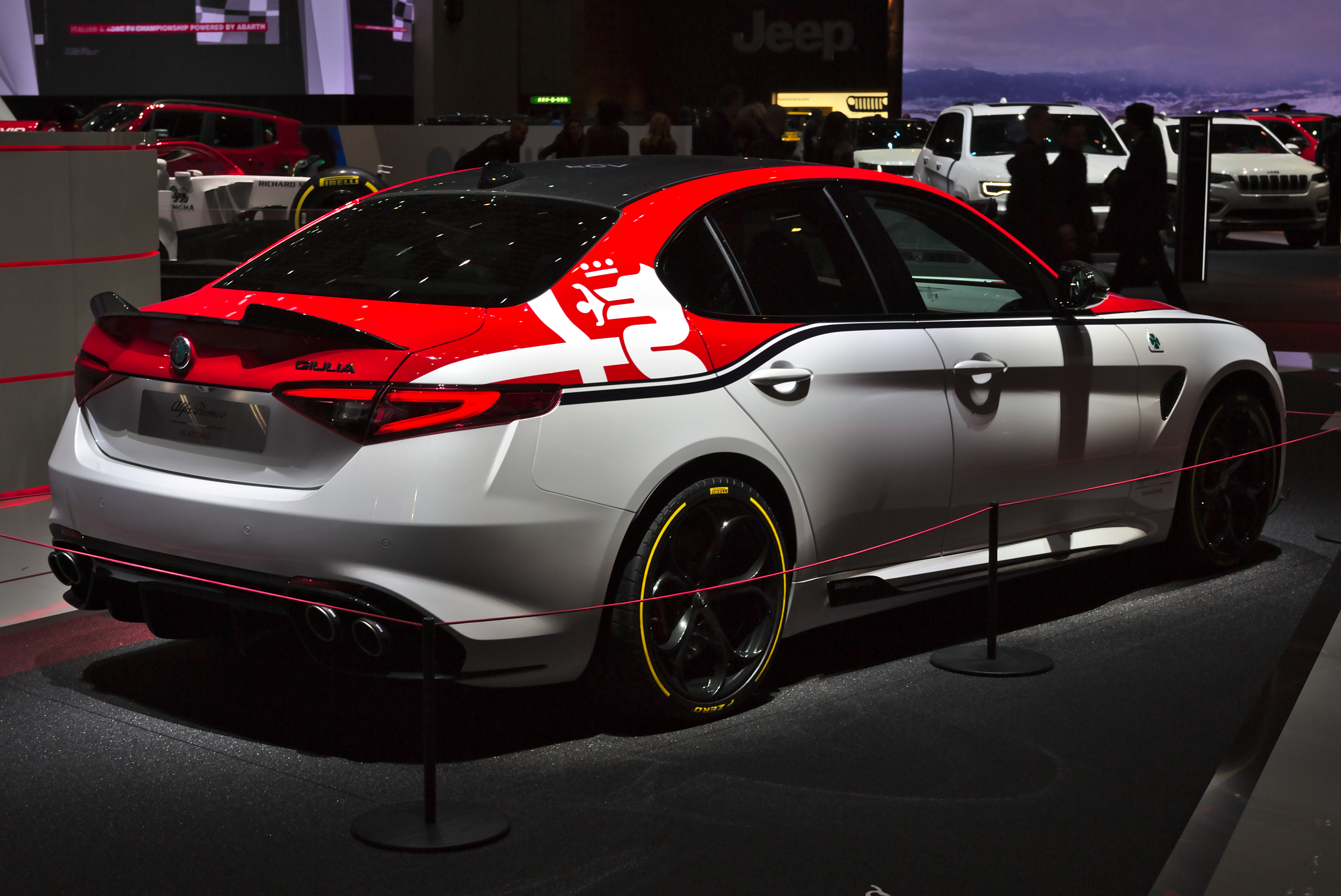
Giulia Racing Edition

At the 2019 Geneva Motor Show the Alfa Romeo Racing limited edition was introduced, which celebrates Alfa Romeo's legendary racing history and the entry of a new Italian driver in Formula 1 competition: Antonio Giovinazzi joining the "Alfa Romeo Racing" team together with the 2007 F1 World Champion Kimi Räikkönen. This special edition has exclusive paintwork, as a tribute to the Alfa Romeo Racing C38 Formula 1 car. It has also some stylistic details like some carbon fibre aerodynamic parts and an Akrapovič titanium exhaust system. The weight was reduced by about 28 kilograms (62 lb) from the standard Quadrifoglio, followed by a technical tune-up by Alfa Romeo engineers that has resulted more torque and power, which now amounts to 520 PS (382 kW; 513 hp).

=== Giulia Advanced Efficiency ===
At the 2016 Paris Motor Show, the Giulia's economic version called "AE" - Advanced Efficiency was unveiled. The AE was available with the Giulia and Giulia Super trim levels, and has a 180 PS (132 kW; 178 hp) diesel engine paired with an 8-speed automatic transmission. The fuel consumption combines to 4.2 L/100 km (67 mpg_{‑imp}; 56 mpg_{‑US}) and just 99 g/km of CO_{2} emissions in the combined cycle. It has some specific technical solutions to achieve these values like implementation of a low-pressure EGR valve that improves engine efficiency, an air-water intercooler, a secondary engine cooling circuit in addition to the primary circuit, and specific gearbox ratios. The height of the car's body is lowered by 5 mm (0.2 in), it has specifically designed alloy wheels and the drag coefficient has been reduced to 0.23 for less drag force. The Giulia "AE" Advanced Efficiency is fitted with specific 205/60 R16 tyres for reducing rolling resistance. It was discontinued beginning with 2019 model year.

=== GTA and GTAm ===
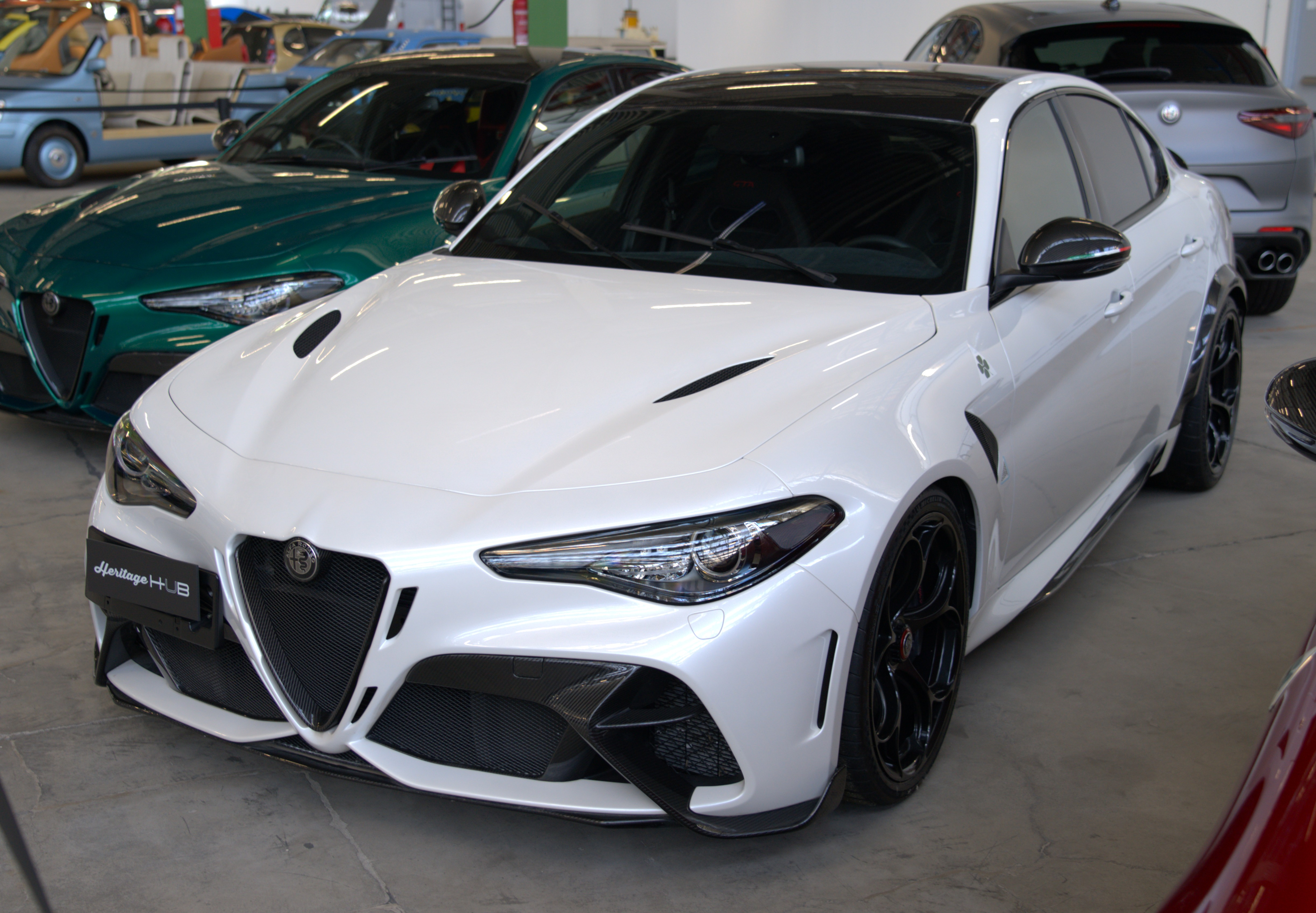
Giulia GTA

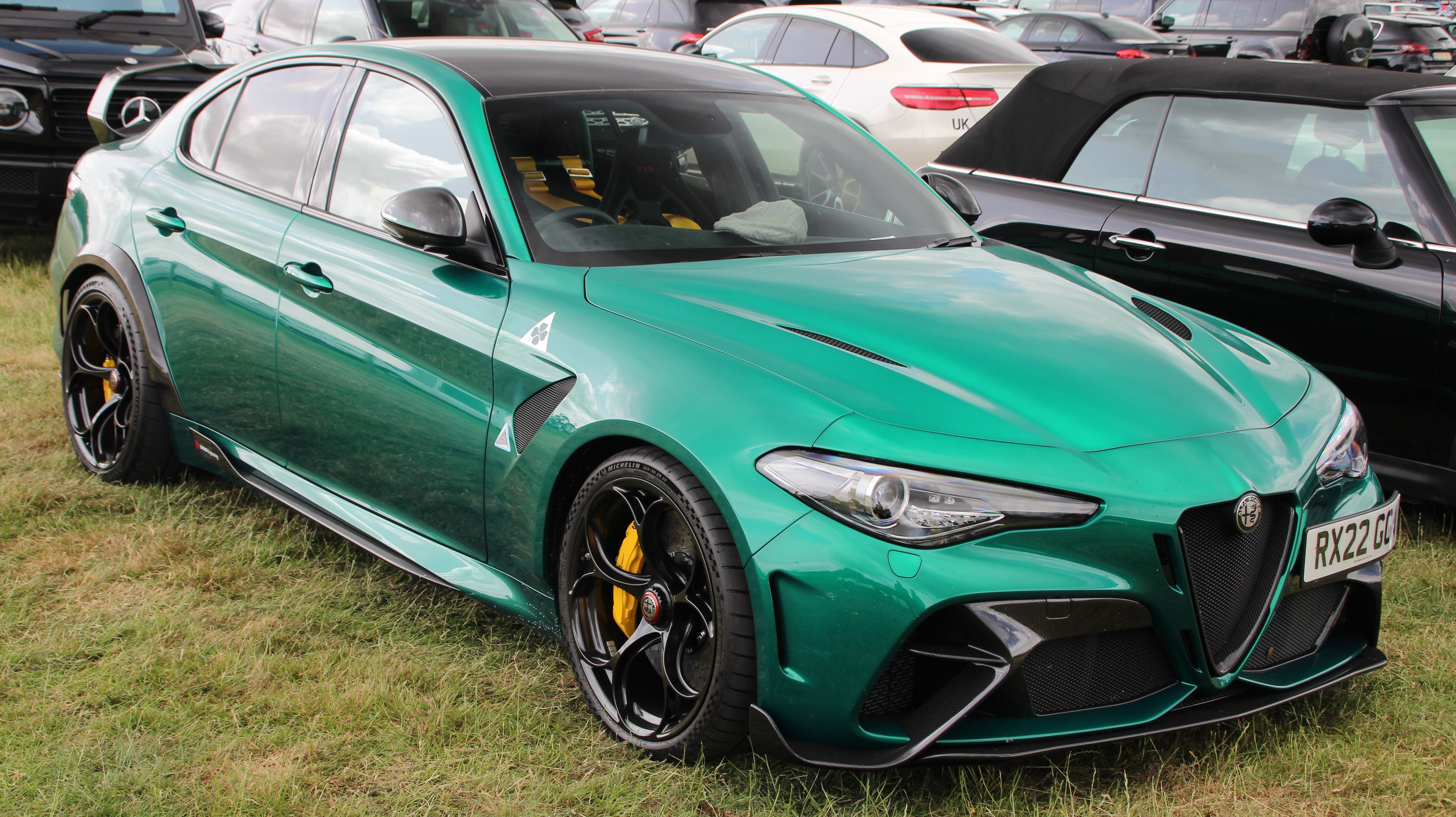
Giulia GTAm

On 2 March 2020, Alfa Romeo introduced two new GTA and GTAm models which would have a limited production run of 500 units. The GTA and GTAm versions are developed to celebrate the marque's 110th anniversary in 2020, and pay tribute to one of the most emblematic automobile of Alfa Romeo: Giulia GTA. The GTA and GTAm use the same engine, rated at 540 PS (397 kW; 533 hp), and are 100 kg (220 lb) lighter than the Quadrifoglio, allowing for a power to weight ratio of 2.82 kg/PS. The GTAm weighs 1,580 kg (3,483 lb) and the GTA weighs 1,605 kg (3,538 lb). The GTA and GTAm can accelerate from 0 to 100 km/h (62 mph) in 3.6 seconds, with launch control. The GTAm is a track focused model, and as a result has two seats, racing harnesses, and Lexan side and rear windows. The GTA's handling was improved by widening the front and rear track by 50 millimetres (2.0 in). The car is fitted with single nut wheels for weight reduction measures. Broader fenders cover the additional width. New springs, shocks, and bushings update the suspension as further means to improve the handling. Buyers will also receive a “personalized experience package”, which includes a Bell racing helmet in special GTA livery, a full racing suit by Alpinestars, a personalized Goodwool car cover, and a specific driving course devised by the Alfa Romeo Driving Academy.

Modifications to the engine include higher boost pressure from the turbochargers, an Akrapovič exhaust system and redesigned pistons to ensure constant power and reliability: the piston cooling system now uses four oil jets instead of two as is the case on Quadrifoglio model.

=== Quadrifoglio Collezione ===
For the 2025 model year Alfa Romeo introduced the Quadrifoglio Collezione, a lmited run for both the Giulia, and the Alfa Romeo Stelvio. The special edition was announced on December 1st, 2025. it is limited to a combined 63 models globally (available in the EU, UK, MEA, China, and Japan). The "63" is in reference to the first year when the now-iconic four leaf clover badge was introduced on a production car, the 1963 Alfa Romeo Giulia Ti Super, in Alfa Romeo's lineup. This special edition offers a leather interior, carbon fiber trims on the mirrors, roof and front badging. No modifications were made to the engine, it receives the same 382 kW (513 hp) 2.9 liter V6 as the aformentioned Quadrifoglio Racing Edition. The exhaust system is supplied by Akrapovič, as in previous high-end special editions, while the power is delivered through a rear-wheel drive system. The headrests are enbroideried with a “1 di 63 Collezione” text. The model is only available in a single, special color, the Rosso Collezione Giulia, inspired by the color of the 2023 Alfa Romeo 33 Stradale.

=== Luna Rossa ===
Unveiled in 2026, the Luna Rossa (Red Moon in Italian) is a collaboration between Alfa Romeo, and Luna Rossa Prada Pirelli. Mechanically it's identical to the Quadrifoglio Racing Edition, featuring the same 2.9 liter twin-turbo V6 and a self-locking center differential. The external carbon fiber elements increase downforce to 140 kg, while evoking elements of the AC75 racing yacht. The model is limited to 10 examples worldwide.

== Engines and performance ==
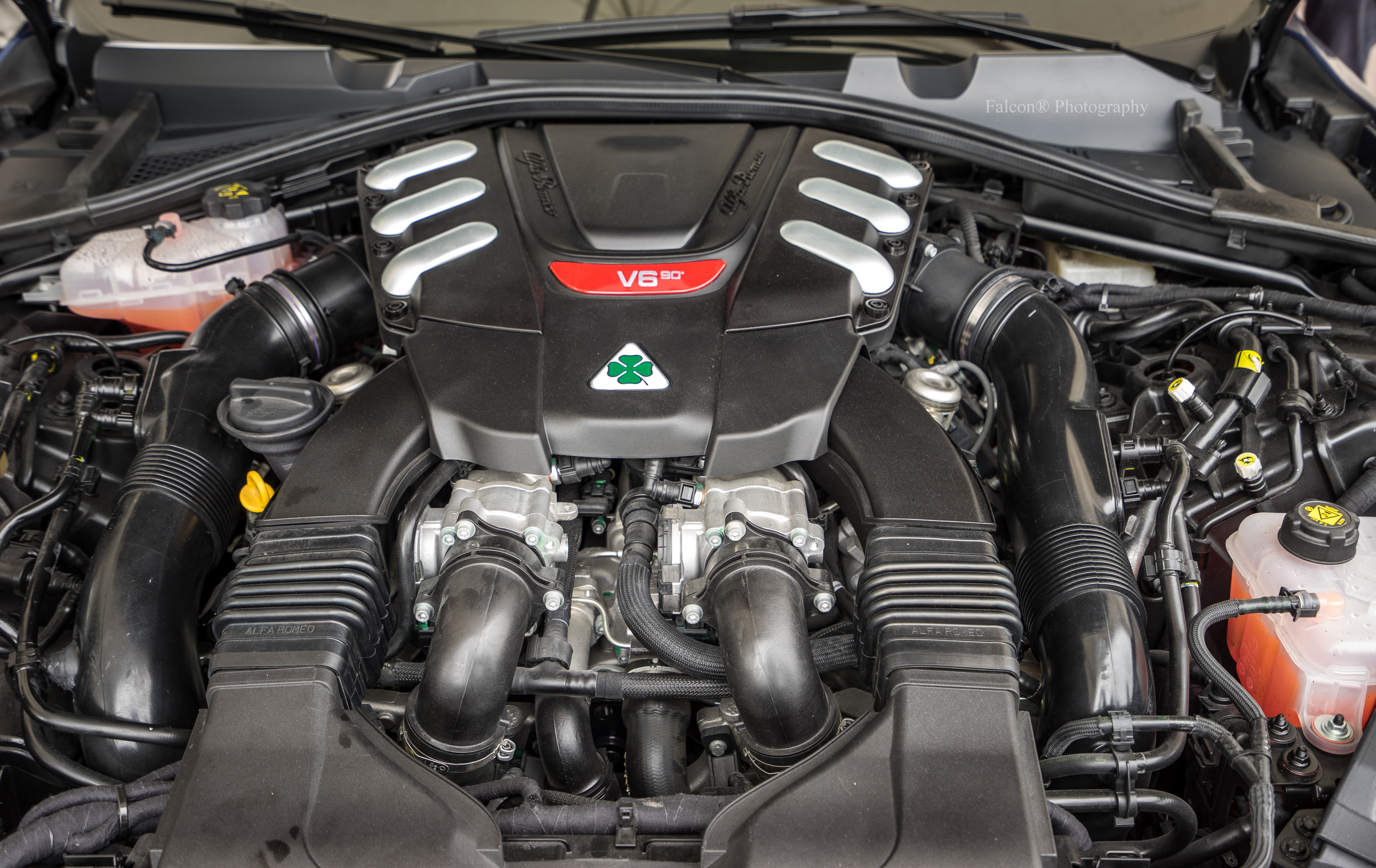
The 2.9-litre 690T twin-turbocharged V6 engine

The base models consist of four-cylinder petrol engines, as well as four-cylinder turbo diesel engines. The Quadrifoglio uses the V6 Alfa Romeo 690T engine, as described above. The petrol engines are built in Alfa Romeo Termoli plant. Diesel engines are built in the Pratola Serra plant.

The first models went on sale from February 2016 were the 2.2 L Multijet II turbodiesel and the 2.9 L V6 Quadrifoglio. A 2.0 L MultiAir2 turbo petrol engine was announced at the time of the Giulia Quadrifoglio's debut at the Los Angeles Auto Show in November 2015. The 2.0-litre gasoline engines are part of the all new FCA Global Medium Engine (GME) family. The Alfa version will share up to 70% parts with the GME family for other FCA brands.

Engine and transmission	Displacement	Max. power (CE)	Peak torque (CE)	Top speed	0–100 km/h (0–62 mph) (seconds)	Combined consumption (CE)	CO_{2} emissions (CE)	Notes
Petrol engine range
2.9 L 90° 24v twin-turbocharged V6 AT8 "690T"	2,891 cc (176.4 cu in)	540 PS (397 kW; 533 hp)	600 N⋅m (443 lb⋅ft)	300 km/h (186 mph)	3.6	10.8 L/100 km (26 mpg_{‑imp}; 22 mpg_{‑US})	274 g/km	GTA announced in 2020
2.9 L 90° 24v twin-turbocharged V6 AT8 "690T"	2,891 cc (176.4 cu in)	540 PS (397 kW; 533 hp)	600 N⋅m (443 lb⋅ft)	300 km/h (186 mph)	3.8	10.8 L/100 km (26 mpg_{‑imp}; 22 mpg_{‑US})	277 g/km	GTAm announced in 2020
2.9 L 90° 24v twin-turbocharged V6 AT8 "690T"	2,891 cc (176.4 cu in)	520 PS (382 kW; 513 hp)	600 N⋅m (443 lb⋅ft)	307 km/h (191 mph)	3.9	N/A	N/A	Limited Racing edition with Akrapovic exhaust, announced 2019; MY2024
2.9 L 90° 24v twin-turbocharged V6 MT6 "690T"	2,891 cc (176.4 cu in)	510 PS (375 kW; 503 hp) at 6,500 rpm	600 N⋅m (443 lb⋅ft) at 2,500–5,500 rpm	307 km/h (191 mph)	3.9	8.5 L/100 km (33 mpg_{‑imp}; 28 mpg_{‑US})	198 g/km	Only available in left-hand-drive countries (except North America).
2.9 L 90° 24v twin-turbocharged V6 AT8 "690T"	2,891 cc (176.4 cu in)	510 PS (375 kW; 503 hp) at 6,500 rpm	600 N⋅m (443 lb⋅ft) at 2,500–5,500 rpm	307 km/h (191 mph)	3.9	8.2 L/100 km (34 mpg_{‑imp}; 29 mpg_{‑US})	189 g/km	Available in all markets.
2.0 L turbocharged I4 GME MultiAir AT8 Q4	1,995 cc (121.7 cu in)	280 PS (206 kW; 276 hp) at 5250 rpm	400 N⋅m (295 lb⋅ft) at 2,250–4,500 rpm	240 km/h (149 mph)	5.2	6.4 L/100 km (44 mpg_{‑imp}; 37 mpg_{‑US})	152 g/km	
2.0 L turbocharged I4 GME MultiAir AT8 Q2	1,995 cc (121.7 cu in)	280 PS (206 kW; 276 hp) at 5250 rpm	400 N⋅m (295 lb⋅ft) at 2,250–4,500 rpm	240 km/h (149 mph)	5.7	6.4 L/100 km (44 mpg_{‑imp}; 37 mpg_{‑US})	144 g/km	Available in German market.
2.0 L turbocharged I4 GME MultiAir AT8	1,995 cc (121.7 cu in)	250 PS (184 kW; 247 hp) at 5250 rpm<	400 N⋅m (295 lb⋅ft) at 2,250–4,500 rpm	n/a	n/a	n/a	n/a	2020 Italian market. "Superbollo tax model"
2.0 L I4 GME turbocharged MultiAir AT8	1,995 cc (121.7 cu in)	200 PS (147 kW; 197 hp) at 5,000 rpm	330 N⋅m (243.4 lb⋅ft) at 1,750 rpm	235 km/h (146 mph)	6.6	5.9 L/100 km (48 mpg_{‑imp}; 40 mpg_{‑US})	138 g/km	
Diesel engine range
2.2 L I4 Multijet II AT8 Q4	2,143 cc (130.8 cu in)	210 PS (154 kW; 207 hp)	470 N⋅m (347 lb⋅ft) at 1,750 rpm	235 km/h (146 mph)	6.9	4.7 L/100 km (60 mpg_{‑imp}; 50 mpg_{‑US})	122 g/km	MY2019
2.2 L I4 Multijet II AT8 Q4	2,143 cc (130.8 cu in)	180 PS (132 kW; 178 hp)	450 N⋅m (332 lb⋅ft) at 1,750 rpm	230 km/h (143 mph)	6.8	4.7 L/100 km (60 mpg_{‑imp}; 50 mpg_{‑US})	122 g/km	2015-2018
2.2 L I4 Multijet II AT8	2,143 cc (130.8 cu in)	180 PS (132 kW; 178 hp)	450 N⋅m (332 lb⋅ft) at 1,750 rpm	230 km/h (143 mph)	7.1	4.2 L/100 km (67 mpg_{‑imp}; 56 mpg_{‑US})	109 g/km	2015-2018
2.2 L I4 Multijet II AE AT8	2,143 cc (130.8 cu in)	180 PS (132 kW; 178 hp) at 3,750 rpm	450 N⋅m (332 lb⋅ft) at 1750 rpm	230 km/h (143 mph)	7.2	3.8 L/100 km (74 mpg_{‑imp}; 62 mpg_{‑US})	99 g/km	2015-2018
2.2 L I4 Multijet II MT6	2,143 cc (130.8 cu in)	180 PS (132 kW; 178 hp) at 3,750 rpm	380 N⋅m (280 lb⋅ft) at 1,750 rpm	230 km/h (143 mph)	7.2	4.2 L/100 km (67 mpg_{‑imp}; 56 mpg_{‑US})	109 g/km	2015-2018
2.2 L I4 Multijet II AT8	2,143 cc (130.8 cu in)	190 PS (140 kW; 187 hp) at 3,750 rpm	450 N⋅m (332 lb⋅ft) at 1,750 rpm	230 km/h (143 mph)	7.1	4.9 L/100 km (58 mpg_{‑imp}; 48 mpg_{‑US})	128 g/km	MY2019
2.2 L I4 Multijet II AT8 Q4	2,143 cc (130.8 cu in)	190 PS (140 kW; 187 hp) at 3,750 rpm	450 N⋅m (332 lb⋅ft) at 1,750 rpm	230 km/h (143 mph)	7.1	5.5 L/100 km (51 mpg_{‑imp}; 43 mpg_{‑US})	145 g/km	MY2019
2.2 L I4 Multijet II MT6	2,143 cc (130.8 cu in)	190 PS (140 kW; 187 hp) at 3,750 rpm	450 N⋅m (332 lb⋅ft) at 1,750 rpm	230 km/h (143 mph)	7.1	5.5 L/100 km (51 mpg_{‑imp}; 43 mpg_{‑US})	145 g/km	MY2019 (Czechia)
2.2 L I4 Multijet II MT6	2,143 cc (130.8 cu in)	150 PS (110 kW; 148 hp) at 4,000 rpm	380 N⋅m (280 lb⋅ft) at 1,500 rpm	221 km/h (137 mph)	8.4	4.2 L/100 km (67 mpg_{‑imp}; 56 mpg_{‑US})	109 g/km	2015-2018
2.2 L I4 Multijet II AT8	2,143 cc (130.8 cu in)	150 PS (110 kW; 148 hp) at 4,000 rpm	450 N⋅m (332 lb⋅ft) at 1,750 rpm	221 km/h (137 mph)	8.2	4.2 L/100 km (67 mpg_{‑imp}; 56 mpg_{‑US})	109 g/km	2015-2018
2.2 L I4 Multijet II AT8	2,143 cc (130.8 cu in)	160 PS (118 kW; 158 hp) at 4,000 rpm	450 N⋅m (332 lb⋅ft) at 1,500 rpm	221 km/h (137 mph)	8.2	4.9 L/100 km (58 mpg_{‑imp}; 48 mpg_{‑US})	128 g/km	MY2019
2.2 L I4 Multijet II MT6	2,143 cc (130.8 cu in)	136 PS (100 kW; 134 hp) at 4,250 rpm	380 N⋅m (280 lb⋅ft) at 1,500 rpm	210 km/h (130 mph)	9.0	4.2 L/100 km (67 mpg_{‑imp}; 56 mpg_{‑US})	109 g/km	2015-2018 Offered only in some EU markets, for tax reasons
2.2 L I4 Multijet II AT8	2,143 cc (130.8 cu in)	136 PS (100 kW; 134 hp) at 2,500 rpm	450 N⋅m (332 lb⋅ft) at 1,750 rpm	210 km/h (130 mph)	9.5	4.8 L/100 km (59 mpg_{‑imp}; 49 mpg_{‑US})	128 g/km	MY2019 Offered only in some EU markets, for tax reasons
Note: MT6 6-speed manual transmission, AT8 8-speed automatic transmission, Q4 all-wheel drive, Q2 rear-wheel drive with limited-slip differential

=== North American models ===
Engine and transmission	Displacement	Max. power	Peak torque	Top speed	0–60 mph (0–97 km/h) (seconds)	EPA fuel economy combined	EPA CO_{2} emissions	Notes
Petrol engine range
2.9 L 90° twin-turbocharged 24v V6 AT8 "690T"	2,891 cc (176.4 cu in)	505 hp (512 PS; 377 kW) at 6,500 rpm	443 lb⋅ft (600 N⋅m) at 2,500–5,500 rpm	191 mph (307 km/h)	3.8	20 mpg_{‑US} (12 L/100 km; 24 mpg_{‑imp})	451 g/mi (280 g/km)	
2.0 L turbocharged I4 GME MultiAir AT8 AWD	1,995 cc (121.7 cu in)	280 hp (284 PS; 209 kW) at 5,200 rpm	306 lb⋅ft (415 N⋅m) at 2,000–4,800 rpm	149 mph (240 km/h)	5.1	26 mpg_{‑US} (9.0 L/100 km; 31 mpg_{‑imp})	348 g/mi (216 g/km)	
2.0 L turbocharged I4 GME MultiAir AT8	1,995 cc (121.7 cu in)	280 hp (284 PS; 209 kW) at 5,200 rpm	306 lb⋅ft (410 N⋅m) at 2,000-4,800 rpm	149 mph (240 km/h)	5.5	27 mpg_{‑US} (8.7 L/100 km; 32 mpg_{‑imp})	330 g/mi (205 g/km)	

== Market ==
=== North America ===
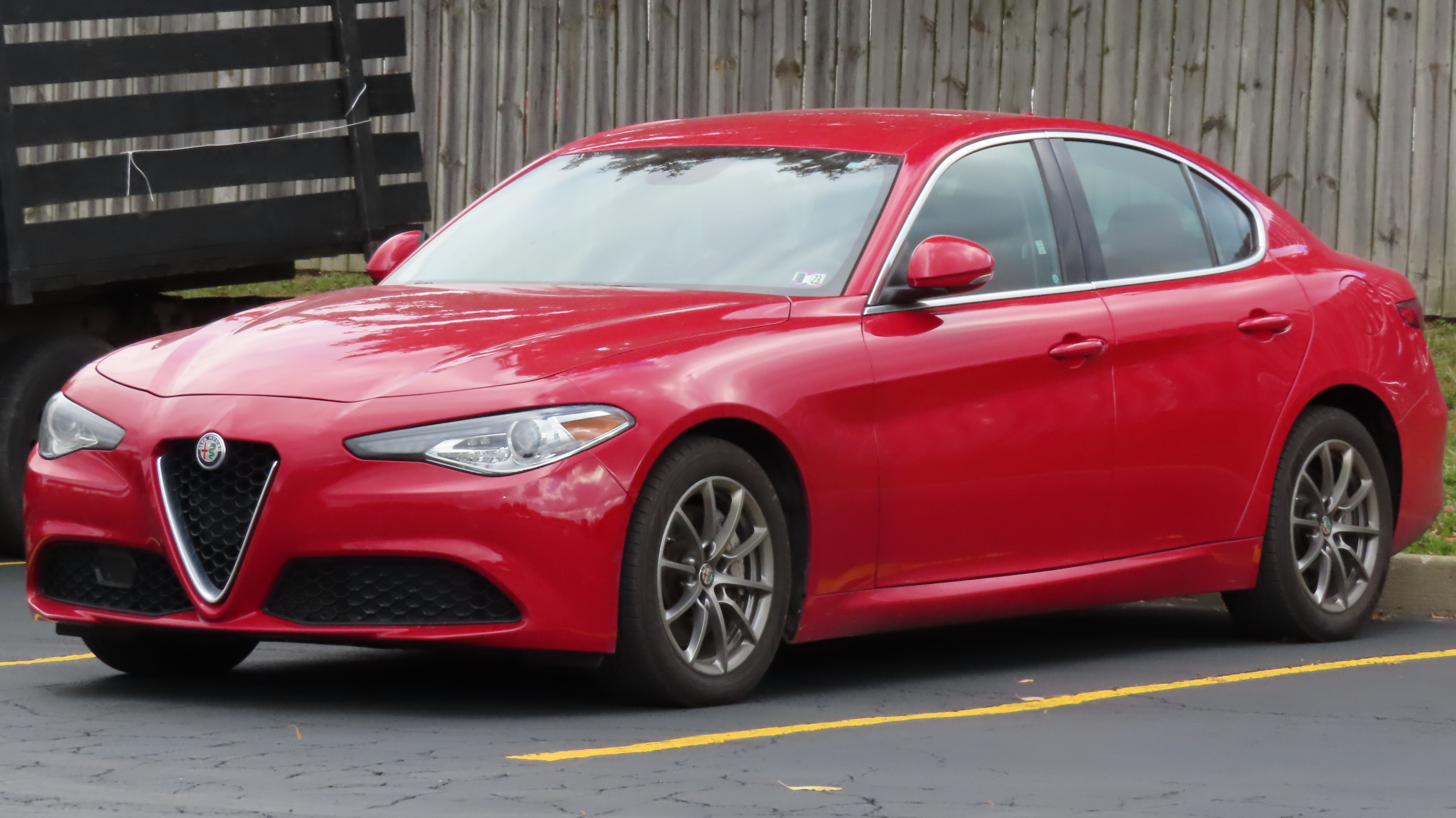
Alfa Romeo Giulia Q4 (US)

The Alfa Romeo Giulia was new for the 2017 model year. Initially it came as Giulia (base), Ti (for Turismo internazionale) and Quadrifoglio. The so-called base and Ti are powered by the 280 hp gasoline motor similar to the one in the European Veloce. The Ti could be ordered with Lusso (luxury) and Sport Package. With the exception of Quadrifoglio, all other models are available with Alfa's Q4 all-wheel-drive system. Eight-speed automatic transmission is standard across the range. The Ti Sport and Quadrifoglio also came with paddle shifters mounted on the steering column (providing a shift time less than 100 milliseconds). The eight-speed automatic transmission was co-developed with ZF.

For 2021 model year, the Giulia was offered as the entry-level Sprint, Ti, Ti Sport, and Quadrifoglio. The Lusso package was discontinued, but its luxury features like wood panel, more refined leather, and dual-pane sunroof became standard on the Ti. The Ti Sport was officially called Veloce for 2022 model year. The Sprint, Ti, and Quadrifoglio stayed in the line up.

The facelift 2024 model year Giulia gains LED matrix headlights, a 12.3-inch digital instrument cluster, updated ADAS features, and a mechanical LSD for the Quadrifoglio. Engine power is also boosted to 520 PS for the Quadrifoglio. The line up consisted of Sprint, Ti, Veloce, Veloce-based limited edition Competizione, and Quadrifoglio.

==== Giulia Nero Edizione Package ====
At the 2018 New York International Auto Show, the Nero Edizione Package for the Giulia was announced. The package includes a new exterior appearance through special blacked-out wheels, badging, and other touches.

==== Giulia Speciale Verde Montreal ====
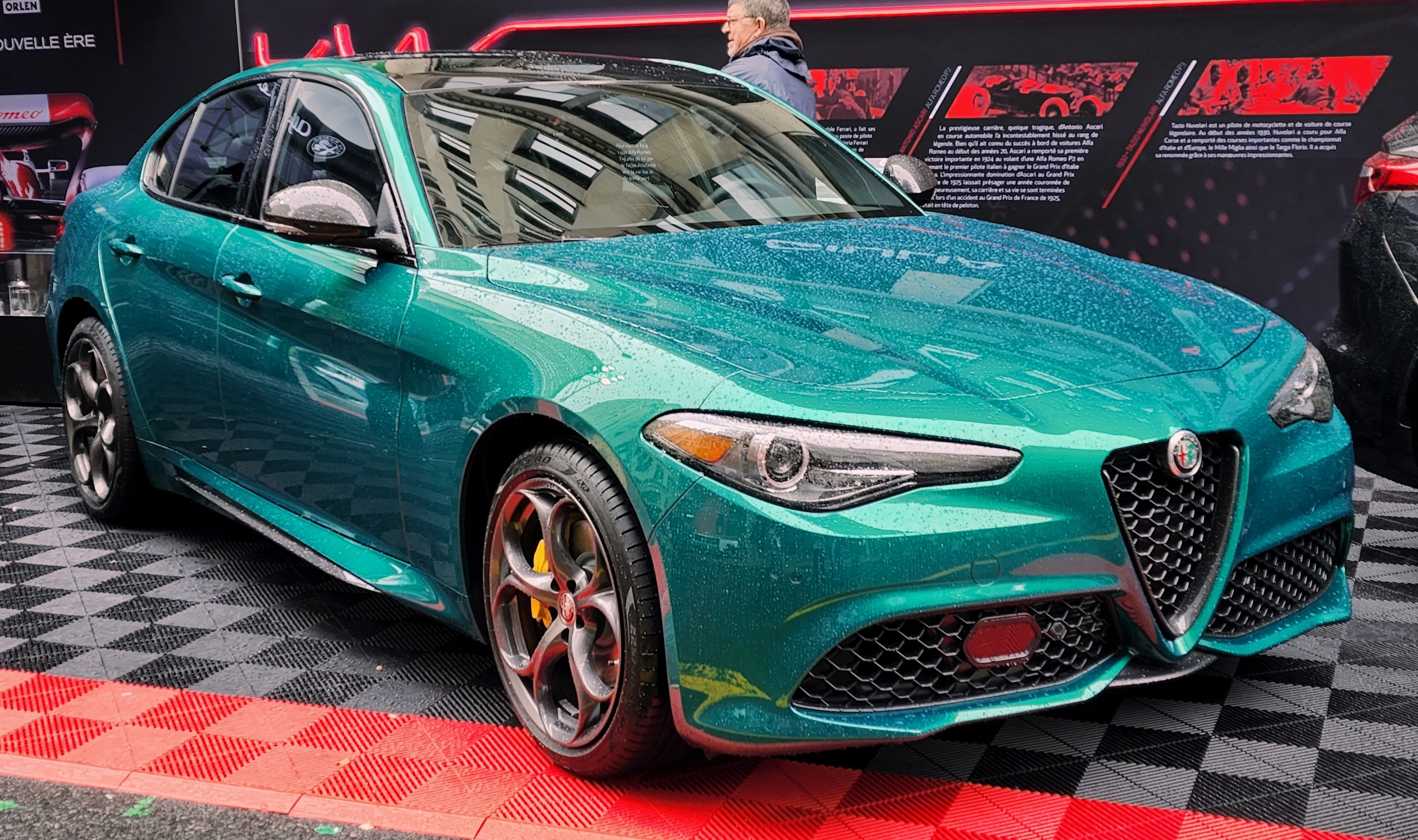
Alfa Romeo Giulia Veloce Speciale (Canada)

In June 2022, the limited edition Giulia Speciale Verde Montreal was exclusively launched for the Canadian market. Based on the Giulia Veloce, it's painted "Verde Montreal Tri-Coat" bright green, and came with 19-inch dark alloy wheels with yellow brake caliper, adaptive suspension, Harman Kardon sound system, and carbon fiber accent interior.

=== Europe ===
In most European countries including the UK, the Alfa Romeo Giulia was initially offered as the Giulia (base), Super, Speciale, Veloce, and Quadrifoglio.

For the 2019 model year, the Giulia diesel engine was updated to meet the Euro 6d emission standards, with AdBlue technology introduced to tackle nitrogen oxides in the exhaust. The 150 PS (110 kW; 148 hp) and 180 PS (132 kW; 178 hp) versions got a power increase by 10 PS (7 kW; 10 hp). All models now come with an 8.8-inch infotainment system with Apple Car Play and Android Auto as standard. In addition, the Giulia Quadrifoglio engine was updated to include 6 port injectors following a shut down of the engine factory to update the production lines.

In 2020 the Giulia received a number of minor updates, with a redesigned center console and the infotainment system being upgraded to a touchscreen affair, albeit still with a rotary dial to control certain functions, and the interior materials being improved. The trim levels are Super, Sprint, Veloce, Veloce Ti, Lusso Ti, and Quadrifoglio. As a first for this model year, Veloce trim is now also available as a rear wheel drive model in European markets (excluding the UK, where it has been available since the beginning).

In 2022 the line up was revised with Sprint became the most affordable, followed by the Veloce, the new Estrema, and the Quadrifoglio.

==== B-Tech Special Edition ====
In September 2018, the B-Tech Special Edition for Europe was announced which similar as Nero Edizione edition unveiled earlier for North American markets.

=== Asia Pacific ===
==== Australia ====
The Alfa Romeo Giulia was launched for the Australian market in May 2017. The base model was powered by the 147 KW engine, the Super was offered with either the same gasoline engine as the base, or the 132 KW diesel engine. The 206 KW Veloce Q2 and 375 KW Quadrifoglio were also offered. All models have 8-speed ZF automatic gearbox.

==== Japan ====
In October 2017, the Giulia was unveiled for the Japanese market with the initial models were Giulia (base), Super, Veloce Q4, and Quadrifoglio. The Veloce Q2 and diesel-powered Super came later in 2018 and 2019 respectively.

The Japan-only Veloce-based Visconti limited edition was released in March 2021. It came with Visconti dark green exterior paint, black grille and side mirror caps, yellow brake calipers, and tan leather interior. Although the Visconti edition was only sold in Japan, the same Visconti green color with similar features model was also offered in certain European countries. The high performance Quadrifoglio GTA and race-ready GTAm were added to Japanese line up in April 2021.

In November 2025, Stellantis Japan released the 73 units limited edition Giulia Intensa, together with only 12 units Stelvio Intensa.

==== Singapore ====
For the Singaporean market, the Giulia was released in early 2018. EuroAutomobile, the previous Alfa Romeo sole distributor in Singapore, officially imported the Giulia (base), Super, Veloce, and Quadrifoglio.

In 2023 under then new distributor, Capella Auto, the facelift model Giulia was released. At that time the only model offered was the Veloce, with the Quadrifoglio would come in 2024.

In 2025, Red Rock & Rosso Motor replaced Capella Auto as the new Alfa Romeo distributor. The Giulia Veloce and Quadrifoglio continued to be offered in this island country.

==== Malaysia ====
The pre-facelift Giulia Quadrifoglio was offered in the very small numbers brought by the parallel importers.

In late 2025, it was announced that Alfa Romeo will officially return to Malaysia after hiatus since 2013. The facelift Giulia Veloce Q2 is available for sale beginning early 2026.

==== China ====
The Giulia's 2020 model year version was first introduced in China. It has an updated interior with a new 8.8-inch touchscreen for the infotainment system, which now offers a Wi-Fi hotspot, over-the-air software upgrades, an integrated emergency call function, and a call assistant function. The interior now has a leather-wrapped multifunction steering wheel and a leather-wrapped gear lever.

== Facelift ==
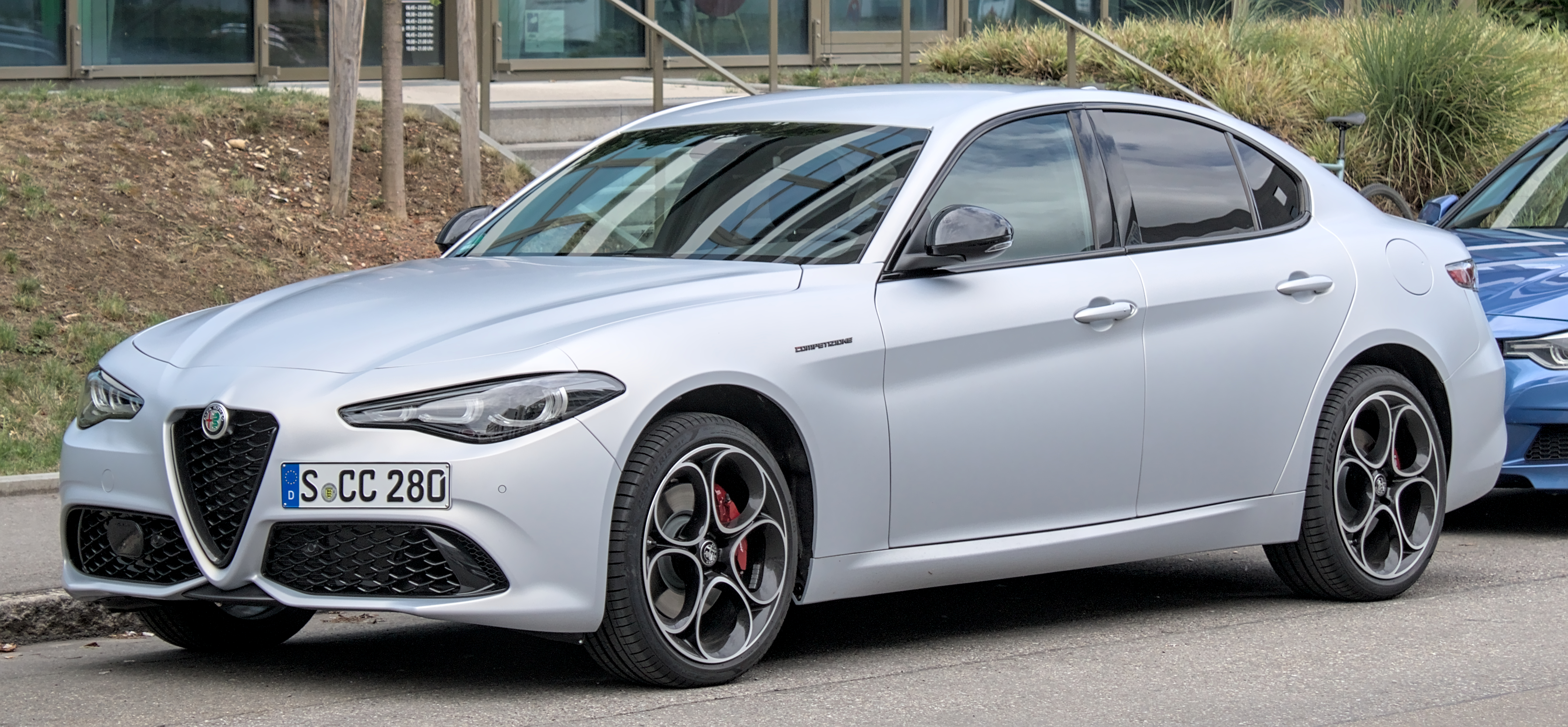
Alfa Romeo Giulia Competizione (facelift)

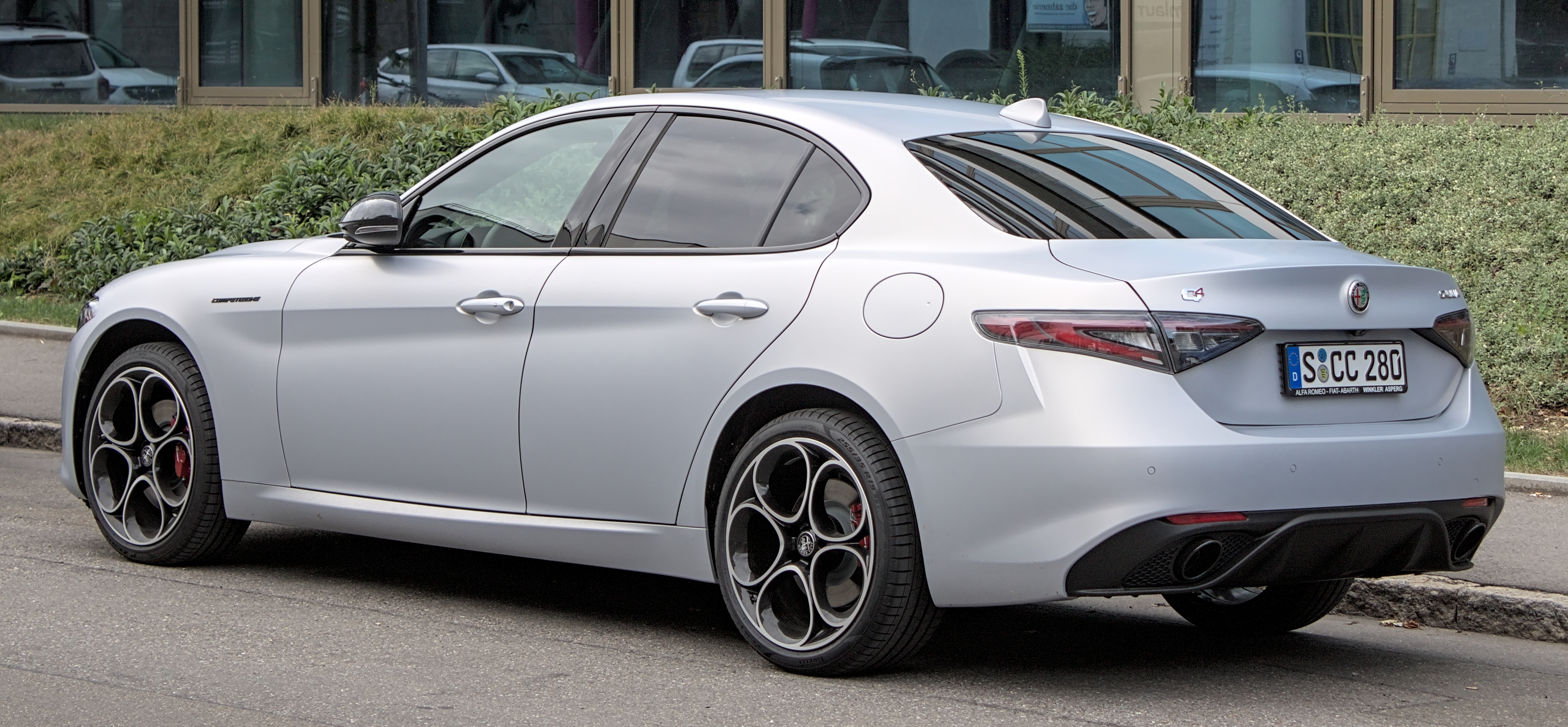
Rear view (facelift)

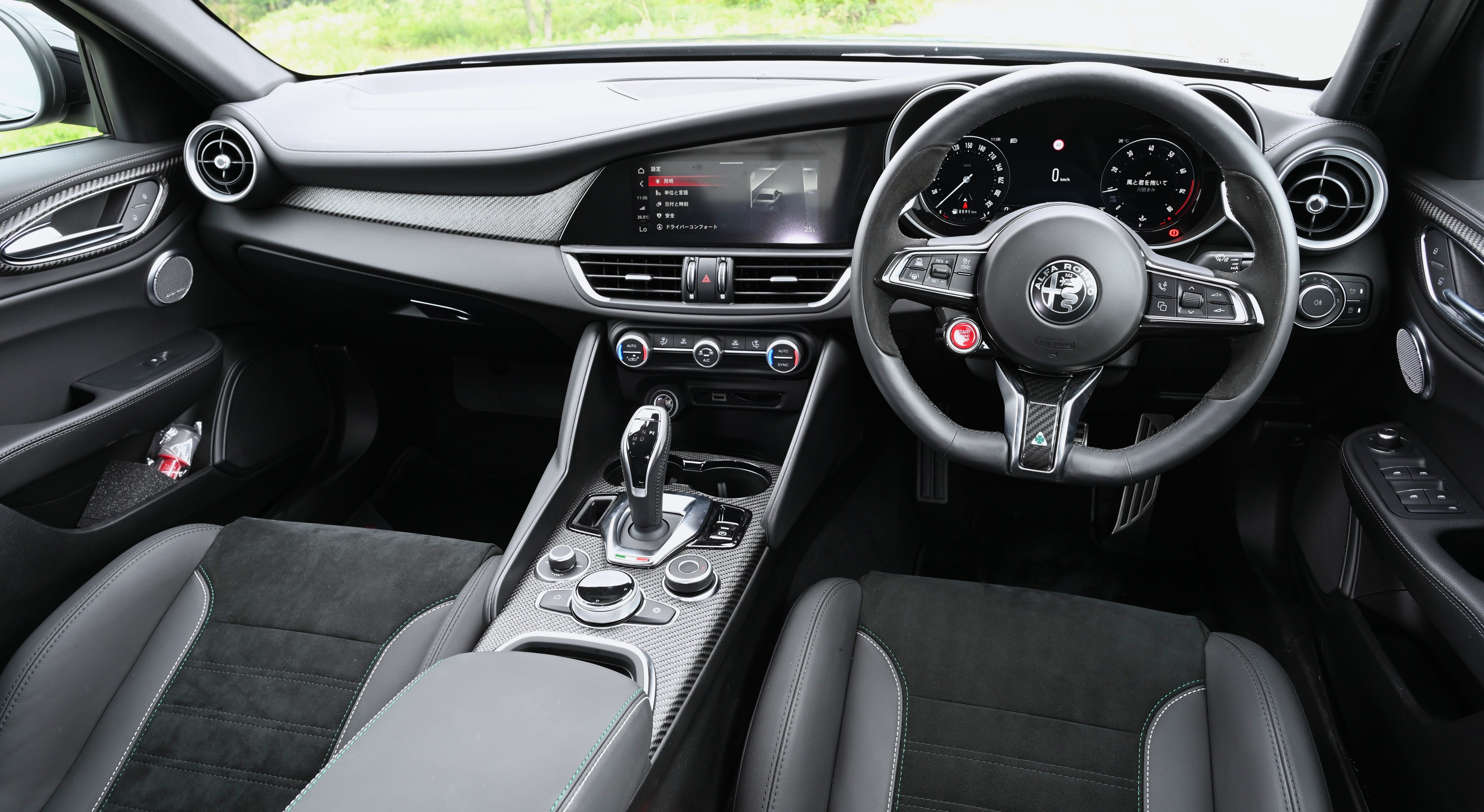
Facelift interior

The facelift Alfa Romeo Giulia was announced in late 2022, and available for sale in 2023 or for the 2024 model year in North America. For this facelift, the most significant change is the new 3+3 headlights with adaptive LED Matrix. The rear combination lamps were also revised with smoked lenses. Inside it has the new 12.3-inch digital instrument panel with 3 different layouts: Evolved, Relax, and Heritage.

The Giulia line up was simplified with the discontinuation of models with 136 PS diesel and 200 PS gasoline engine. Globally, the model grades are now Sprint, Ti, Veloce, and Quadrifoglio.

As of 2024 in its home market, the Giulia is only offered in Sprint, Veloce, limited edition Tributo Italiano, and Quadrifoglio trim levels. The Sprint and Veloce can be ordered with 160 PS diesel engine for the rear wheel drive model, or 210 PS diesel and 280 PS gasoline for the Q4 all-wheel-drive.

=== Quadrifoglio 100th Anniversario ===
To celebrate 100 years of Alfa Romeo RL Quadrifoglio which won the 1923 Targa Florio, the 100 units limited edition Giulia Quadrifoglio 100th Anniversario were released in April 2023. It comes with carbon grille and side mirror caps, gold brake calipers, and special badge on the front fenders. Inside, it has combination of black leather and Alcantara with gold stitching seats and steering wheel, as well as special stitching of 100 golden Quadrifoglio on the dashboard.

=== Competizione ===
Launched in 2023, the Giulia Competizione is based on the Veloce. It has active suspension, red brake calipers, limited-slip differential, "Competizione" emblems, darker privacy glass, and optional Moonlight Gray matte paint. The interior features leather dashboard and seats with red stitching, Competizione badging on the headrests and seat sides, and 14-speakers Harman Kardon sound system. The Giulia Competizione is new for the 2024 model year in North America.

=== Tributo Italiano ===
The Tributo Italiano special edition models of Giulia, Tonale, and Stelvio were announced in November 2023, and available for sale in 2024. These models are available in three different colours: Alfa Rosso (red), Alfa Bianca (white), and Montreal Verde (green) which represent the Italian flag.

Powered by the same 280 PS engine as the Giulia Veloce, the Giulia Tributo Italiano comes with black roof, black side mirror caps with red-white-green accent, black "V" insert grille, 19-inch alloy wheels, and red brake calipers. Limited-slip-differential and Dual-Stage valve active suspension are installed for better handling and comfort.

For the interior, it features black leather seats with red perforated dots and red stitching, headrests with embroidered Alfa Romeo logo, Tributo Italiano, and Italian flag. The dashboard and door trims feature carbon panel and red stitching. 14-speakers Harman Kardon sound system is also standard.

=== Quadrifoglio Super Sport ===
In May 2024, Alfa Romeo released the Quadrifoglio Super Sport version of Giulia and Stelvio. This limited edition of 275 units Giulia and 175 units Stelvio are built to celebrate Alfa Romeo's first Mille Miglia victory in 1928 with an Alfa Romeo 6C 1500 Super Sport. These Super Sport editions are to be marketed globally, and available in 3 colors: Rosso Etna (red), Nero Vulcano (black), and for the Giulia only Bianco Alfa (white).

Like the facelift regular Giulia Quadrifoglio, the Super Sport is also powered by the 520 PS engine and has standard mechanical limited-slip differential and Synaptic Dynamic Control (SDSC) suspension, as well as the Akrapovič exhaust system like that of the Giulia GTA. The Super Sport comes with the "V" grille, side mirror caps, and trunk spoiler made of carbon fiber, and Quadrifoglio logo with black background. Dark 19-inch alloy wheels and black brake calipers are also standard.

The interior of Super Sport features red carbon fiber on the dashboard, door trims, and center console. The black leather seats have red stitching, and on the front headrests, there are red Alfa Romeo logo and "Super Sport" stitching, as well as the black numbering stitching to certify this limited-edition model. The steering wheel is upholstered in leather and Alcantara with carbon fiber accent.

=== Intensa ===
The special edition Intensa series of Giulia, Junior, Tonale, and Stelvio were launched in February 2025. Based on the Giulia Veloce, the Giulia Intensa can be distinguished by the 19-inch diamond-cut alloy wheels in two tones with matte finish and black brake calipers embellished with light gold details, and the Italian flag motive on the door mirror covers. The interior features leather dashboard and door panels, as well as leather seats, with a tan-colored center armrest and matching stitching. The Giulia Intensa also features a two-tone steering wheel with tan accents and contrasting leather-coloured stitching. Like the Veloce, the Intensa is powered by the choice of 280-hp gasoline engine for the all-wheel drive and rear-wheel drive models, 210-hp diesel with all-wheel drive, or 160-hp diesel with rear-wheel drive.

=== Quadrifoglio Luna Rossa ===
The Alfa Romeo Giulia Quadrifoglio Luna Rossa was presented at the 2026 Brussels Motor Show, a special version of the Quadrifoglio with a dedicated livery and a style reminiscent of Prada's Luna Rossa America's Cup sailing ship, create from the collaboration with the Luna Rossa Team for the 38th America's Cup. The livery is an iridescent gray, with the Luna Rossa branding on a red stripe at the bottom of the doors and with a black stripe across the top that runs across the car and connects to the shield at the front of the car. Forged wheels that weigh only 9.3Kg at the rear and 8.73Kg at the front. Black and red wheels in the center section and red brake calipers. The interior is gray and has Luna Rossa red details, with red Alfa Romeo logos. At the rear, a striking two-section spoiler in black carbon fiber. This Luna Rossa was created by BottegaFuoriserie, in a limited series of 10, all already sold, a customization center designed for Alfa Romeo and Maserati exclusive clients.

== Giulia SWB Zagato ==
Unveiled in December 2022, the Alfa Romeo Giulia SWB Zagato is a one-off two-door model based on the Giulia, but with a shortened wheelbase, Tonale headlights and the GTAm special edition engine mated to a six-speed manual gearbox.

== Equipment and safety ==
ANCAP test results* Alfa Romeo Giulia 2.0L petrol & 2.2L diesel variants (2016, aligned with Euro NCAP)
Test	Points	%
Overall:	5 /5 stars	
Adult occupant:	37.3	98%
Child occupant:	39.7	81%
Pedestrian:	29.2	69%
Safety assist:	7.2	60%

Euro NCAP test results* Alfa Romeo Giulia (2016)
Test	Points	%
Overall:	5 /5 stars	
Adult occupant:	37.4	98%
Child occupant:	39.7	81%
Pedestrian:	29.2	69%
Safety assist:	7.3	60%

IIHS: 2017 Giulia
Category	Rating
Small overlap front	Good
Moderate overlap front	Good
Side	Good
Roof strength	Good
Head restraints & seats	Good

All Giulia models have active safety systems as standard, including the Forward Collision Warning (FCW) with Autonomous Emergency Brake (AEB) and pedestrian detection, IBS (Integrated Brake System) based on Continental MK C1 electronic brake control system, Lane Departure Warning (LDW) and cruise control with speed limiter. The Giulia is the first car in the world to use Continental MK C1 electronic brake system. Stopping distance from 62 mph (100 km/h) to 0 are 38.5 m (126 ft) for the Giulia and 32 m (105 ft) for the Quadrifoglio.

The Giulia was crash tested in June 2016 by EuroNCAP, with a score of 98% for the adult occupant protection — at the time the highest score ever achieved by any car, even with the introduction of a more stringent rating system in 2015. Overall the Giulia achieved five star results.

The Giulia was awarded on October 3, 2017, the Top Safety Pick+ award by Insurance Institute for Highway Safety (IIHS). The Giulia achieved the highest possible rating in each of the five tests. The TSP+ designation applies to any 2017 model-year Alfa Romeo Giulia produced after May 2017 equipped with Forward Collision Warning-Plus – an option at only $500 MSRP – and bi-xenon projector headlamps (35W) featuring adaptive forward lighting and auto-leveling.

== Production ==
The car is assembled at FCA Italy's Cassino Plant in the province of Frosinone, Central Italy. Pre-series production emerged in late August 2015, with full production and sales originally scheduled for November 2015 and February 2016, respectively. The official production of the Giulia started on 19 April 2016.

== Sales ==
Calendar Year	USA	Canada	Europe	Australia	Others	Total
2016	36	0	10,475	0	47	10,558
2017	8,904	596	24,679	639	431	35,159
2018	11,519	510	17,075	536	4,771	34,411
2019	8,704	242	10,932	303		
2020	8,203	188	7,436	193		
2021	7,634	200	6,297	323		
2022	5,091	209	5,230	287		
2023	3,461					
Total to date	50,901	1,945	82,124	2,281		

== Police car ==
=== Polizia di Stato ===
In 2016, the Polizia di Stato took delivery of two Alfa Romeo Giulia Veloce police patrol cars finished in a light blue paint with white stripes on the sides of the car with the words POLIZIA in block letters underneath together with the new Alfa Romeo Giulietta and the Jeep Renegade police cars.

=== Carabinieri ===
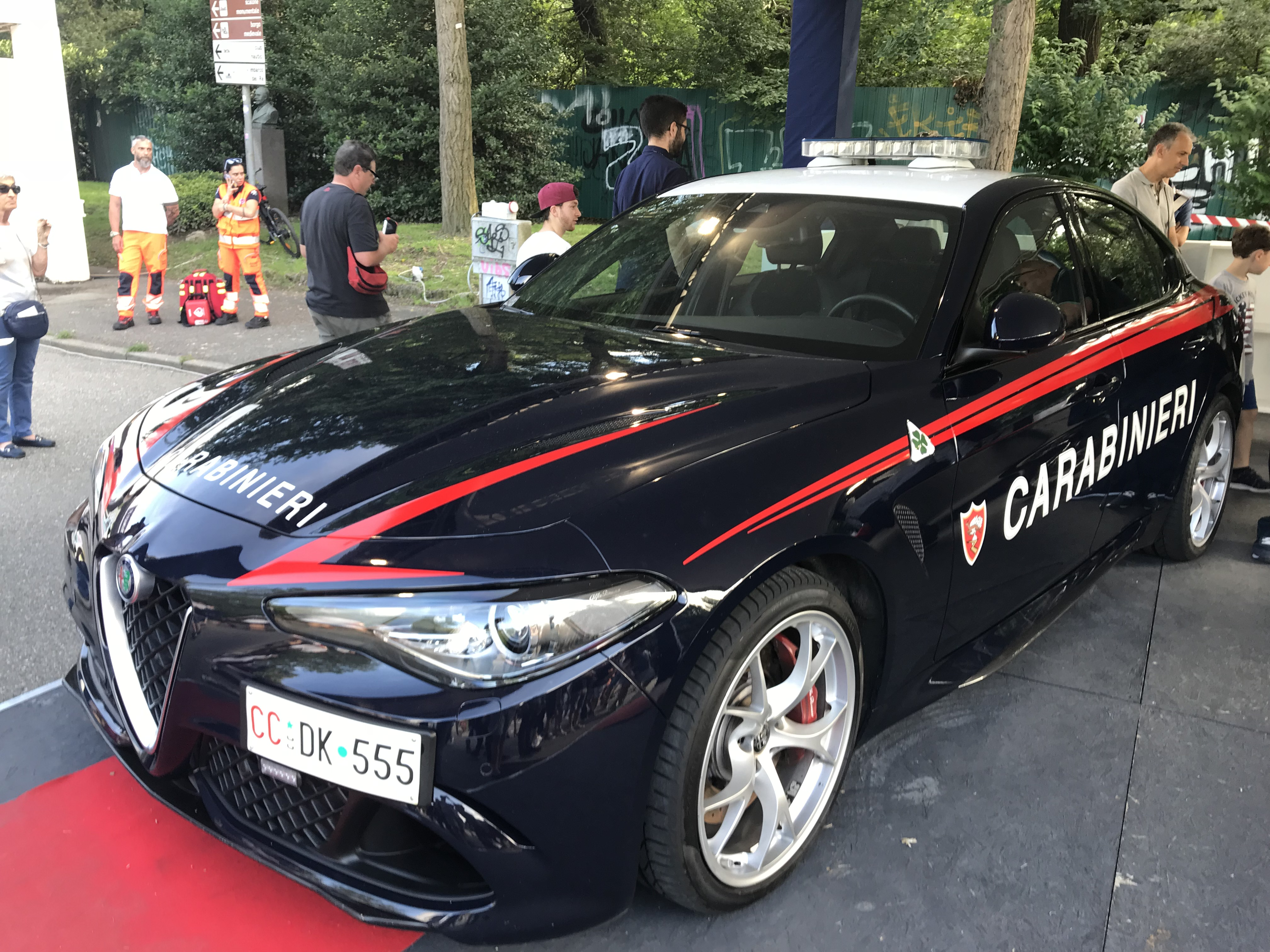
Giulia Quadrifoglio Carabinieri

The Carabinieri took delivery of two Alfa Romeo Giulia Quadrifoglios wrapped in navy blue paint, that appear virtually black. They sport red stripes over the car and have flashing lights over the chin spoilers with a white roof. Carabinieri cars are equipped with defibrillator, special portable cooling units, special radio system, additional emergency devices, a long weapon holder and rechargeable LED torches placed in the passenger compartment.

=== Guardia di Finanza ===
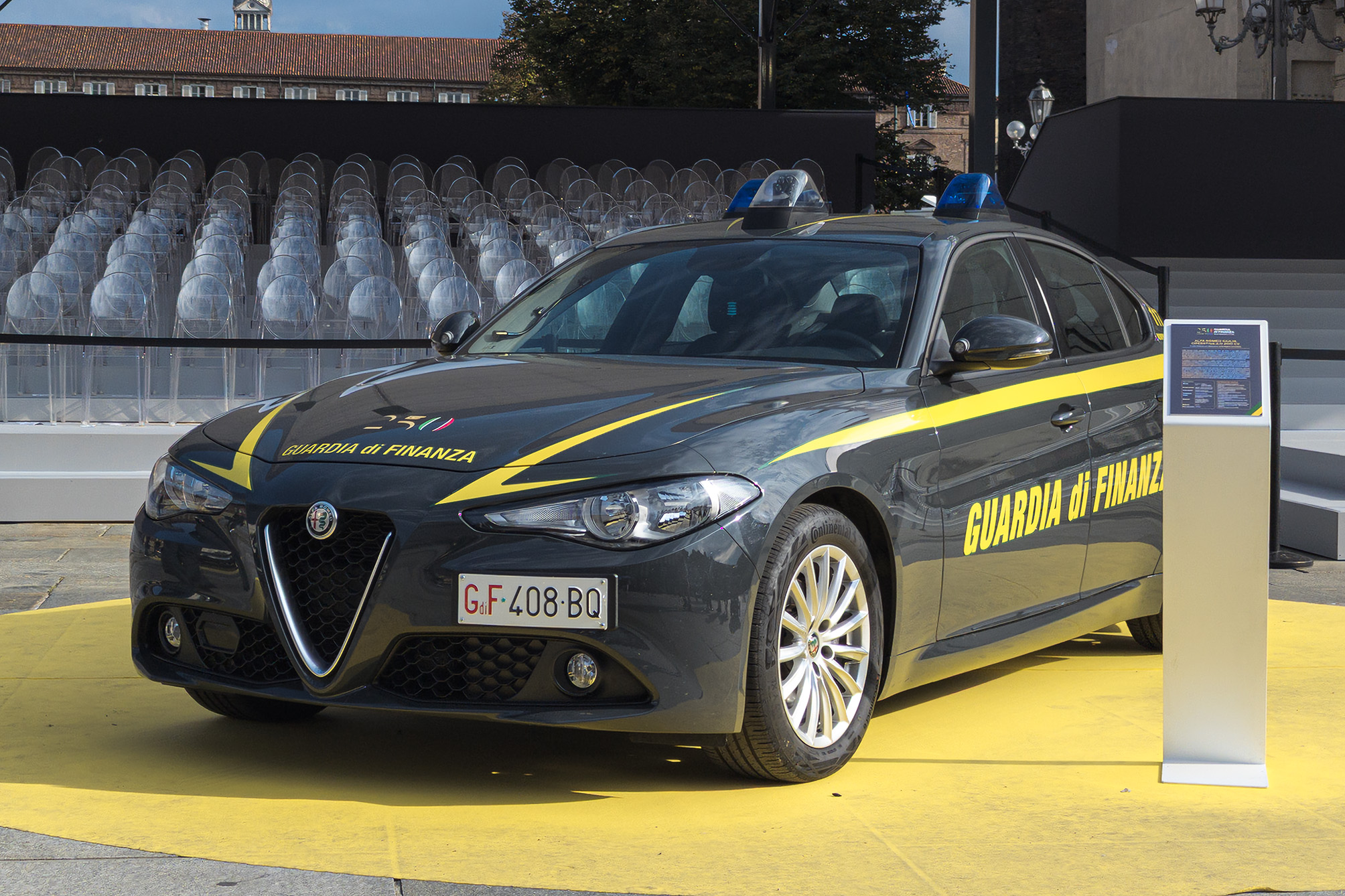
Alfa Romeo Giulia, presented in Turin on the occasion of the 250th anniversary of the Guardia di Finanza's founding.

In 2022, the Alfa Romeo Giulia 2.0 Turbo 200 CV AT8 becomes the standard vehicle of the Guardia di Finanza.

== Motorsport ==
=== Giulia ETCR ===
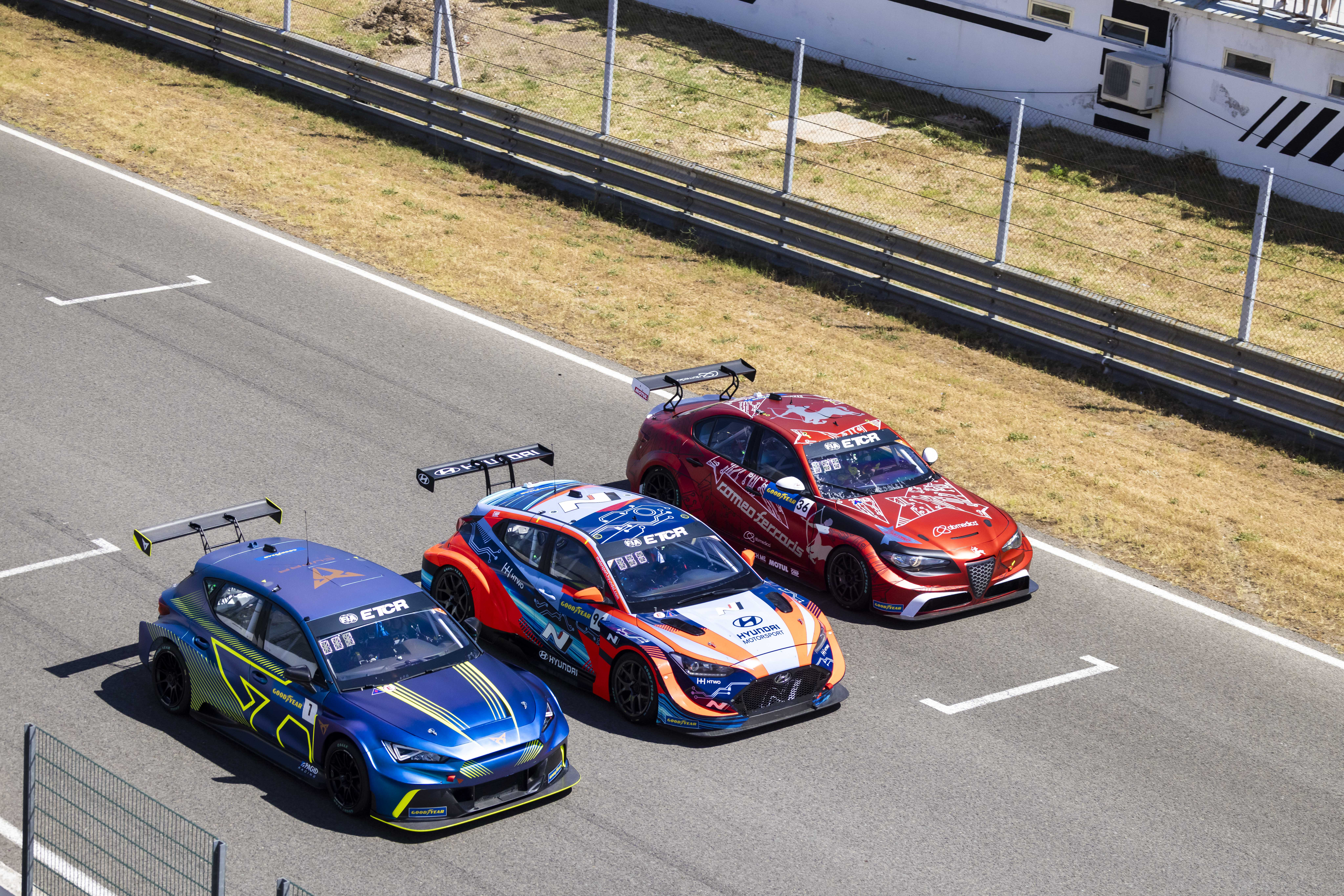
Giulia ETCR (right) lined up with its ETCR competitors, the Cupra e-Racer (left) and Veloster N ETCR (centre)

The Romeo Ferraris racing team and Hexathron Racing Systems announced in December 2019 they were developing a Giulia-based electric touring car racer for the PURE ETCR series. The inaugural season was held in 2021 and the car was campaigned again in 2022.

The Giulia ETCR was designed and engineered by Hexathron under lead engineer Maurizio Soro. As required by ETCR rules, the spec drivetrain and battery are supplied by ETCR promoters WSC Technology, with a rear-drive configuration featuring electronic torque vectoring and output power of up to 500 kW (670 hp) peak and 300 kW (400 hp) continuous.

== Awards ==
The highly awarded production car, has received many awards from automotive industry groups and media publishers, including following:

- EuroCarBody Award 2016
- Auto Europa 2017
- Das Goldene Lenkrad: The most beautiful car of 2016
- 2017 Driver's Choice Award for Best New Luxury Car
- 2017 Auto del Año (Car of the Year) in Mid-size Sedan Segment by Hispanic Motor Press
- 2016 BBC Top Gear 'Magazine Awards: Car of the Year' title and the inaugural public vote for 'Car of 2016'
- Best Car 2017 - German magazine Auto, Motor und Sport
- Croatian Auto Klub magazine award: Croauto 2017
- 2017 Newcomer of the Year, Quattroruote
- All-new 2017 Alfa Romeo Giulia Quadrifoglio Named Best "Luxury Performance Car" of 2017 by New York Daily News Autos Team
- Wards 10 Best Interiors
- 2017 Alfa Romeo Giulia Quadrifoglio Wins "Super Sedan" in Popular Mechanics’ Automotive Excellence Awards
- 2017 10 Best Interiors List by WardsAuto
- 2017 Alfa Romeo Giulia Quadrifoglio named "Car of Texas" and "Performance Sedan of Texas" and took home "Most Drives" honor
- 2017 Sport Auto Award 2017 - German car magazine Sport Auto
- 2017 Evo Car of the Year best sports saloon
- 2017 Evo Car of the Year best super saloon
- 2018 Motor Trend Car of the Year
- Car and Driver 10Best for 2018
- 2018 Car And Driver ‘Editors’ Choice’
- Sport Auto Award 2018 Giulia Quadrifoglio top pick of category 'Imported Standard Sedans/Station Wagons up to 100,000 Euro' by Sport auto (Germany)
- Sport Auto Award 2018 Giulia Veloce wins in category 'Imported Standard Sedans/Station Wagons up to 50,000 Euro'. by Sport auto (Germany)
- 2019 Readers' choice awards by the Auto, Motor und sport
- 2019 Auto Bild magazine win of "Design" category "Best Brands" competition.
- 2020 What Car? Performance Car of the Year
