= Santa Giulia, Lucca =

Church building in Lucca, Italy

Coordinates: 43°50′34.32″N 10°30′24.56″E

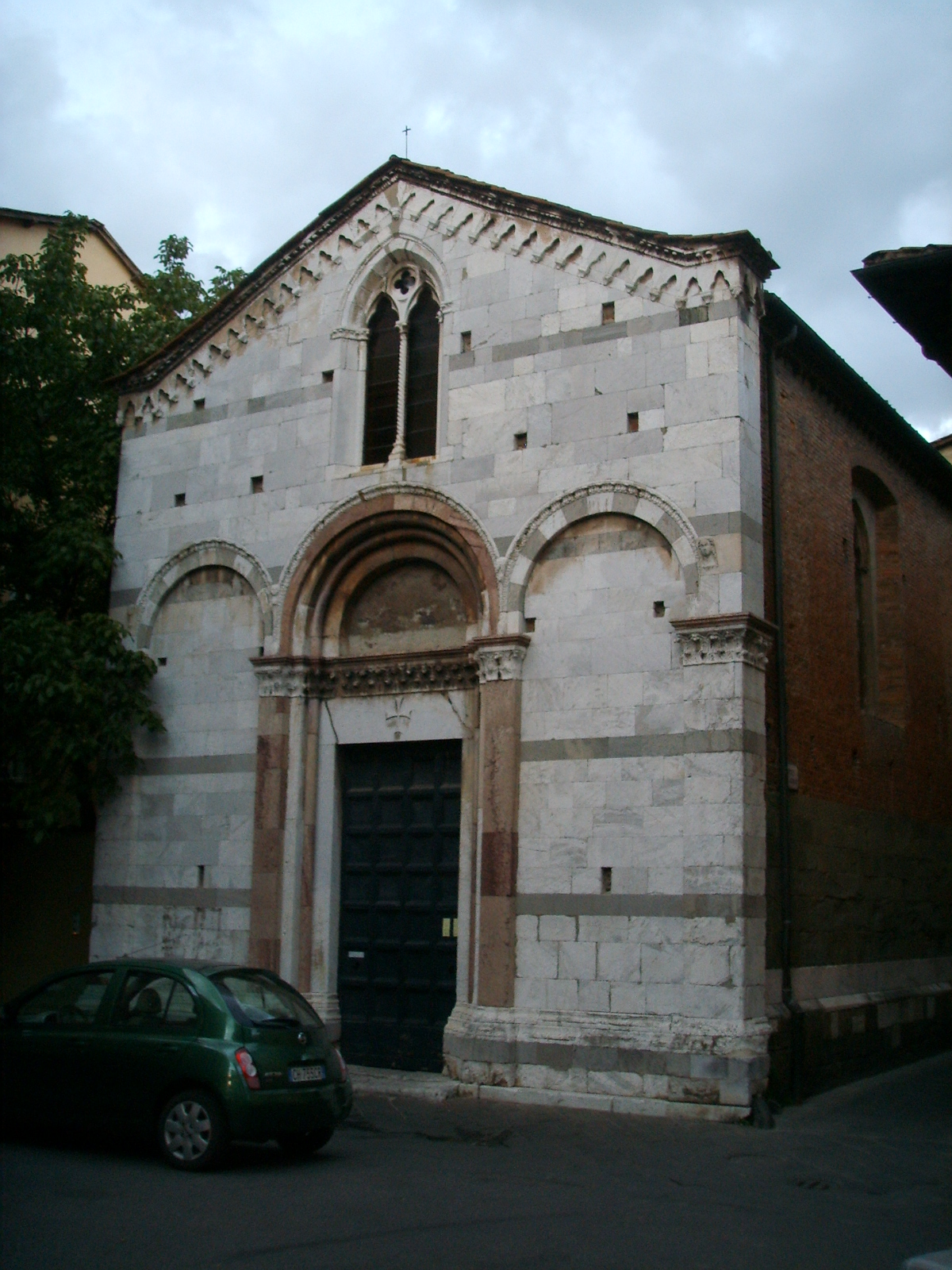
Church of Santa Giulia.

Santa Giulia is Roman Catholic church in Lucca, region of Tuscany, Italy.

== History ==
The church is documented since as early as the 10th century, but it is more ancient, as testified by the Lombard tombs in the interior. It was rebuilt in the 13th century in brickwork, while the façade was completed in the mid-14th century by Coluccio di Collo.

The use of blind arcades in the façade is a transitional element from Romanesque to Gothic architecture. The upper part of the façade dates to a later period.

The interior was modified several times. The current high altar was added in 1647 by commission of the Bernardini family, to house an ancient and venerated image of the Crucifixion. The church once housed a 12th-century Cross, now in the Cathedral of Lucca.

== Sources ==
- Bergamaschi, G. (2006). "S. Giulia a Lucca: la chiesa e il culto della santa". Nuova Rivista Storica (90): 763–782.
