= Amalfi (disambiguation) =

Amalfi is an Italian town.

Amalfi may also refer to:

== Places ==
- Duchy of Amalfi or Republic of Amalfi, a de facto independent state centred on Amalfi during the tenth and eleventh centuries
- Amalfi Drive, a stretch of road between the Italian towns of Amalfi and Sorrento
- Amalfi, Antioquia, a town and municipality in Colombia

== Ships ==
- Italian cruiser Amalfi, sunk in the First World War
- Amalfi, a later name of the ferry TS Leda

== Other uses ==
- Amalfi: Rewards of the Goddess, a 2009 Japanese film
- Amalfi – Sarah Brightman Love Songs, an album released in conjunction with the film
- Amalfi, a song by the band Hooverphonic
- Amalfi Award, presented by St John Ambulance
- John Amalfi, main character in the Cities in Flight science fiction novels
- Kinzie Hotel, formerly the Amalfi Hotel Chicago
- Yeso Amalfi (born 1925), Brazilian former footballer
- Ferrari Amalfi, a latest grand tourer
