= Transaxle =

Combined transmission, axle and differential in one assembly

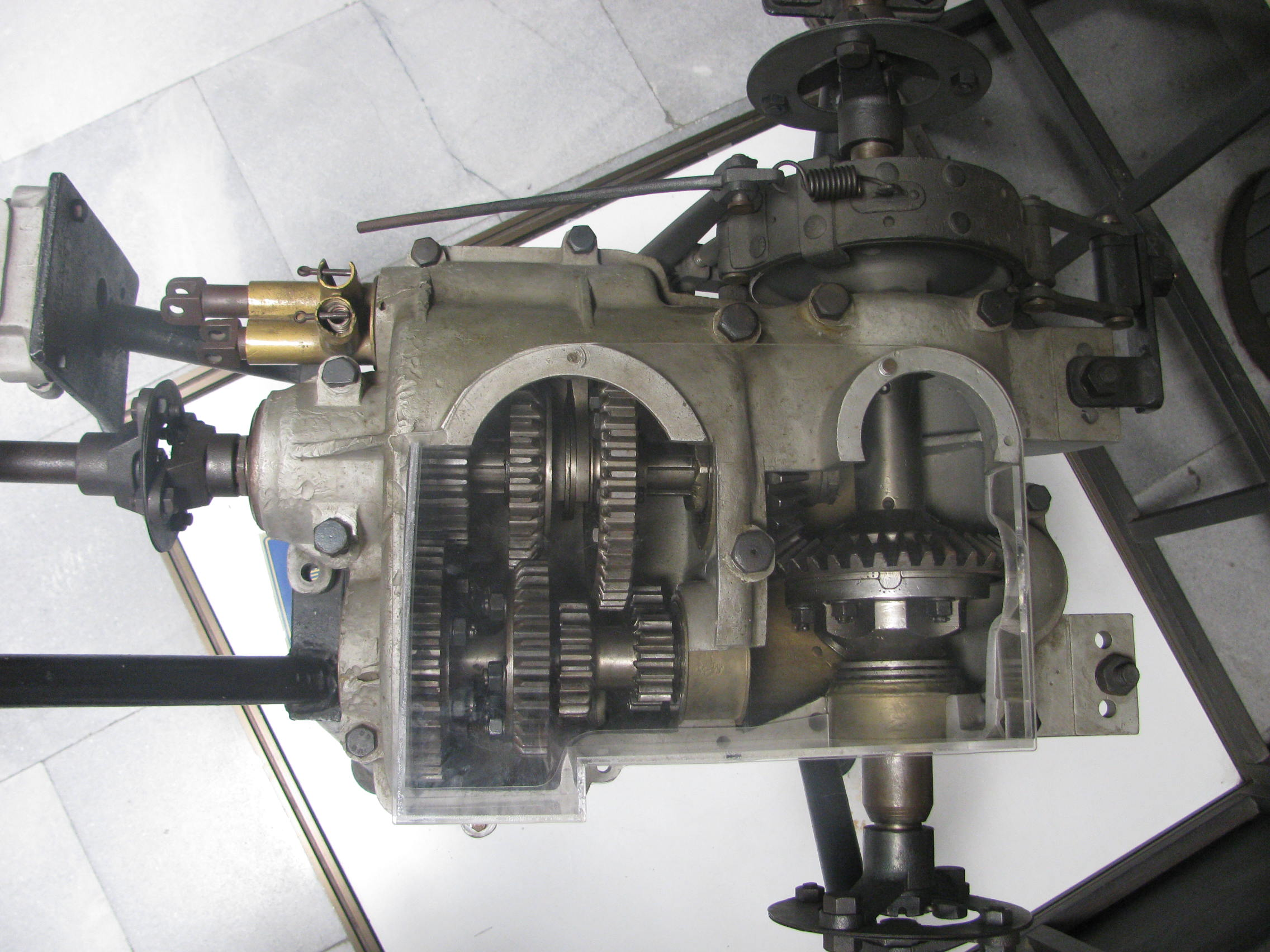
Csonka transaxle from 1908

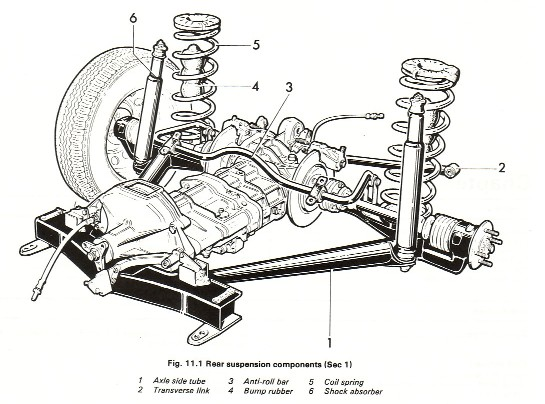
Drawing of the "Alfa Transaxle" layout, with gearbox mounted in block at the rear differential; also inboard brakes to reduce unsprung mass

A transaxle is a single mechanical device which combines the functions of an automobile's transmission, axle, and differential into one integrated assembly. It can be produced in both manual and automatic versions.

== Engine and drive at the same end ==
Transaxles are nearly universal in all automobile configurations that have the engine placed at the same end of the car as the driven wheels: the front-engine/front-wheel-drive; rear-engine/rear-wheel-drive; and mid-engine/rear-wheel-drive arrangements.

Many mid- and rear-engined vehicles use a transverse engine and transaxle, similar to a front-wheel-drive unit. Others use a longitudinal engine and transaxle like Ferrari's 1989 Mondial t which used a "T" arrangement with a longitudinal engine connected to a transverse transaxle. Front-wheel-drive versions of modern Audis, from the A4 upwards, along with their related marques from the Volkswagen Group (which share the same automobile layout) also use a similar layout, but with the transaxle also mounted longitudinally.

The front-wheel-drive Renault 16 had a longitudinal engine and transaxle, with the engine behind the transaxle. The transaxle case was designed to allow the final-drive ring gear to be on either side of the pinion; this allowed the engine-transaxle assembly to be used in the rear-wheel-drive Lotus Europa, which had the engine in front of the transaxle (i.e., mid-engined).

== Front-engine, rear-wheel-drive transaxles ==
Front-engine, rear-wheel-drive vehicles tend to have the transmission up front just after the engine, but sometimes a front-engine drives a rear-mounted transaxle. This is generally done for reasons of weight distribution and is therefore common on sports cars. Another advantage is that since the driveshaft spins at engine speed, it only has to endure the torque of the engine instead of the torque multiplied by the 1st gear ratio. This design was pioneered in the 1934 Škoda Popular, and then in the 1950 Lancia Aurelia, designed by Vittorio Jano.

Since this placement of the gearbox is unsuitable for a live axle (due to excessive unsprung mass), the rear suspension is either independent, or uses a de Dion tube (notably in Alfa Romeos). Rare exceptions to this rule were the Bugatti T46 and T50 which had a three speed gearbox on a live axle.

Notable front-engine, rear-wheel-drive vehicles with a transaxle design include:

- 1898–1910 De Dion Bouton
- 1914–1939 Stutz Bearcat
- 1929–1936 Bugatti Type 46
- 1934–1944 Škoda Popular
- 1950–1958 Lancia Aurelia
- 1951–1956 Pegaso Z-102
- 1957–1970 Lancia Flaminia
- 1959–1963 DAF 600
- 1961–1963 Pontiac Tempest
- 1964–1968 Ferrari 275
- 1963–1968 Ferrari 330
- 1968–1973 Ferrari 365 GTB/4 "Daytona"
- 1972–1984 Alfa Romeo Alfetta
- 1974–1987 Alfa Romeo Alfetta GT/GTV and GTV/GTV6
- 1976–1988 Porsche 924
- 1976–1991 Volvo 300 series
- 1977–1985 Alfa Romeo Giulietta (116)
- 1978–1995 Porsche 928
- 1982–1995 Porsche 944 and Porsche 968
- 1984–1987 Alfa Romeo 90
- 1985–1992 Alfa Romeo 75/Milano
- 1989–1991 Alfa Romeo SZ/RZ
- 1992–2003 Ferrari 456
- 1996–2005 Ferrari 550/Ferrari 575M
- 1997–2004 Chevrolet Corvette C5
- 1997–1999 Panoz Esperante GTR-1
- 1997–2002 Plymouth Prowler
- 1998–2005 Shelby Series 1
- 2001–2007 Maserati Coupé and Spyder
- 2004–2016 Aston Martin DB9
- 2004 Peugeot 907 Concept
- 2004–2009 Cadillac XLR
- 2004–2013 Chevrolet Corvette C6
- 2004–2011 Ferrari 612 Scaglietti
- 2004–2012 Maserati Quattroporte
- 2005–2017 Aston Martin V8 Vantage
- 2006–2012 Ferrari 599 GTB Fiorano
- 2007–2010 Alfa Romeo 8C Competizione
- 2007–2019 Maserati GranTurismo/GranCabrio
- 2007–2024 Nissan GT-R
- 2008–2018 Ferrari California/California T
- 2009–2012 Lexus LF-A
- 2010–2020 Aston Martin Rapide
- 2010–2013 Mercedes-Benz SLS AMG
- 2012–present Aston Martin Vanquish
- 2017–present Ferrari F12berlinetta
- 2014–2019 Chevrolet Corvette C7
- 2014–present Mercedes-AMG GT
- 2017–2023 Ferrari Portofino/Portofino M
- 2020–present Ferrari Roma
- 2024–present Ferrari 12Cilindri
- 2025–present Ford Mustang GTD

Note: The C5, C6 and C7 Corvettes, produced in the 1997 to 2019 model years, do not feature an integrated transaxle, where the transmission, axle and differential are combined into a single assembly. These years actually featured a rear-mounted transmission, which was a stand-alone unit bolted directly to the differential. While many, including General Motors, refer to this configuration as a transaxle, the first Corvette with an integrated transaxle was produced in the eighth generation Corvette, which was released in the 2020 model year.

== Rear-engine, rear-wheel-drive transaxles ==
Volkswagen and later Porsche made extensive use of transaxles in their rear (and mid) engined vehicles. Over the years, models adopting this configuration have included:

- 1921–1925 Rumpler Tropfenwagen
- 1938–2003 Volkswagen Beetle
- 1940–1945 Volkswagen Kübelwagen (Type 82)
- 1941–1944 Volkswagen Schwimmwagen (Type 166)
- 1947–1961 Renault 4CV
- 1948–1965 Porsche 356
- 1950–1990 Volkswagen Type 2 T1-T3
- 1955–1974 Volkswagen Karmann Ghia
- 1960–1969 Chevrolet Corvair
- 1961–1973 Volkswagen Type 3
- 1963–1976 Hillman Imp
- 1963–present Porsche 911
- 1964–1969 Škoda 1000 MB
- 1965–1969, 1976 Porsche 912
- 1967–1973 Matra 530 (mid-engined)
- 1967–1973 Lamborghini Miura (mid-engined)
- 1968–1974 Volkswagen Type 4
- 1969–1976 Porsche 914 (mid-engined)
- 1969–1980 Škoda 100, Škoda 110 R
- 1971–1978 Maserati Bora
- 1971–1992 De Tomaso Pantera
- 1973–1980 Matra Bagheera (mid-engined)
- 1976–1990 Škoda 105/120/130, Škoda Garde/Rapid
- 1980–1983 Matra Murena (mid-engined)
- 1981–1983 DeLorean
- 1984–1988 Pontiac Fiero (mid-engined)
- 1991–1995 Cizeta-Moroder V16T (mid-engined)
- 2013–present Praga R1 (mid-engined)
- 2020–present Chevrolet Corvette C8

== Four-wheel-drive ==
All Audi cars with longitudinal engines and their 'trademark' quattro four-wheel-drive (4WD) system, along with their related marques from the Volkswagen Group which share the same layout, utilise a transaxle. This is mounted immediately behind the front-mounted engine (again, longitudinally) and contains the 'gearbox' (manual, automatic, DSG, or CVT), along with both the centre differential, and the front differential and final drive unit.

The Nissan GT-R and Ferrari FF (and its successors) are unusual in being all-wheel-drive cars with front-engined layouts and rear-mounted transaxles. In the Nissan, one driveshaft sends power to the transaxle (which also contains the 'center' differential) and another driveshaft sends power back along the car to the front wheels. In the Ferrari, the rear transaxle works in a conventional manner, whilst the drive to the front wheels comes from a separate gearbox at the front of the engine.

Other 4WD applications include:

- 1979–2002 Volkswagen Vanagon/Caravelle Syncro Edition - rear-engined, transaxle in the front;
- 1984–1986 Ford RS200 – mid-engined, with the gearbox in the front;
- 1989–2001 Mitsubishi 3000GT - front-engined, gearbox (transmission, front and centre differential) in the front;
- 2007–on Nissan GT-R – front-engined, gearbox in the rear.
- 2011–2016 Ferrari FF

== See also ==
- Hybrid Synergy Drive
- Powertrain
- Drivetrain
- Transfer case
