= Ferrari Amalfi =

2025 grand touring car by Ferrari

Overview
- Manufacturer: Ferrari
- Production: 2026–present
- Assembly: Italy: Maranello
- Designer: Ferrari Styling Centre under Flavio Manzoni

Body and chassis
- Class: Grand tourer (S)
- Body style: 2-door 2+2 coupé; 2-door 2+2 convertible
- Layout: Front mid-engine, rear-wheel-drive
- Platform: Ferrari FR-L

Powertrain
- Engine: 3.9 L F154 BH twin-turbo V8
- Power output: 471 kW (640 PS; 631 hp)
- Transmission: 8-speed Magna 8DCL900 dual-clutch

Dimensions
- Wheelbase: 2,670 mm (105.1 in)
- Length: 4,656 mm (183.3 in)
- Width: 1,974 mm (77.7 in)
- Height: 1,301 mm (51.2 in)
- Curb weight: 1,570 kg (3,461 lb)

Chronology
- Predecessor: Ferrari Roma

The Ferrari Amalfi (Type F169M) is a grand touring car produced by Italian manufacturer Ferrari. It was unveiled on 1 July 2025, as the successor to the Ferrari Roma and continuing with the Roma's traditional, front mid-engine, rear-wheel-drive layout. The car is named after the village of Amalfi on the Gulf of Salerno.

== Design ==
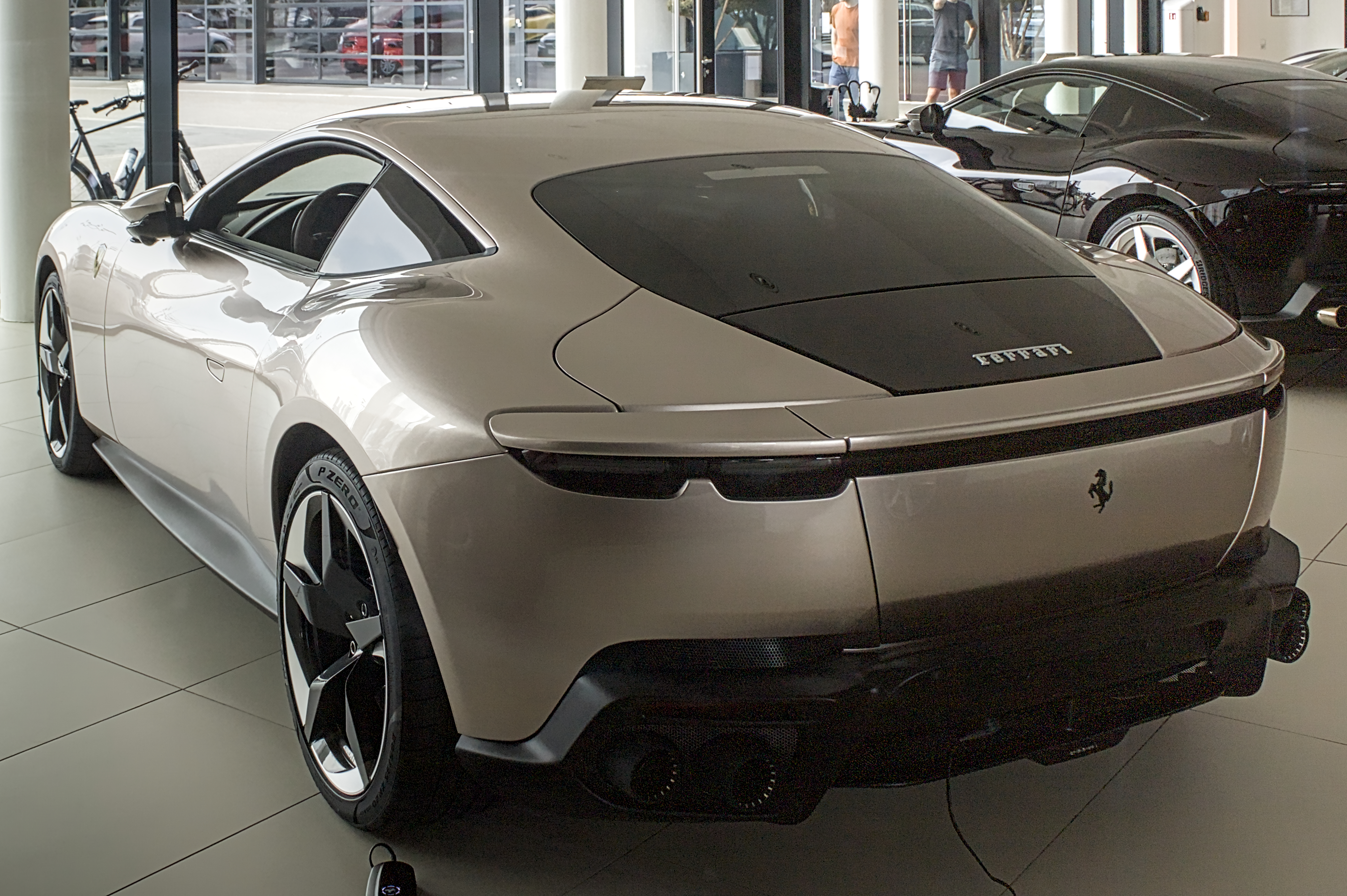
Rear view

Despite the Amalfi design being an evolution of the Roma, the only shared component of the bodywork is the glass.

== Specifications ==
The Ferrari Amalfi is powered by an updated version of the 3.9-litre (3,855 cc), twin-turbocharged V8 engine from the F154 family. Output is increased to 640 PS (471 kW; 631 hp), a gain of around 20 PS over the Roma, while torque remains at 561 lb⋅ft (761 N⋅m).

Mechanical changes include revised turbochargers spinning up to 171,000 rpm, a new engine control unit, and a raised redline of 7,600 rpm. Power is sent to the rear wheels via an 8-speed dual-clutch transmission.

The chassis features recalibrated magnetorheological dampers and a new brake-by-wire system. The active rear spoiler now has three positions, acting as an airbrake when fully deployed. Ferrari states the Amalfi accelerates from 0–100 km/h (62 mph) in 3.3 seconds and has a top speed of over 320 km/h (200 mph).

== Amalfi Spider ==
A convertible version, Ferrari Amalfi Spider, was unveiled 12 March 2026. The convertible mechanism is expected to add weight and increase the price over the coupé.

Ferrari Amalfi Spider

Amalfi Spider; rear view

Amalfi Spider interior
