= Ferrari Roma =

Grand touring sports car designed and manufactured by Ferrari

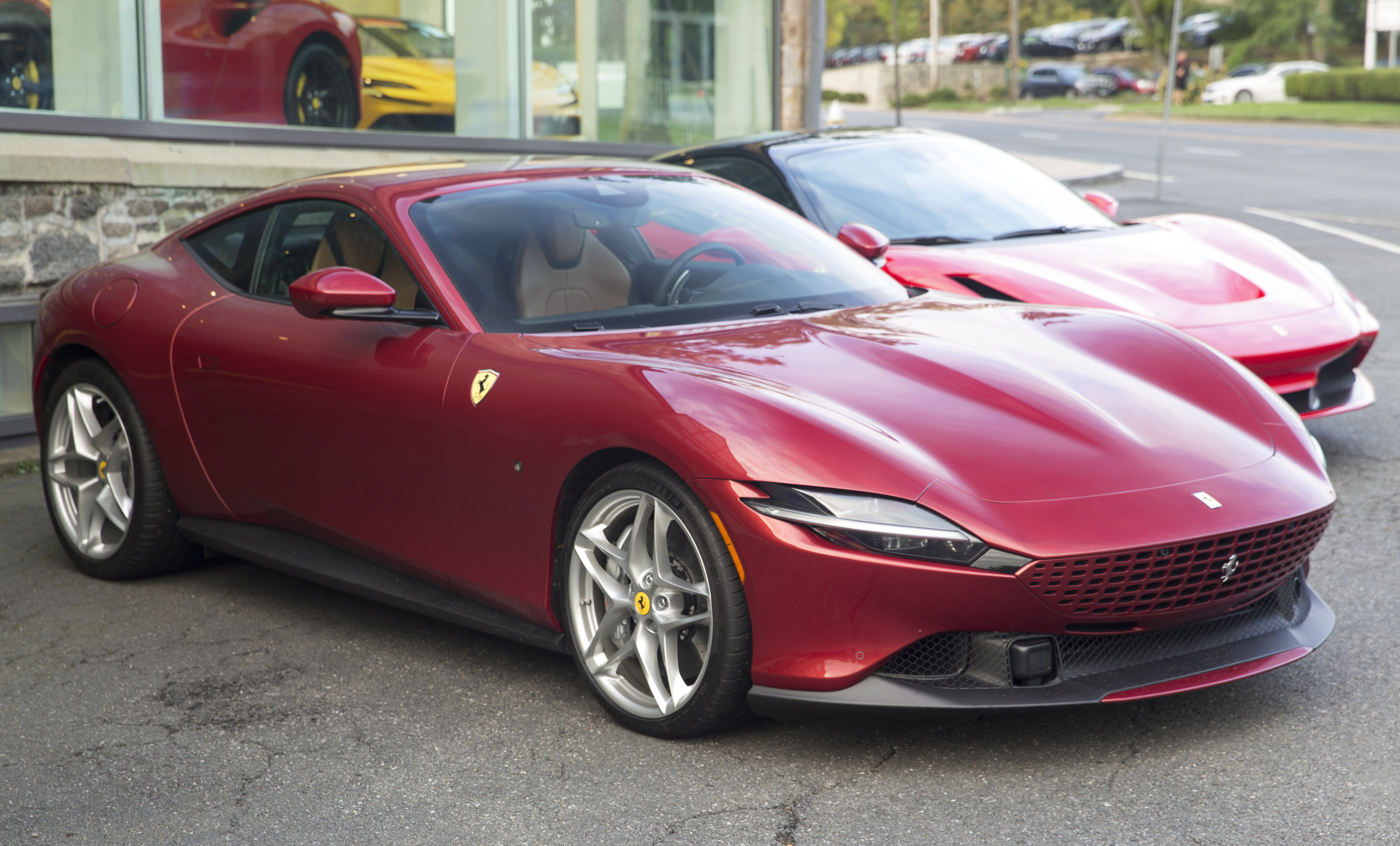
- Ferrari Roma

Overview
- Manufacturer: Ferrari
- Production: Coupé: 2020–2024; Spider: 2023–2026
- Assembly: Italy: Maranello
- Designer: Ferrari Styling Centre under Flavio Manzoni

Body and chassis
- Class: Grand tourer (S)
- Body style: 2-door 2+2 coupé; 2-door 2+2 convertible
- Layout: Front mid-engine, rear-wheel-drive
- Related: Ferrari Portofino; Ferrari Amalfi

Powertrain
- Engine: 3.9 L F154 BH twin-turbo V8
- Power output: 456 kW; 612 hp (620 PS)
- Transmission: 8-speed Magna 8DCL900 dual-clutch

Dimensions
- Wheelbase: 2,670 mm (105.1 in)
- Length: 4,656 mm (183.3 in)
- Width: 1,974 mm (77.7 in)
- Height: 1,301 mm (51.2 in)
- Kerb weight: 1,570 kg (3,461 lb)

Chronology
- Predecessor: Ferrari Portofino
- Successor: Ferrari Amalfi

The Ferrari Roma (Type F169) is a grand touring car by Italian manufacturer Ferrari. It has a front mid-engine, rear-wheel-drive layout with a twin turbocharged V8 engine and a 2+2 seating arrangement. Based on the Ferrari Portofino, the car succeeds the Portofino and sits below the Ferrari F8 in Ferrari's range of sports cars.

The vehicle was named after Rome, Italy's capital. It was originally introduced online on 13 November 2019 with a coupé bodystyle. Ferrari then unveiled the car the next day in Rome. A soft-top convertible version of the Roma was introduced in 2023.

== Design ==
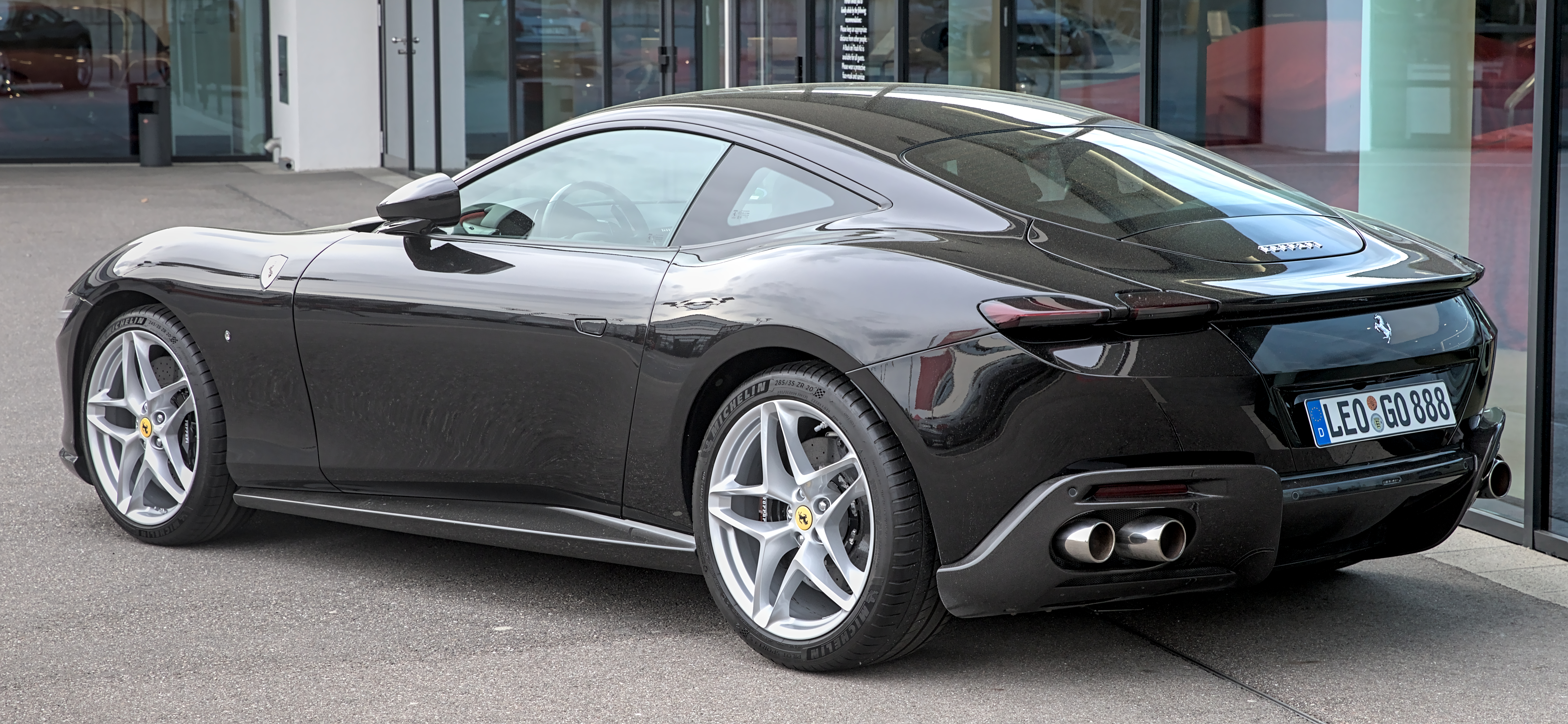
Rear view

The exterior design was influenced by the Ferrari 250 GT Lusso and 250 GT 2+2 grand touring cars. The Roma's design features include flush door handles, slim LED lights at the front and rear, and an active rear spoiler that sits flush when the car is driven softly. The car's design won a Red Dot award.

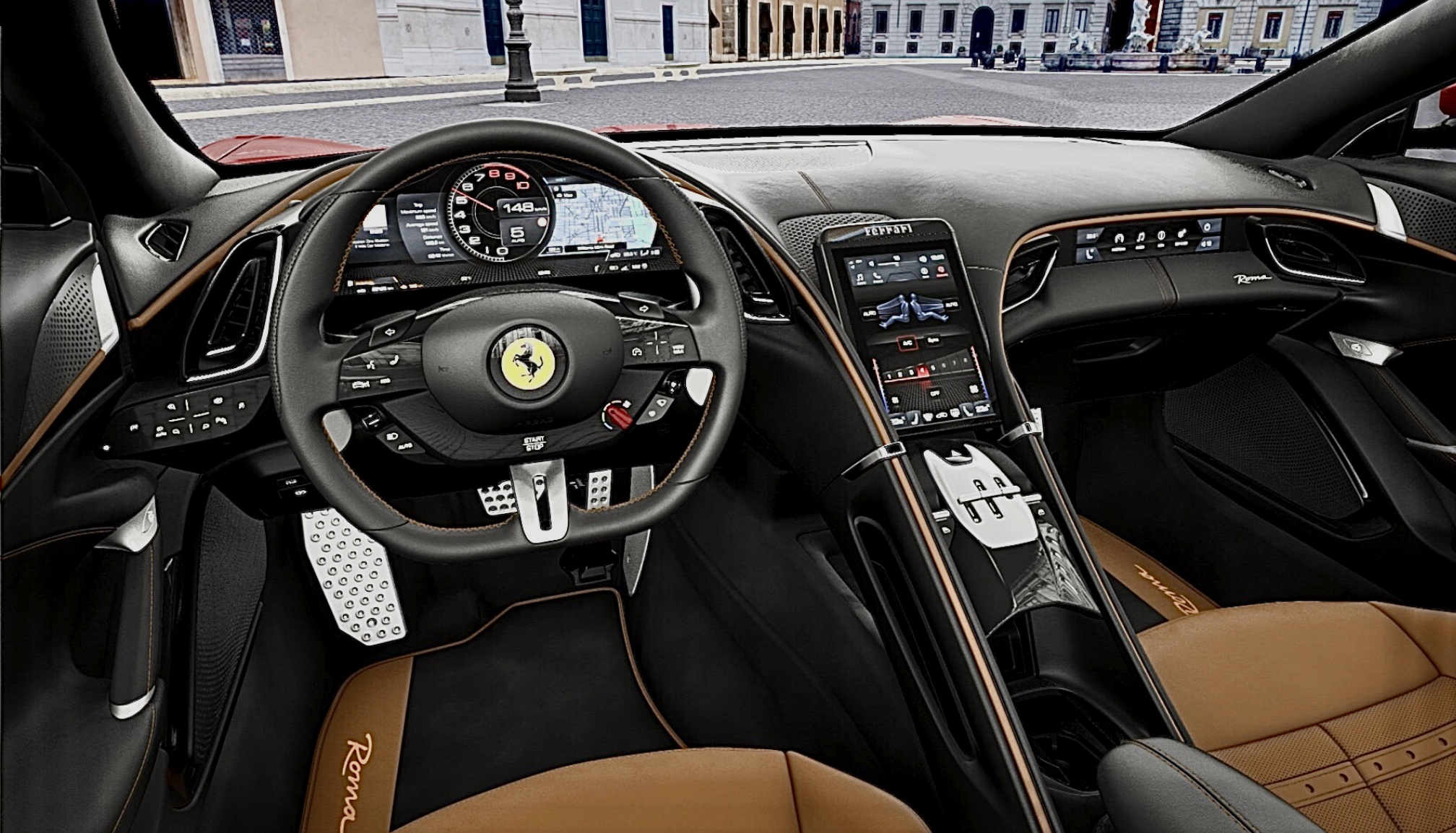
Roma dual cockpit interior

The interior is described by Ferrari as a "2+2" interior with a small backseat area. The dashboard features digital instrumentation (a 16.0-inch wrap-around touch screen) and a multi-function steering wheel (both shared with the SF90 Stradale) for the driver. The trim piece running through the center of the interior separates the driver and the passenger and is integrated into the dashboard. A centrally mounted 8.4-inch portrait touch screen controls most of the car's functions. A third horizontal touchscreen integrated into the passenger side dashboard is offered as an option. This display allows the passenger access to the HVAC, multimedia, and navigation controls and also allows them to view the performance metrics of the car. A newly designed key allows the driver to open the doors of the car with the push of a button near the flush door handles.

== Specifications and performance ==
=== Engine and transmission ===
The Roma is powered by the Ferrari F154 engine. It is a 3.9 litres (3,855 cc), turbocharged, 90 degree V-8, dual overhead cam (DOHC) design. The Roma's type 154BH is rated at 456 kW; 612 hp (620 PS) between 5,750 and 7,500 rpm and 761 N⋅m (561 lb⋅ft) of torque between 3,000 and 5,750 rpm.

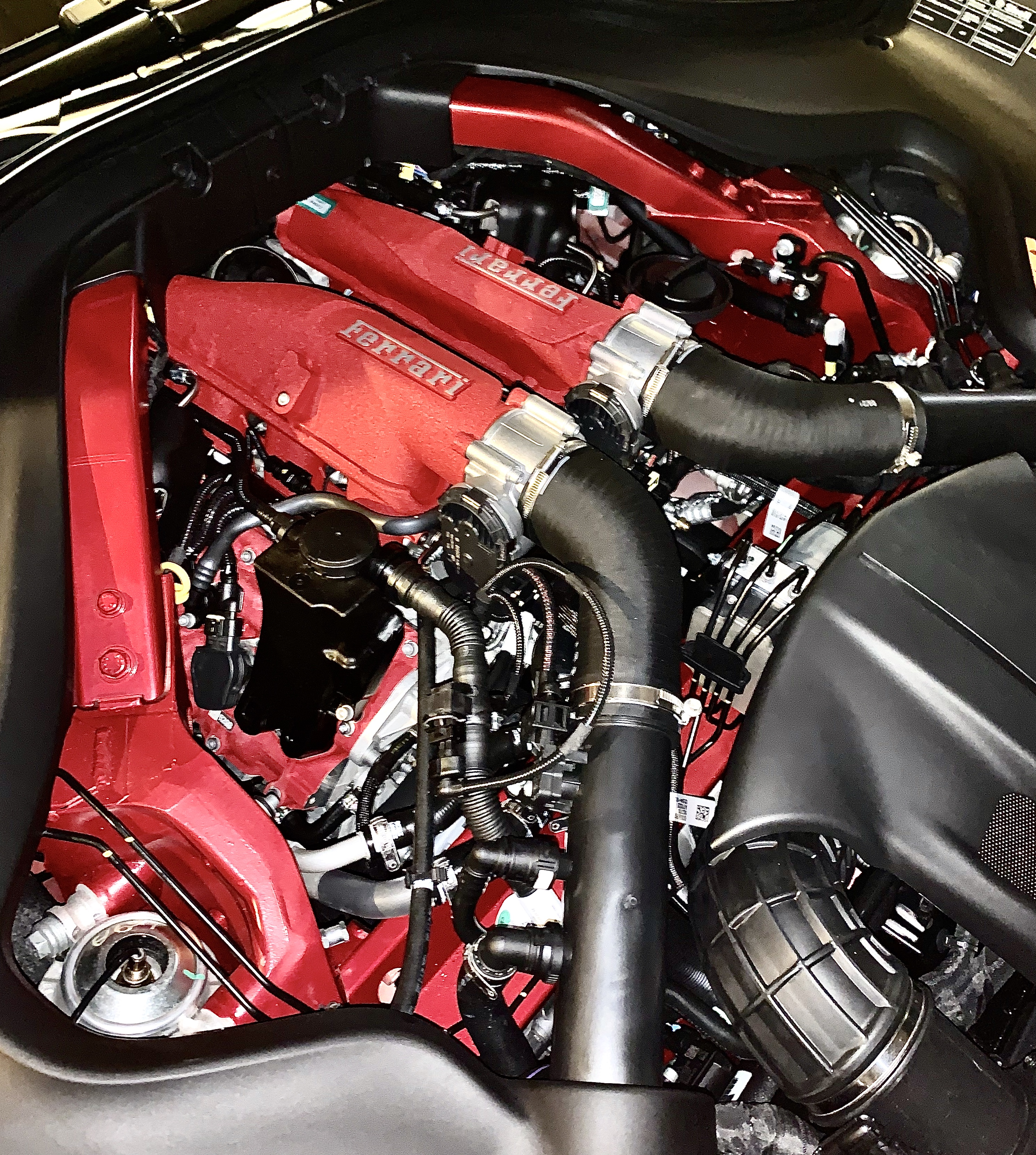
Ferrari Roma Type 154 Engine

The forced induction air intake system uses twin parallel water cooled turbochargers and two air-to-air intercoolers. The dry sump lubrication system helps prevent oil starvation during high g-force operation.

The engine is mated to the new 8-speed dual-clutch transmission shared with the SF90 Stradale. This new unit translates into more acceleration in the intermediate gears with an extended tall top gear for motorway cruising. Ferrari says there is 15 percent more longitudinal pull in third gear when compared to the previous generation's 7-speed unit. The transaxle is equipped with an electronic differential and a mechanical reverse gear which contrasts to the SF90's electric motor reverse. This design weighs 6 kg (13 lb) less than the 7-speed unit used in the Portofino and is claimed to provide quicker and smoother shifting. Much of the weight savings is due to the dry sump design and the primary alloy oil case that is compact and wrapped tightly around the various engine components.

=== Weight ===
The Roma was engineered to weigh 200 kg (441 lb) less than the Portofino while being based on the same platform. This was achieved through a more rigid body structure and the overall use of lighter parts. Ferrari claims that 70 percent of the parts used on the Roma are new as compared to the Portofino. With the lightweight components, the car's dry weight is 1,472 kg (3,245 lb). Its curb weight (without the driver) is 1,570 kg (3,461 lb). The published weight distribution is 50% front to 50% rear.

=== Aerodynamics ===
The dynamic rear wing self-activates at high speed to help the vehicle generate downforce. The wing's three positions are low drag (flush (0–100 kph), medium downforce (100–300 kph), and high downforce (100–300 kph cornering and braking). The maximum deployment is rated at 95 kg (209 lb) of downforce at 250 km/h (155 mph). The rear spoiler is complemented by a pair of underbody vortex generators that create a ground effect and manage the wake of the front wheels to ensure efficient load management.

=== Performance ===
The Roma's published top speed is > 320 km/h (199 mph). Performance figures include a 0–100 km/h (0–62 mph) acceleration time of 3.4 seconds and a 0–200 km/h (0–124 mph) acceleration time of 9.3 seconds. The Roma's dry weight-to-power ratio is best in class at 2.37 kg/PS (5.3 lb/hp). The Roma has an EPA rated fuel economy of 17/22 city/highway, and 19 mpg_{‑US} (12.4 L/100 km; 22.8 mpg_{‑imp}) combined.

== Roma Spider ==
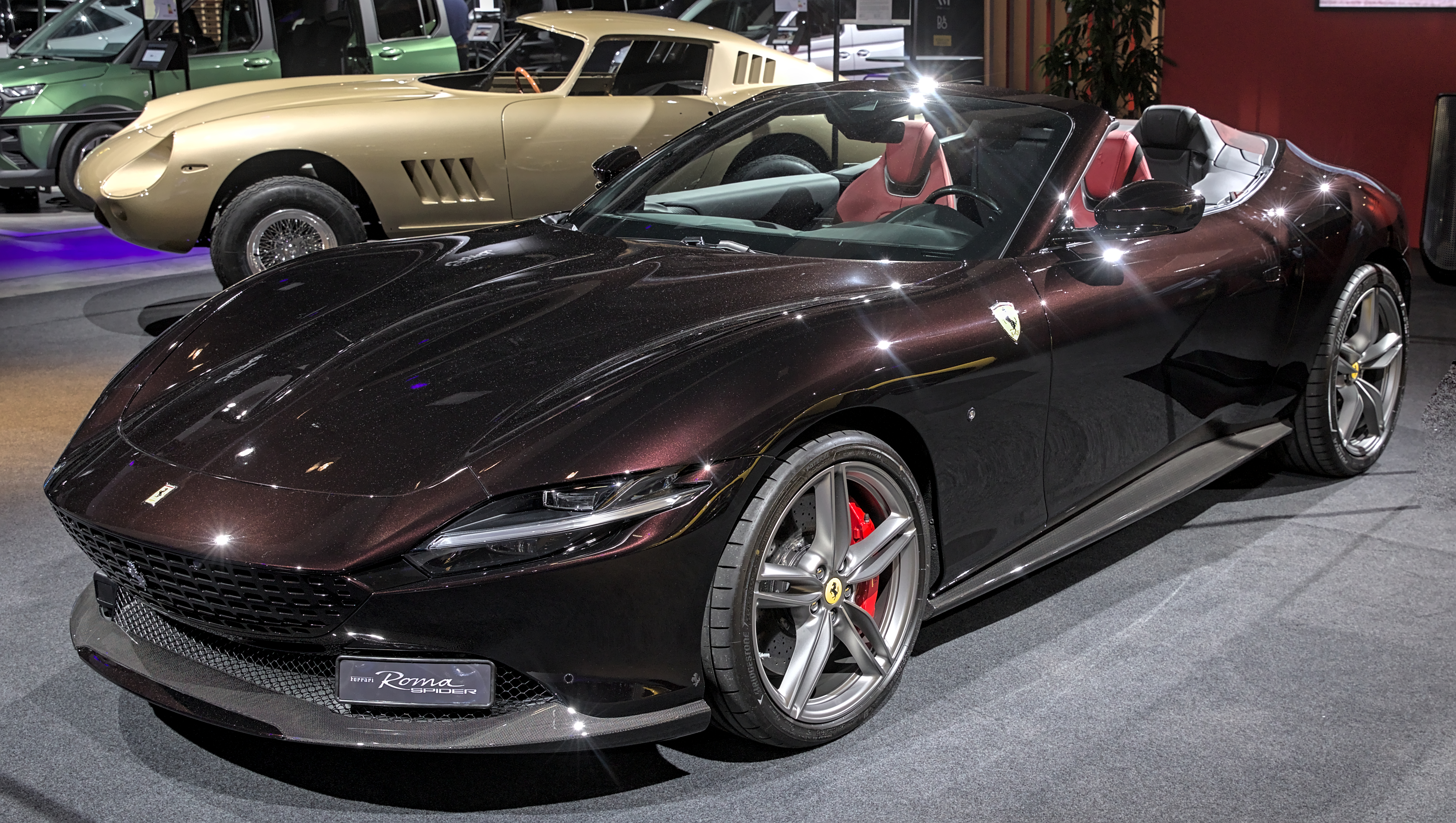
Ferrari Roma Spider

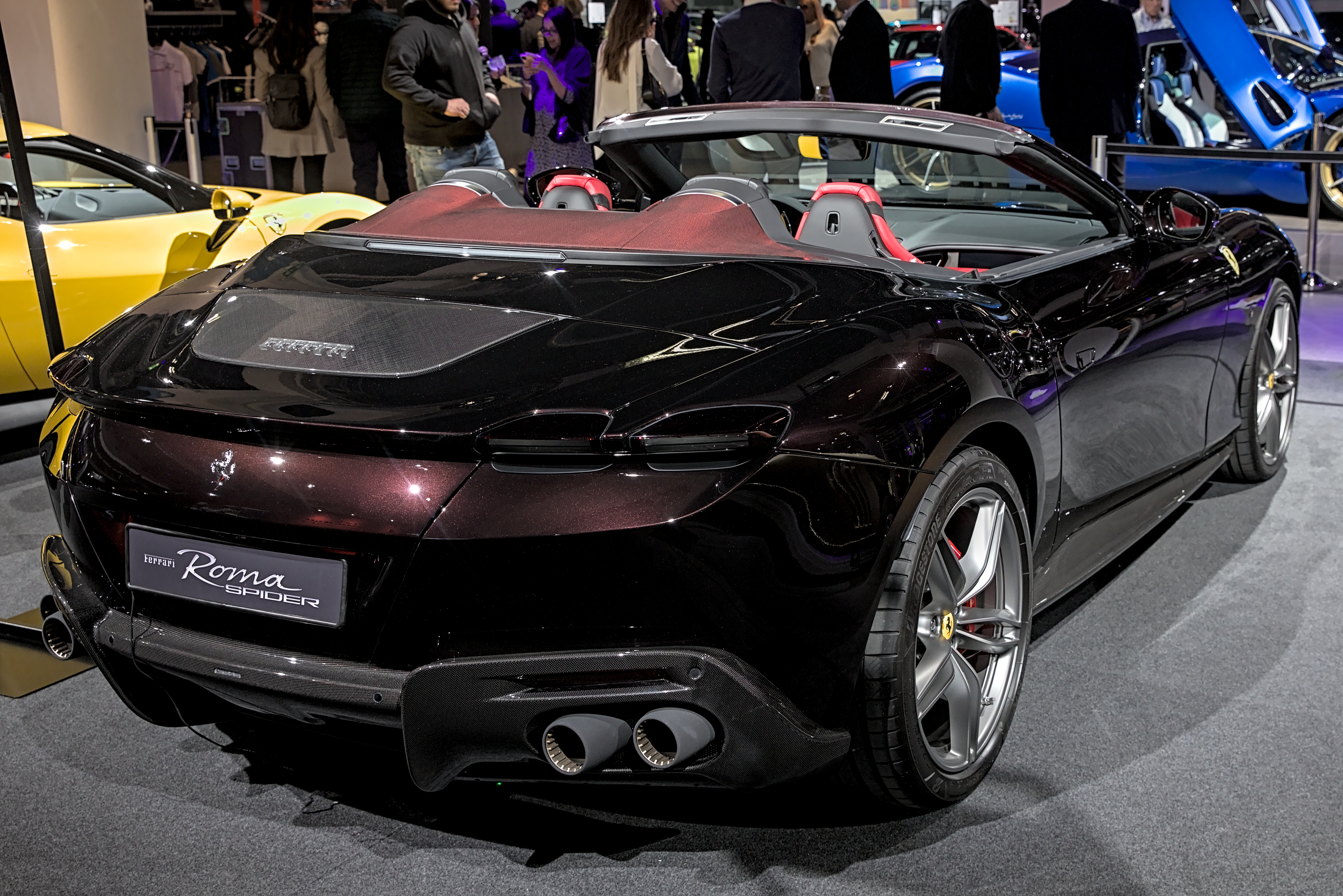
Ferrari Roma Spider rear view

In March 2023, Ferrari revealed the Roma Spider. It is meant to be the replacement for the Ferrari Portofino. Based on the successful Ferrari Roma, the new Spider variant features a soft top. This marks the return of a soft top for a front-engined Ferrari after 54 years since the 1969 365 GTS4.

=== Roma Spider Oro ===
On October 9, 2024, Ferrari unveiled a special spider, created by the Tailor Made division to show the public the new manufacturing techniques and innovative materials introduced by Ferrari, and will be exhibited to the public at the Enzo Ferrari Museum in Modena, within the Ferrari One of a Kind exhibition, where it will remain until February 2025.

== Market ==
The Roma was originally introduced with a base price of $218,670 (2020 USD). Typical final build-out configurations could range from $270k to $310k and up. Ferrari estimates 70 percent of buyers would be first-time Ferrari customers. They stated that the Roma is targeted squarely at the Porsche 911 and Aston Martin markets. The overall design theme is "understated elegance" which is somewhat of a deviation from the traditional Ferrari road car.

== Dedication and awards ==
The Roma was publicly unveiled on 14 November 2019, during an international event at Rome's Stadio dei Marmi (Stadium of the Marbles). In 2020 it made an appearance at the 150th anniversary of the declaration of Rome as the capital of a unified Italy.

The Ferrari Roma was awarded a Red Dot in 2020, recognizing the car's design. Red Dot was quoted as saying, "By renouncing all superfluous details, the design of the Ferrari Roma achieves a formal minimalism that characterizes the timeless elegance of this sports car."

Auto&Design Magazine awarded the Roma the best production car design for 2020. The panel of international auto journalists said the Roma reinterprets the classic lines of a Gran Turismo car and projects them into the 21st century with its sensual, evocative, and cutting-edge design.

The 2021 Esquire Car Awards named the Ferrari Roma as the Best Designed Car of the year.
