= Ferrari Portofino =

Ferrari Portofino Ferrari Portofino M
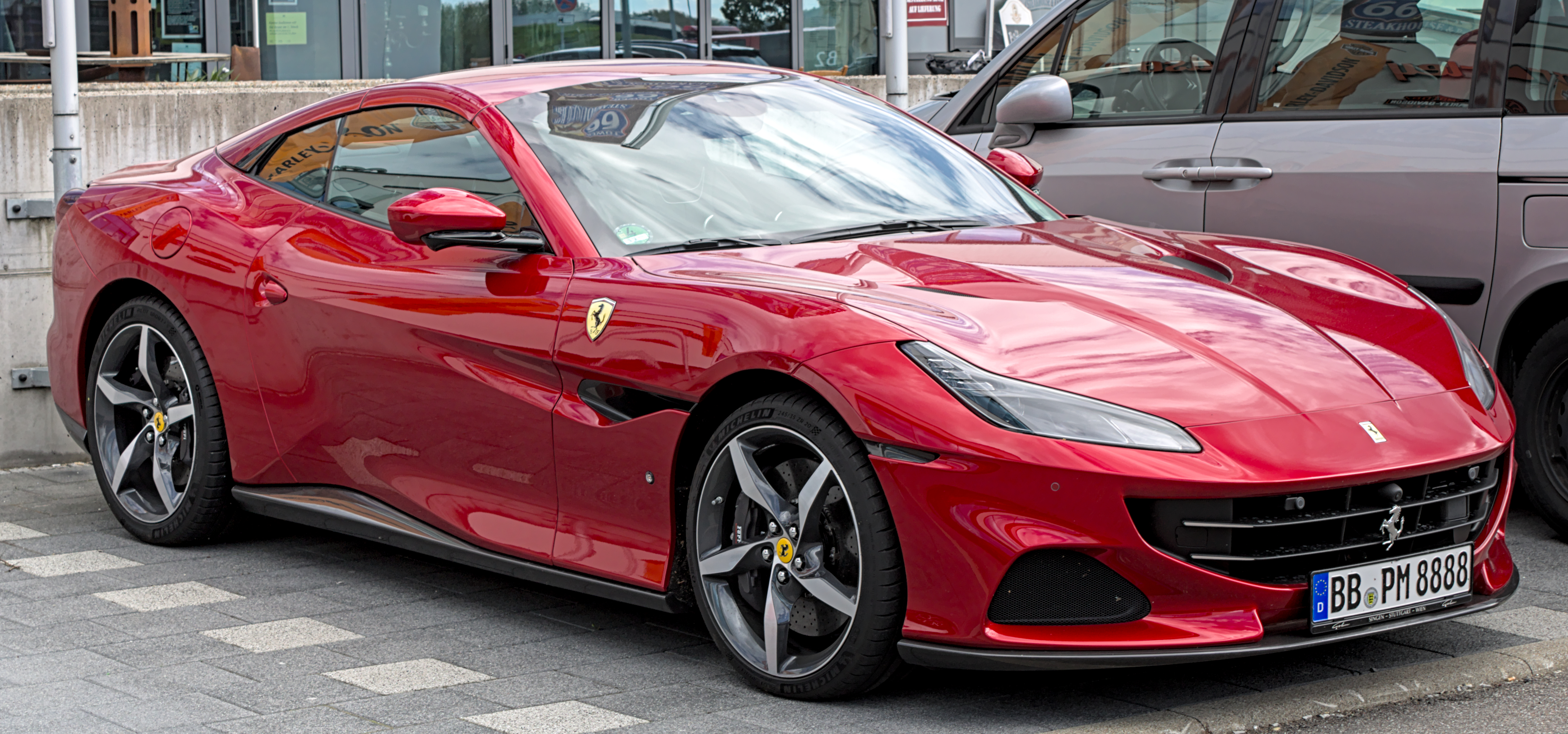
- Ferrari Portofino M

Overview
- Manufacturer: Ferrari
- Production: 2017–2023
- Assembly: Italy: Maranello
- Designer: Ferrari Styling Centre under Flavio Manzoni

Body and chassis
- Class: Grand tourer (S)
- Body style: 2-door, 2+2 retractable hardtop convertible
- Layout: Front mid-engine, rear-wheel-drive
- Related: Ferrari Roma

Powertrain
- Engine: 3.9 L F154 BE twin-turbo V8
- Power output: 441 kW; 592 hp (600 PS) (Portofino); 456 kW; 612 hp (620 PS) (Portofino M)
- Transmission: 7-speed Magna 7DCL750 dual-clutch (Portofino); 8-speed Magna 8DCL900 dual-clutch (Portofino M)

Dimensions
- Wheelbase: 2,670 mm (105.1 in)
- Length: 4,586 mm (180.6 in)
- Width: 1,938 mm (76.3 in)
- Height: 1,318 mm (51.9 in)
- Kerb weight: 1,664 kg (3,668 lb) (with fluids)

Chronology
- Predecessor: Ferrari California T
- Successor: Ferrari Roma

The Ferrari Portofino (Type F164) is a grand touring sports car produced by the Italian automotive manufacturer Ferrari. It is a two-door 2+2 hard top convertible, with a 3.9 L twin-turbo V8 gasoline engine and a 0–60 mph (0–97 km/h) time of 3.5 seconds. The car is named after the village of Portofino on the Italian Riviera and succeeds the company's previous V8 grand tourer, the California T. The car was unveiled at the 2017 Frankfurt Motor Show.

The 2020 Ferrari Roma coupe is based on the Portofino. A convertible version of the Roma was unveiled in 2023 to replace the Portofino.

== Launch ==
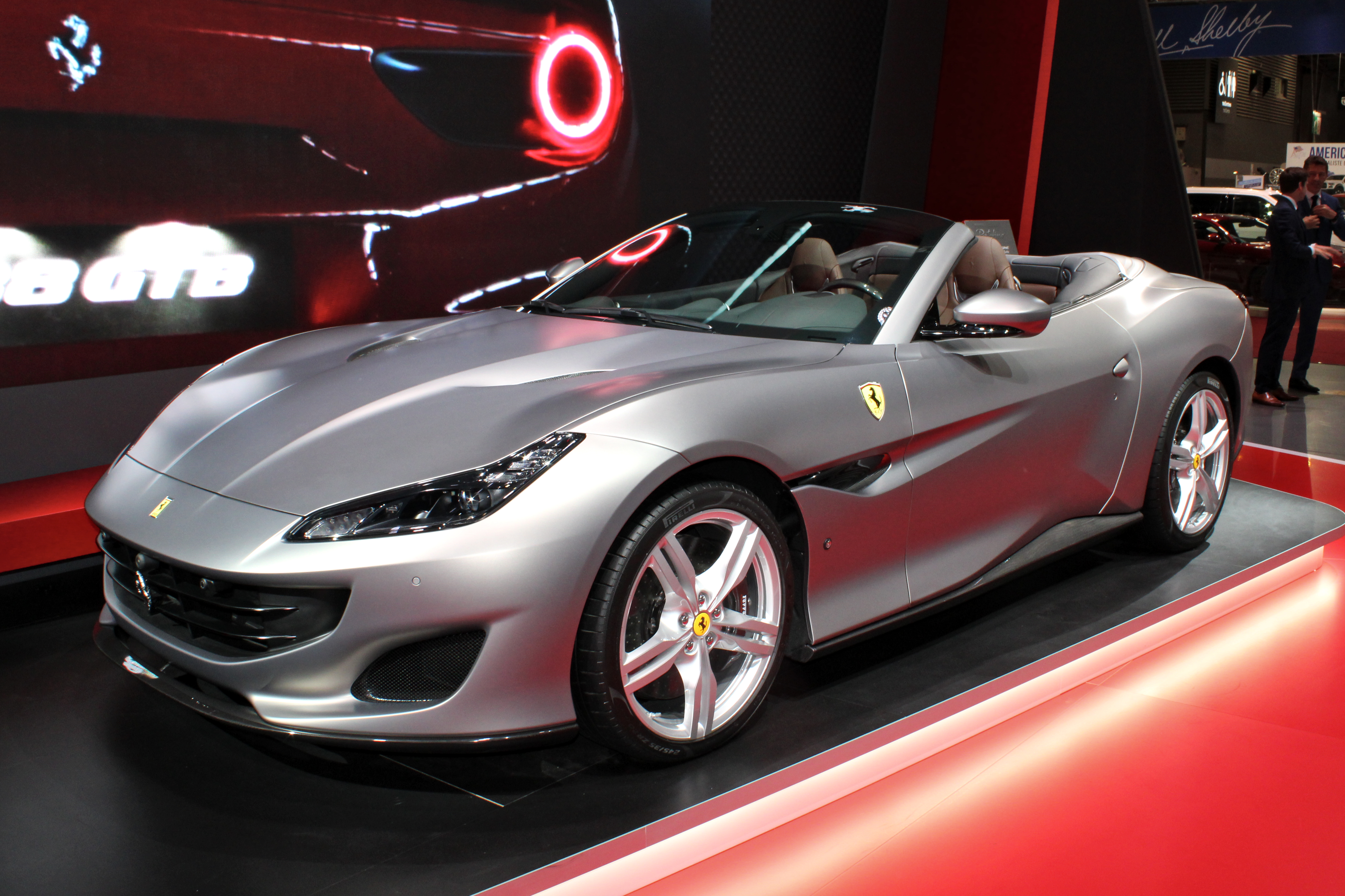
Ferrari Portofino at the 2018 Paris Motor Show

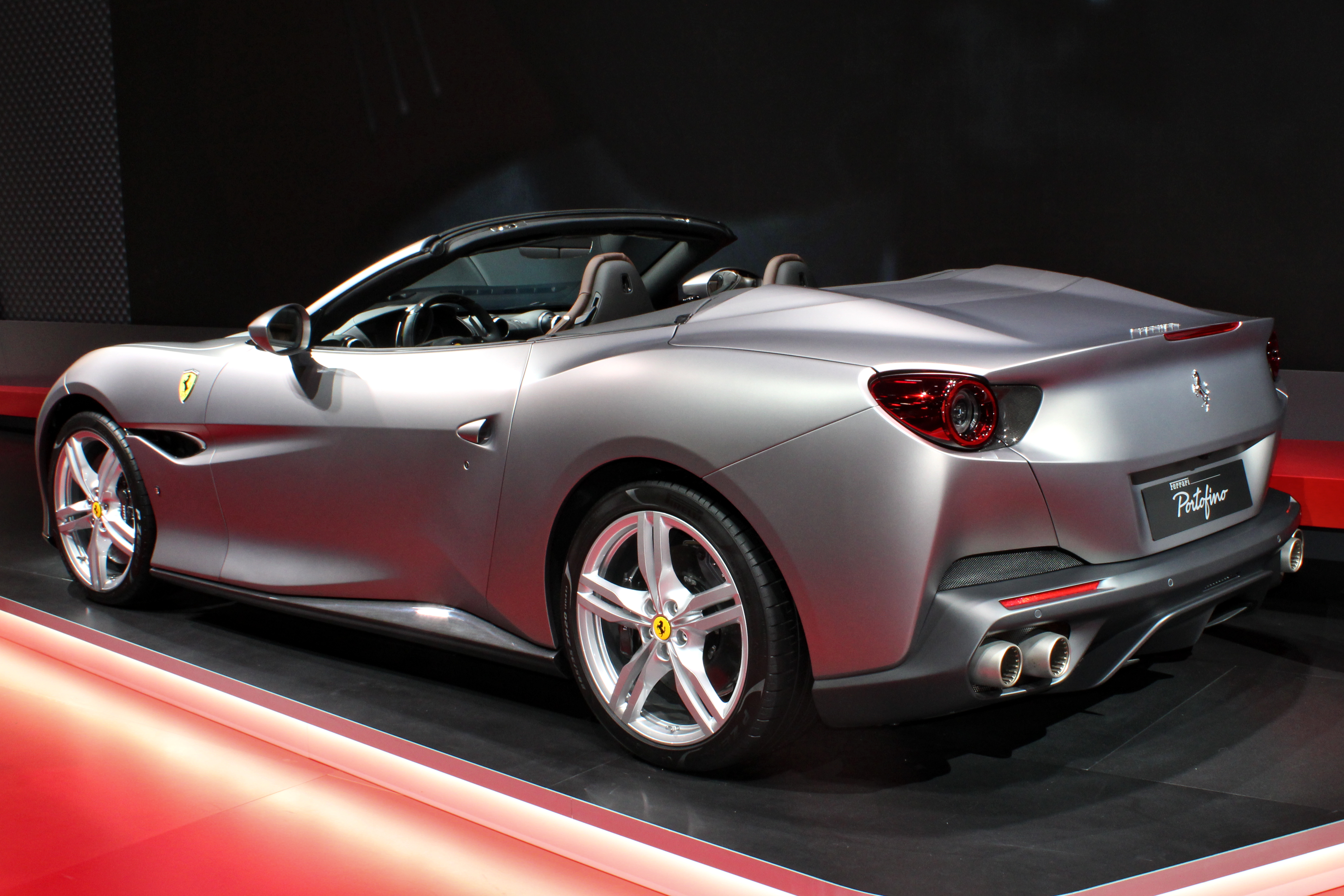
Rear view

The Ferrari Portofino was unveiled on the Italian Riviera in the village of Portofino at two exclusive evenings on 7 and 8 September 2017, at which Piero Ferrari, Sergio Marchionne, Sebastian Vettel, and Giancarlo Fisichella were present. It was also shown at Maranello on September 9 and 10 during the Ferrari 70th Anniversary celebration.

By the end of 2017, the Portofino was unveiled in Asia, namely China and Japan, where China is said to be a big market for the car. In Japan, the vehicle was initially private-previewed in November, before its official debut in February 2018. Prices in Japan start from JPY25,300,000. Prices in the U.S. start from $215,000.

In Hong Kong, the Portofino was launched in late March 2018, making it the third time in Ferrari's history to launch a new car in the Hong Kong's Peninsula Hotel (Enzo in 2003, followed by FF in 2010). Unlike previous occasions where the vehicle launch occurred in only one part of the ground floor lobby, the Portofino's launch occupied the hotel's entire ground floor area, where a few other Ferrari models were also parked outside the drop-off area, and creative lighting featuring the Ferrari's Prancing Horse logo was also projected on the hotel's exterior walls. A China-spec, left-hand drive model was displayed, which features a simplified Chinese menu display—a rare move for Ferrari as not all Chinese-speaking Asian regions would receive a Chinese language menu. Pricing for the Portofino in Hong Kong (as of April 2018) starts from HK$3.5M, with deliveries scheduled later in the year. A right-hand drive model was first spotted at the city's 488 Pista launch event in late June 2018.

== Specifications ==
=== Chassis and body ===
The chassis of the Portofino is made of 12 different aluminium alloys with much of its components now being integrated. The A-pillar of its predecessor consisted of 21 separate components but it is now a single piece in the Portofino. Hollow castings allow for increased structural rigidity, increasing it by 35% over its predecessor, the Ferrari California T.

=== Weight ===
Weight saving has been kept in focus while the development of the Portofino was carried out. Ferrari engineers managed to shave weight from the powertrain, dashboard structure, air-conditioning and heating and electronic systems of the car resulting in a weight of 1,664 kg (3,668 lb), making the car 80 kg (176 lb) lighter than its predecessor.

=== Engine, transmission and performance ===
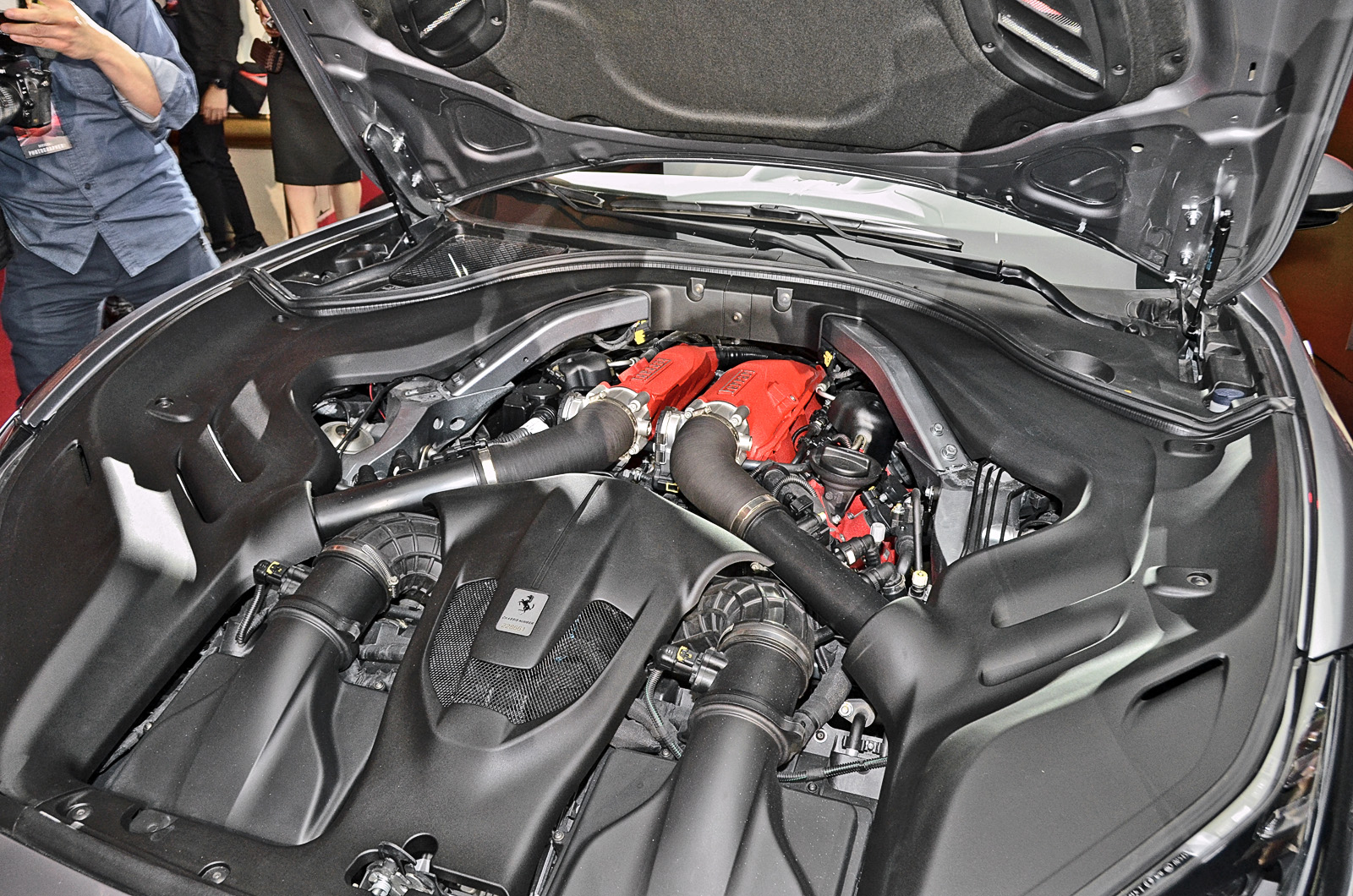
The 3.9-litre F154BD twin-turbocharged V8 engine

The engine, a 3,855 cc (235 cu in) Ferrari F154BE twin-turbocharged V8, is the same as in the Ferrari GTC4Lusso T, but yields a slightly de-tuned power output of 441 kW; 592 hp (600 PS) at 7,500 rpm and 760 N⋅m (561 ft⋅lb) of torque at 3,000 to 5,250 rpm. Changes to the engine include a 10% pressure increase in the combustion chamber, revised connecting rods and pistons and a single cast exhaust manifold. The car retains the 7-speed dual clutch transmission from its predecessor but features a new software to allow for faster gear shifts. The exhaust system has been tweaked to give the car a proper sound note while maintaining its grand touring nature, featuring an adjustable electric bypass valve that monitors the engine's sound according to driving conditions. The Portofino can accelerate from 0–100 km/h (0–62 mph) in 3.5 seconds, 0–200 km/h (0–124 mph) in 10.8 seconds and can attain a top speed of 320 km/h (199 mph).

=== Suspension and steering ===
The Portofino features optional magnetorheological dampers, a carryover from the California, with an improved software to maintain good ride quality even though having a stiffer suspension system than the California. Like the company's V12 grand tourer 812 Superfast, the Portofino features an electrically assisted power steering. Both the suspension system and steering become increasingly responsive when the car is in sports mode.

=== Interior ===
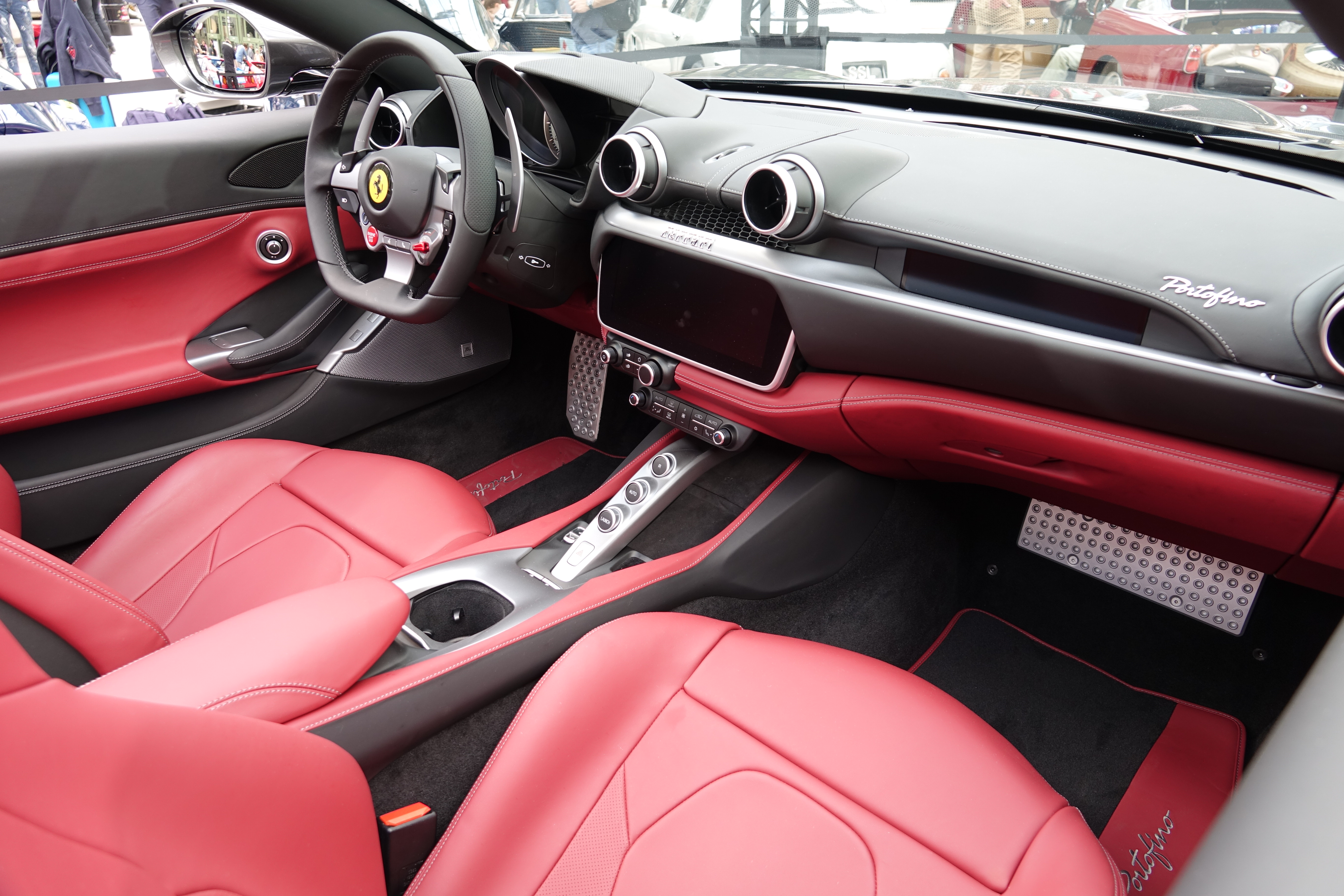
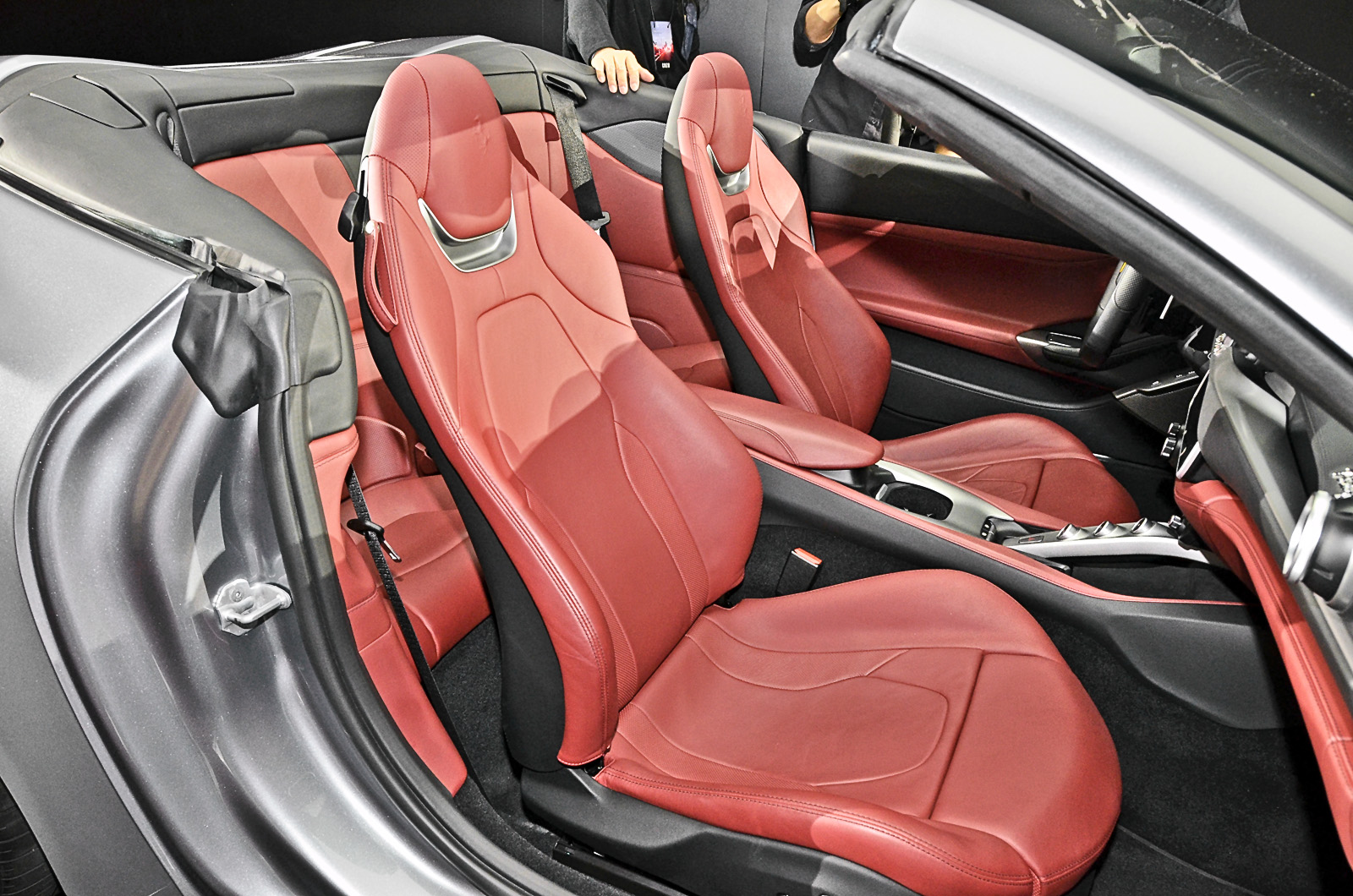
The Portofino's interior still offers very limited rear seating

The interior of the Portofino was developed after taking input from various clients. The rear seats have increased legroom (by 5 centimeters) and the infotainment system is more advanced and easier to use, featuring a 10.2-inch display screen in the centre console with optional Apple CarPlay functionality, as in its predecessor. The air conditioning system has been refined as well and is now 25% faster and 50% quieter than the California's.

== Ferrari Portofino M ==
On 16 September 2020, Car and Driver reported the launch of the Portofino M (Modificata or Modified). The power was increased to 456 kW; 612 hp (620 PS) and was released in the middle of 2021.

== Awards ==
On 9 July 2018, Ferrari received the Red Dot: Best of the Best award for the Portofino's groundbreaking design. The international judging panel stated that the Portofino “embodies an impressive evolutionary advancement" and "fascinates with an exciting design language," with the vehicle's elegance "further underscored by the uncompromising quality in material and workmanship."
