= Tatra 605 =

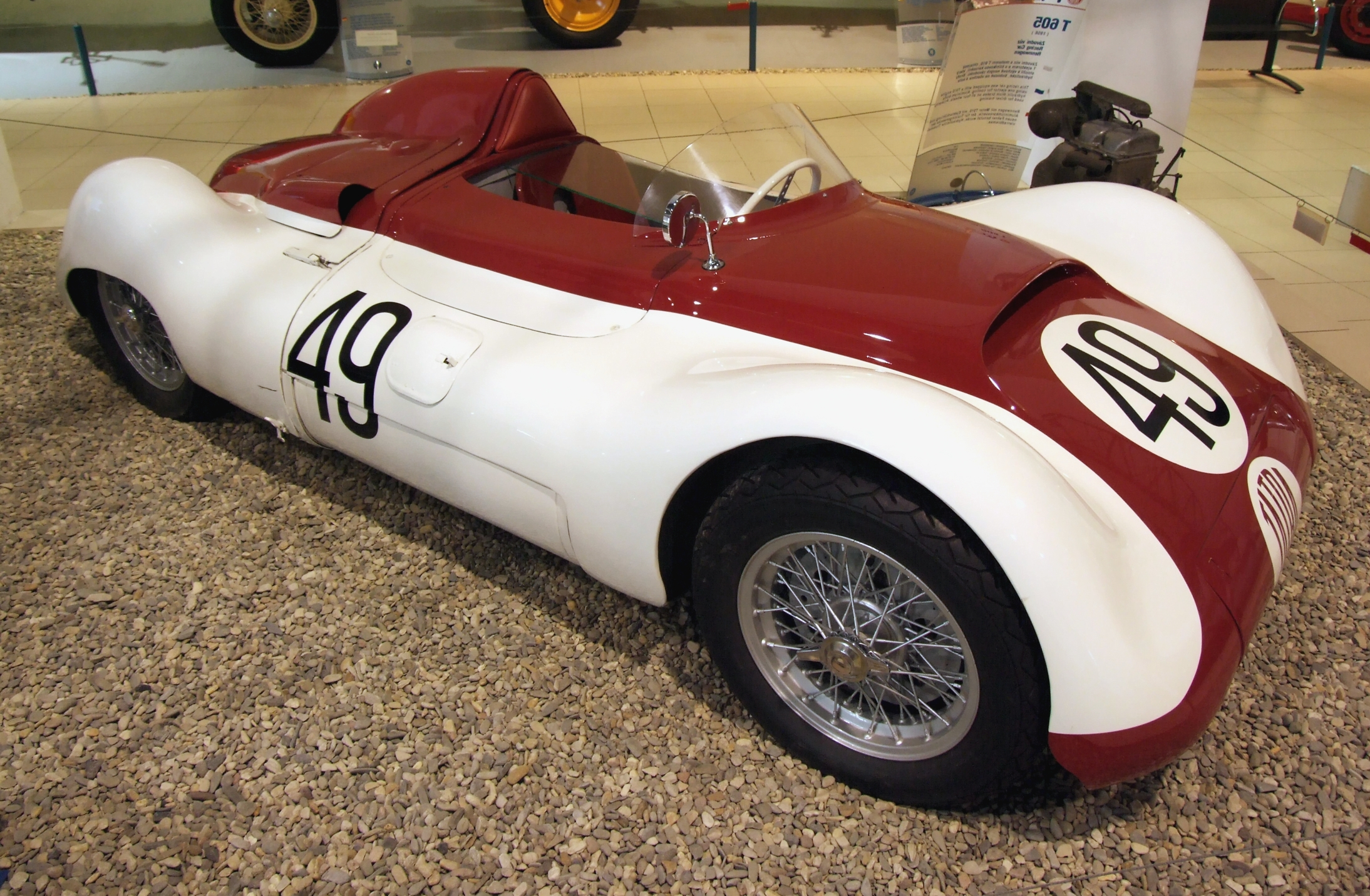

Overview
- Manufacturer: Tatra
- Production: 1957

Body and chassis
- Class: Racing car
- Layout: RR layout

Powertrain
- Engine: 637 cc Tatra 910 I2
- Transmission: 4-speed manual transaxle

Dimensions
- Wheelbase: 2,070 mm (81 in)
- Curb weight: 340 kg (750 lb)

The Tatra 605 manufactured by Tatra was a 2-seater racing car in 1957. The 340 kg (750 lb) T605 was enveloped in a 2-piece aerodynamic body. It was propelled by a 0.6-litre 2-cylinder rear-mounted engine (basically one-fourth of the Tatra 603 engine) giving 54 bhp (40 kW) and a top speed of 168 km/h (104 mph).
