= Ferrari California =

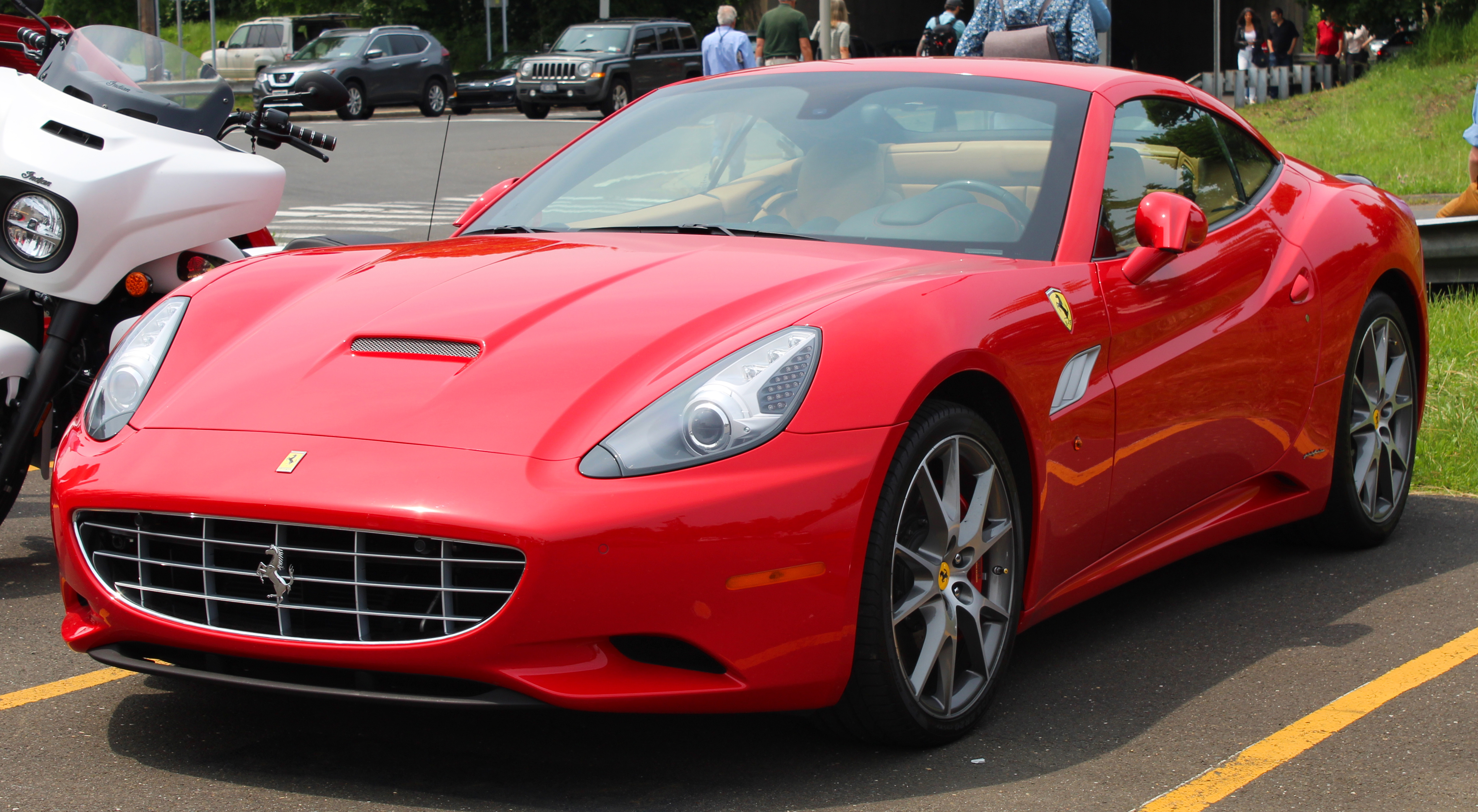

Overview
- Manufacturer: Ferrari
- Production: 2008–2017
- Assembly: Italy: Maranello

Body and chassis
- Class: Grand tourer (S)
- Body style: 2-door, 2+2 retractable hardtop convertible
- Layout: Front mid-engine, rear-wheel drive

Chronology
- Successor: Ferrari Portofino

The Ferrari California (Type F149) is a grand touring, high performance sports car created by the Italian automobile manufacturer Ferrari. It is a two-door 2+2 hard top convertible. When originally unveiled in 2008, the California was powered by a front-mid mounted, rear wheel drive, naturally aspirated 4.3-litre V8. In 2012, a lighter, slightly more powerful variant, the California 30, was introduced. In 2014, Ferrari announced the second generation of the model, named California T powered by a new twin-turbo 3.9-litre V8.

The car revives the name used on the late-1950s Ferrari 250 GT California Spyder and the 1960s 365 California. The modern California (2008) was originally introduced as an entry-level model; however, it included many new design innovations from Ferrari. The original base price of the California was similar to the base price of the F430, the company's V8 flagship sports car at the time of its introduction. In 2018, the California was succeeded by the Portofino.

== Ferrari California (2008–2014) ==
Ferrari California
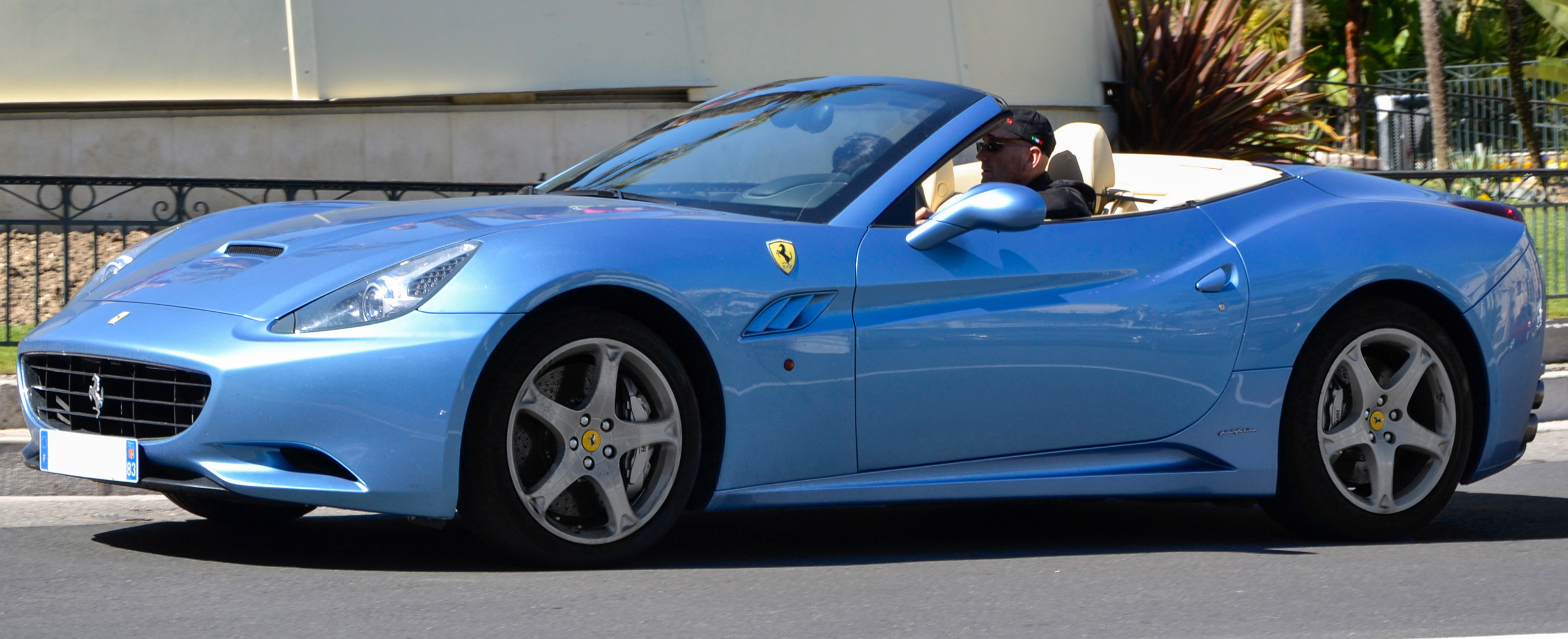

Overview
- Production: 2008–2013
- Model years: 2009–2014
- Designer: Pininfarina under Ken Okuyama (1997)

Powertrain
- Engine: 4.3 L F136 IB/IH V8
- Power output: California: 460 PS (338 kW; 454 hp); California 30: 490 PS (360 kW; 483 hp)
- Transmission: 7-speed Getrag 7DCL750 dual-clutch 6-speed manual

Dimensions
- Wheelbase: 2,670 mm (105.1 in)
- Length: 4,563 mm (179.6 in)
- Width: 1,902 mm (74.9 in)
- Height: 1,308 mm (51.5 in)
- Kerb weight: 1,735 kg (3,825 lb) (Europe); 1,870 kg (4,123 lb) (US)

2009 Ferrari California

The California was launched at the October 2008 Paris Motor Show. When introduced, the California represented a new fourth model range for Ferrari. The new model range (front-engine, eight cylinder grand touring sports car) joined the then current models: the mid-engine eight cylinder sports car, the mid-engine twelve cylinder sports car, and the front-engine twelve-cylinder grand touring car.

=== Design ===
The California represented a radical new design by Pininfarina S.p.A. and was developed under the oversight of Ken Okuyama. The model was primarily intended to attract new Ferrari owners. The car's grand touring personality was emphasized with a slightly higher ride height compared to its more aggressive siblings. The chassis was designed and manufactured by Ferrari division Carrozzeria Scaglietti. Overall, it is considered a landmark car for Ferrari in that it represents a number of concepts being used for the first time in their road cars:

- The first front engined Ferrari with a V8
- The first to feature a 7-speed dual-clutch transmission
- The first hard top convertible with a folding metal roof
- The first with multi-link rear suspension
- The first with direct petrol injection

==== Engine ====
The Ferrari-Maserati F136IB engine displaces 4,297 cubic centimetres (262.2 cubic inches), and used a gasoline direct injection system produced by Bosch. It generates a maximum power output of 338 kW (460 PS; 453 hp) at 7,750 rpm; its maximum torque produced is 485 N⋅m (358 lbf⋅ft) at 5,000 rpm. The resulting 79 kW (106 hp) per litre of engine displacement is extremely high for a naturally aspirated engine, as other manufacturers have used forced induction to reach similar power levels. The engine makes use of a wet sump designed lubrication system. The engine's sound – a feature that distinguishes every Ferrari – was engineered to enhance the vehicle's driving experience both with the top open and closed.

The California's mid-front engine layout and rear gear box configuration create a 47% front to 53% rear weight distribution.

==== Traction control ====
The California is equipped with an exclusive Ferrari designed F1-Trac system. The system, originally introduced on the 599 GTB Fiorano, was updated for the model. The variable power distribution to the rear wheels allows greater stability and performance in roadway turns. The result is an average increase of 20% in acceleration when exiting curves (when compared to traditional traction control systems).

==== Configuration ====
The grand touring California was available with two passenger seating configurations. The first option (2+2) included two rear seats that are limited in space and arguably only capable of accommodating small child safety seats. The second option (2+) did away with the rear seats, replacing them with a bench storage area, which could accommodate slightly more luggage or personal effects than the seats and included matching leather luggage tie-down belts.

==== Stop/start technology ====
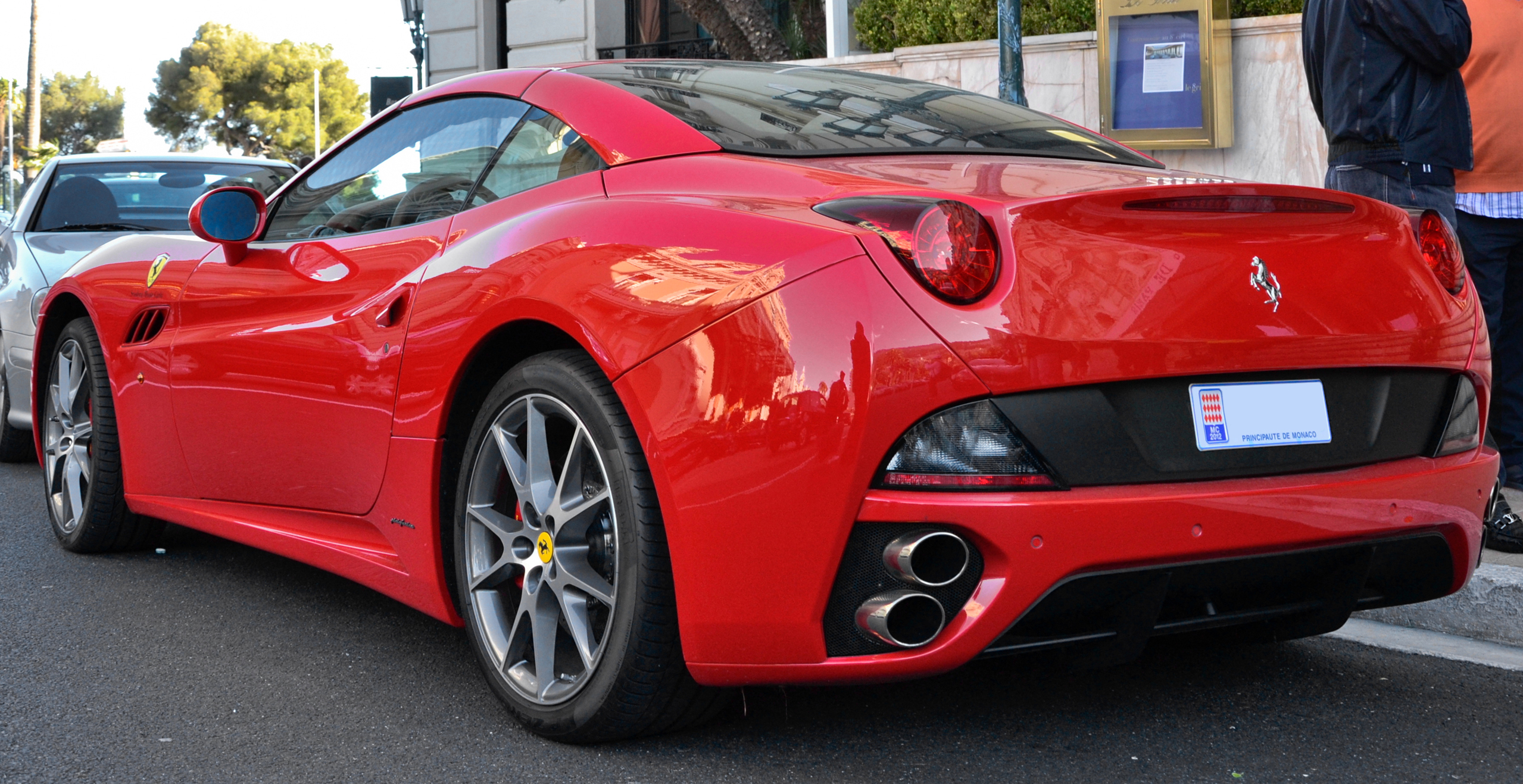
Ferrari California (Monaco)

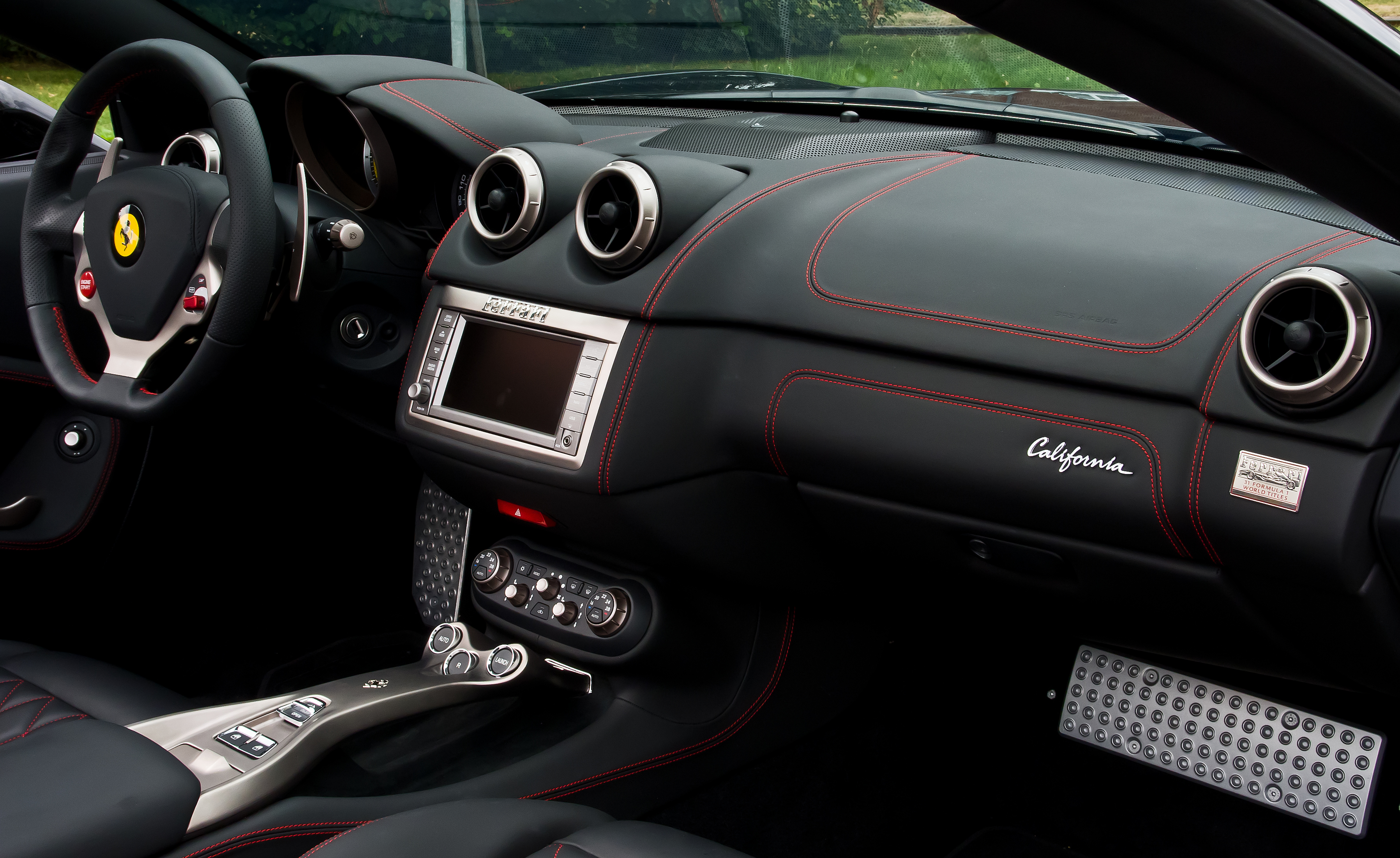
Interior

The California was the first Ferrari road car to offer stop/start technology. What was an option package and called the HELE system (High Emotion / Low Emission) allowed the engine to shut off while at extended idle and start again immediately upon pushing the accelerator pedal. While this technology was not always well received by many of the Ferrari Tifosi, it did allow for substantial tax savings upon sale in certain governmental jurisdictions. Later Ferrari models also offered this technology which has subsequently become common or mandatory in certain markets.

=== Performance ===
The original California had a top speed of 310 km/h (193 mph) and could accelerate from 0–100 km/h (0–62 mph) in four seconds. Although that model was 180 kilograms (397 lb) heavier and 22 kW (30 PS; 30 hp) less powerful than the mid-engined F430, the California reached 97 km/h (60 mph) in the same time as the F430 due to the dual-clutch transmission.

=== Aerodynamics ===
Ferrari spent over 1,000 hours in the wind tunnel with a one-third-scale model of the vehicle perfecting its aerodynamics. With the top up, the California has greatly reduced wind resistance with a drag coefficient of Cd=0.32. The California was, at the time, the most aerodynamic Ferrari road car ever made until the introduction of the F12berlinetta.

=== Production ===
The California was manufactured in a purpose built facility that was constructed adjacent to the existing factory at Maranello. The new facility was part of Ferrari's Formula Uomo programme that started in 1997 to improve production, safety and employee happiness. Overall, the Ferrari production line(s) make a total of about 27 cars per day, or between 6,000 and 8,000 cars per year.

Production of the California amounted to about 8,000 units spanning between 2008 and 2012. 1,219 cars were manufactured in calendar year 2013; 1,645 in calendar year 2014; and 2,638 in calendar year 2015. 2016 saw production of 2,247 vehicles, and about 1,600 were made in 2017. Total production of all variants was 17,349 vehicles.

Throughout the modern California's history (2008 to 2017), only 3 cars were built with manual transmission, including one order from the UK.

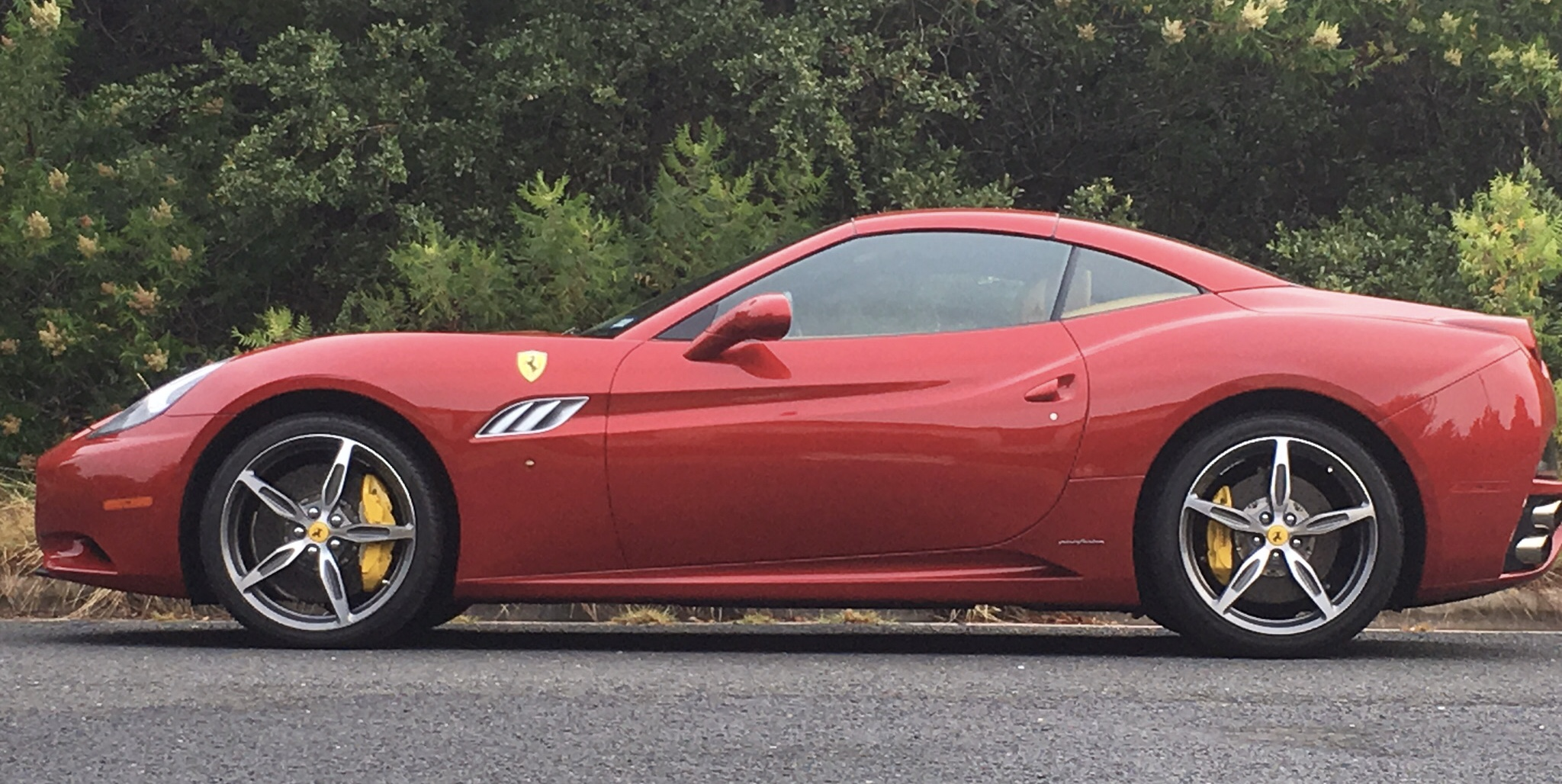
Ferrari California 30

=== California 30 - 2012 update ===
On 15 February 2012, Ferrari announced the California 30, an updated model that was lighter and more powerful. While the Pininfarina design remained, the changes included reducing body weight by 30 kg (66 lb); increased power output by 22 kW (30 PS; 30 hp) and 15 N⋅m (11 lbf⋅ft) of torque; reduced acceleration time of 3.8 seconds for 0–100 km/h (62 mph); introduction of a Handling Speciale (HS) package; a redesigned chassis and elimination of the manual transmission option. The “30” has a published top speed of 312 km/h (194 mph).

The car was unveiled at the March 2012 Geneva Motor Show as a 2012 model in Europe and as a 2013 model in North America. Deliveries began in Europe first. It was produced in North American model years 2013 and 2014 only.

==== Engine ====
Ferrari F136 IH engine

The updated engine continued with the naturally aspirated Ferrari-Maserati type F136 family. Made entirely of aluminium, the new F136IH retained many of the original features but generated a maximum power output of 360 kW (489 PS; 483 hp) at 7,750 rpm; its maximum torque produced is 505 Nm (372 ft-lbs) at 5,000 rpm, 75% of which is available at 2,250 rpm.

The California 30 can be differentiated from the base California by the VIN. In the 30 variant, the VIN's sixth digit (in North America) is “T” representing the F136IH engine. In the base model, the VIN's sixth digit (again in North America) is “L” representing the earlier generation F136IB engine.

==== Chassis ====
The California 30 chassis was re-engineered with structural modifications including new materials and aerospace derived construction technologies. It is the first Ferrari road car with a completely modular type chassis and was made entirely of innovative aluminum alloys. It is 30 kg (66 lb) lighter than the standard California chassis with no loss in structural capacity providing an extremely high torsional rigidity value.

==== Handling Speciale package ====
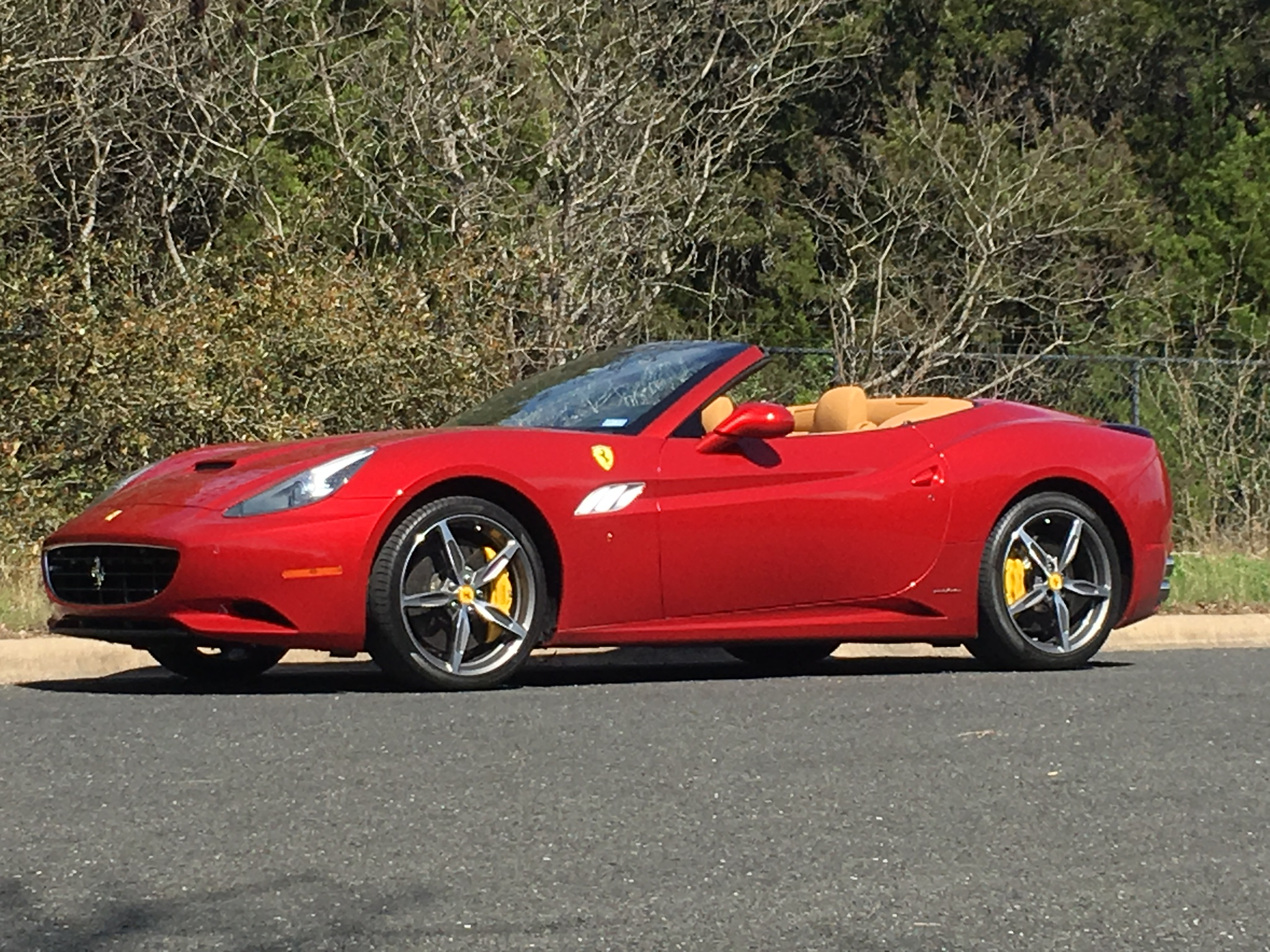
2013 California 30 HS

To give the clients a more dynamic driving experience, an optional HS (Handling Speciale) package was developed as part of the update in 2012 (for the US 2013 model year). It can typically be recognized by a no cost option of a silver coloured grille and silver ventilation blisters behind the front wheel wells.

The HS package includes Delphi MagneRide magnetorheological dampers controlled by the ECU with 50% faster response time utilizing a patented Ferrari software, stiffer springs for more precise body control and a steering rack with a 9% quicker steering ratio (2.3 turns lock to lock as opposed to the standard rack's 2.5). Overall it does away with some driving comfort trading it for reduced body roll, higher-speed cornering, and better handling during aggressive vehicle operation.

==== Customization ====
Ferrari has historically been open to working with customers to develop specific model variants or specialized features. In late 2011, this philosophy was taken up a step with the announcement of the Tailor Made programme. In the program, interested clients work with Ferrari's personal designers in Maranello to assist in decision making throughout the entire process The California 30 was one of the initial models to receive this service.

=== Recall ===
In May 2012, Ferrari recalled certain vehicles because the engine could freeze suddenly and possibly cause a crash. The F136 engines had crankshafts that were machined incorrectly. The automaker learned of the problem when it happened during a review by car critics. Owners could choose from having a new engine installed by their dealer, having the engine removed and the work done by an authorised Ferrari garage, or having a new crankshaft and bearings installed at the dealership. The recall was for a total of 200 vehicles worldwide that were produced in 2011 and 2012. Of those 200 affected vehicles, 74 were delivered to North America. The 200 recalled vehicles were from the California and 458 Italia model ranges.

== Ferrari California T (2014–2017) ==
Ferrari California T
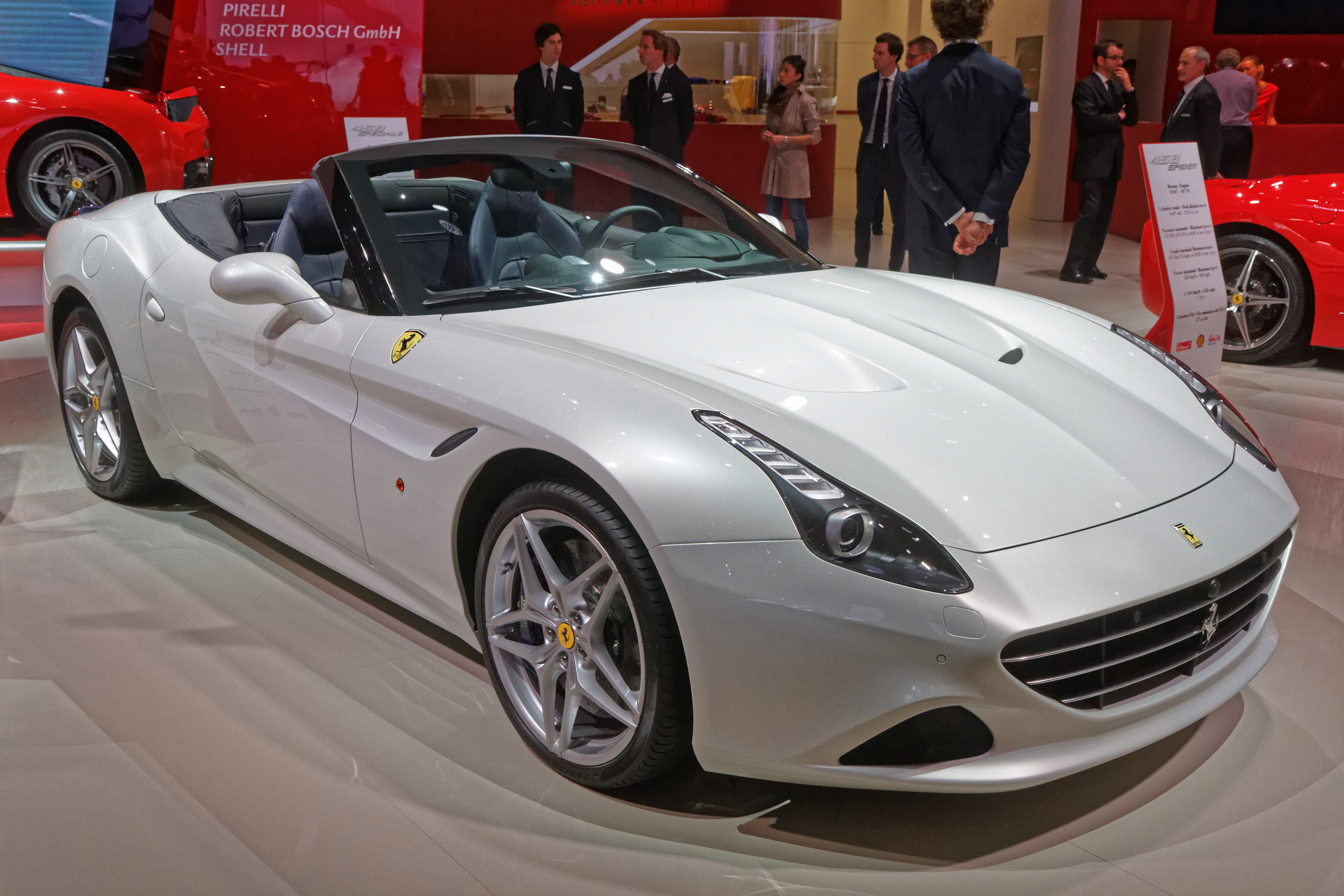

Overview
- Production: 2014–2017
- Model years: 2015–2018
- Designer: Ferrari Styling Centre under the direction of Flavio Manzoni in collaboration with Pininfarina

Powertrain
- Engine: 3.9 L F154 BB twin-turbo V8
- Power output: 412 kW (560 PS; 553 hp)
- Transmission: 7-speed Magna 7DCL750 dual-clutch

Dimensions
- Wheelbase: 2,670 mm (105.1 in)
- Length: 4,570 mm (179.9 in)
- Width: 1,910 mm (75.2 in)
- Height: 1,322 mm (52.0 in)
- Kerb weight: 1,730 kg (3,813 lb) (Europe); 1,843 kg (4,064 lb) (US)

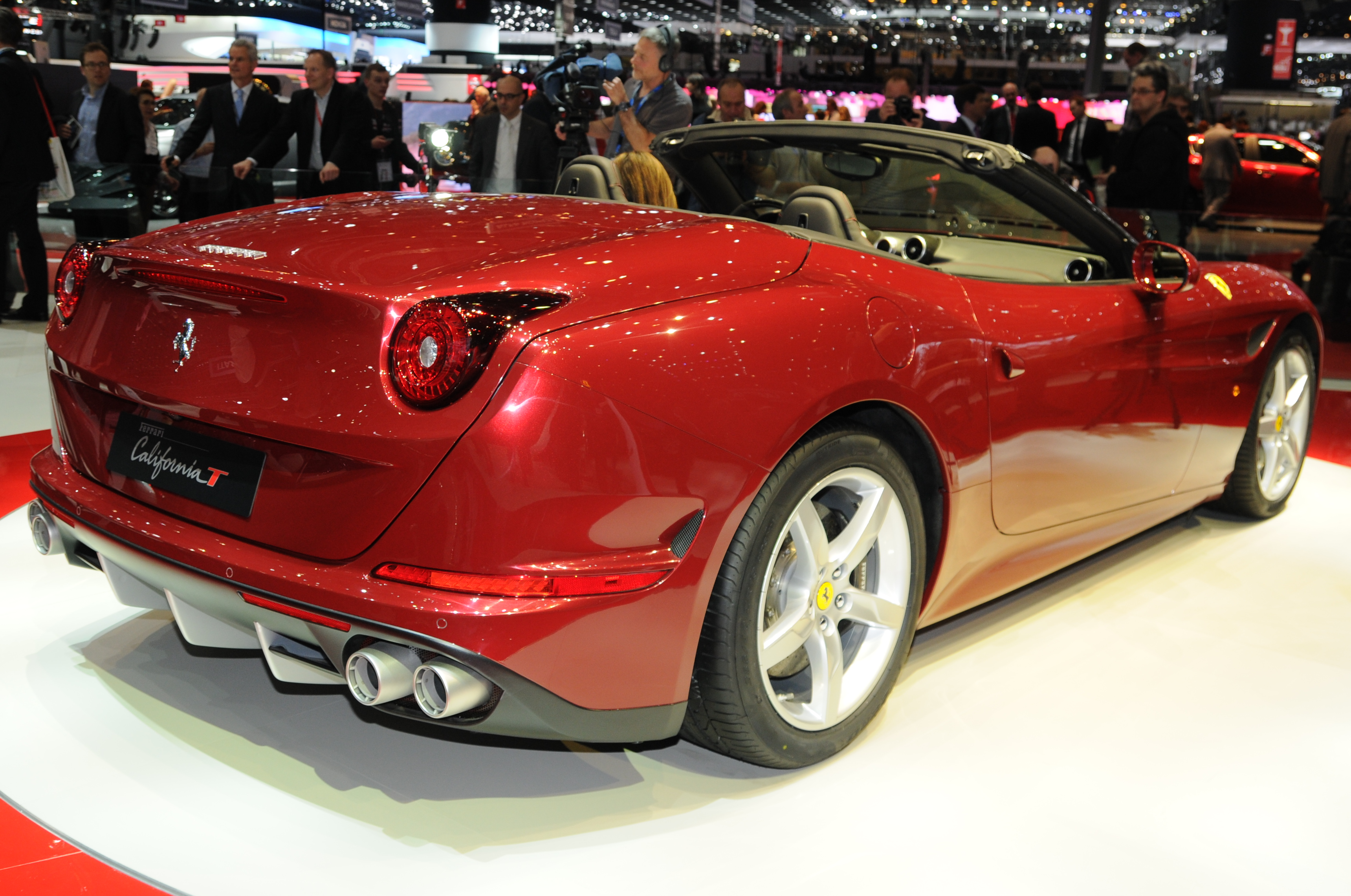
California T

The Ferrari California T (Type F149M) is an updated design of the California model featuring new sheetmetal and revised body features; a new interior, a revised chassis and a new turbocharged powertrain. It debuted in 2014 for the 2015 model year.

First unveiled on the web on February 12, 2014, subsequently, the car debuted at the Geneva Motor Show (March 6–16, 2014). The T in the moniker stands for Turbo, a technology Ferrari last used on the F40 road car. The car utilizes a new 3,855 cc (3.9 L; 235.2 cu in) twin-turbocharged V8 engine that produces 412 kW (560 PS; 553 hp) at 7,500 rpm and 755 N⋅m (557 lb⋅ft) at 4,750 rpm as well as a 7-speed dual clutch transmission with different gear ratios, a revised MagneRide adaptive suspension, as well as a new F1 Trac system. The car can accelerate from 0–100 km/h (0–62 mph) in 3.6 seconds and reach a top speed of 315 km/h (196 mph). The car also features a new front fascia that was influenced by the F12, a revised rear section and a revised interior. The revised rear end replaced the two sets of two vertically stacked exhaust pipes with four horizontally aligned pipes. Another improvement to the car is the reduction of emission pollution by 15% compared to its naturally aspirated predecessor. The car also utilises small turbo chargers and a variable boost management system to reduce turbo lag.

It is also the first Ferrari road car debuting the new Apple CarPlay functionality into its built-in infotainment system – Apple confirmed at the launch of the Geneva Motor Show that Ferrari, Mercedes-Benz and Volvo would be among the first car manufacturers to bring CarPlay compatible models to the market.

=== California T Handling Speciale (2016–2017) ===
Similarly to the previous generation, a Handling Speciale (HS) package was made available for the California T, providing sportier handling at the expense of a stiffer ride. The Handling Speciale includes stiffer springs front and aft, retuned magnetorheological dampers, faster gear shifts when in Sport mode, a reprogrammed F1-Trac stability control, and a new sport exhaust system. Visually, the HS package-equipped cars are distinguished by a matte grey grille and rear diffuser, matte black diffuser fences and matte black exhaust tips.

The California T Handling Speciale was unveiled at the March 2016 Geneva Motor Show.

=== Tailor Made ===
Through the Tailor Made programme, the California T was produced in several special editions and could also be customised to suit individual customers. For Ferrari's 70th anniversary in 2017, this included 70 liveries inspired by the company's iconic cars of the past such as the 250 GT Berlinetta SWB and Steve McQueen's 1963 250 GT Berlinetta Lusso. The California T Tailor Made liveries were unveiled at the March 2016 Geneva Motor Show and also shown at other subsequent motor shows such as the October 2016 Paris Motor Show.
