= Kinzie Hotel =

Hotel in Chicago, Illinois

The Kinzie Hotel (formerly the Amalfi Hotel Chicago) is a 215-room hotel, located near the corner of State Street and Kinzie Street, in the River North District, in downtown Chicago, Illinois, US, within walking distance of the Chicago Loop.

== History ==
Kinzie Hotel, which occupies the first six floors of the 17-story Dearborn Plaza, 20 W. Kinzie Street, opened to the public as Amalfi Hotel Chicago on February 3, 2004. Kinzie Street Hotel Investors LLC, a group that included representatives of the Cataldo family, Jupiter Realty Corp and the Joel Stone Family of Stone-Levy LLC, invested $6 million to remake the property, which had previously been the 10 West Hotel. Hostmark Hospitality was selected as the management company for the hotel.

The Amalfi was designed by Robert J. Cataldo, Hostmark Hospitality Group's president and Chief Operating Officer.

In June 2007, Kinzie Street Hotel Investor group sold the property to Cornerstone Real Estate Advisors LLC, the current owner of the hotel. Cornerstone was retained by Hostmark Hospitality Group as the management company for the Amalfi.

In February 2014 following a multimillion-dollar renovation, Amalfi Hotel Chicago was rebranded as Kinzie Hotel. Managed by Portfolio Hotels & Resorts, it was designed by Gettys Design Group, Chicago, and pays tribute to John Kinzie, prominently recognized as Chicago's first civilian. The hotel has 210 guest rooms and 5 suites.
