= 2+2 (car body style) =

Car configuration with two rear seats rather than three, for a total of four seats

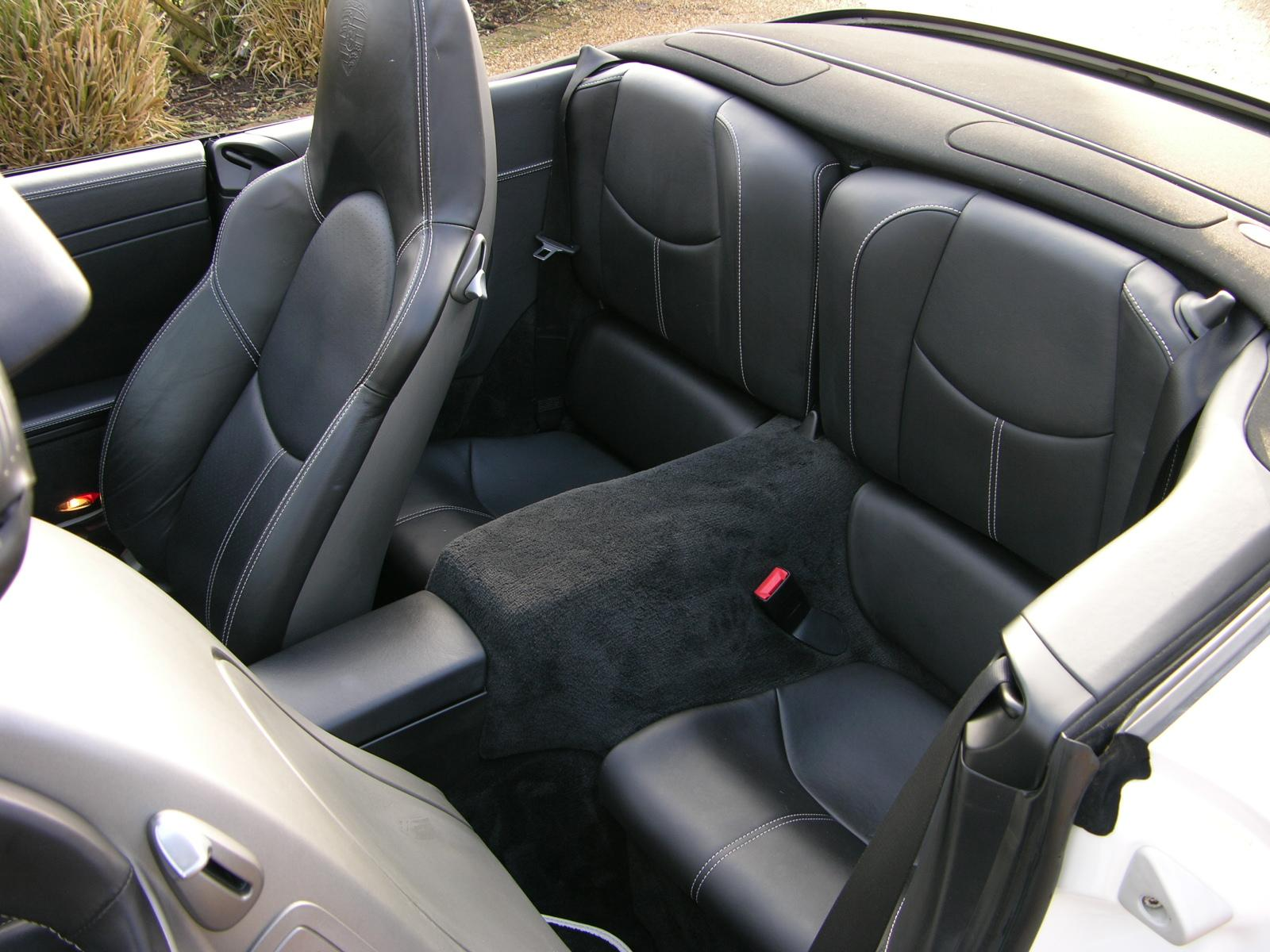
Rear seat of a Porsche 911, typical of "auxiliary" seating in many of the smaller or most sporty 2+2s

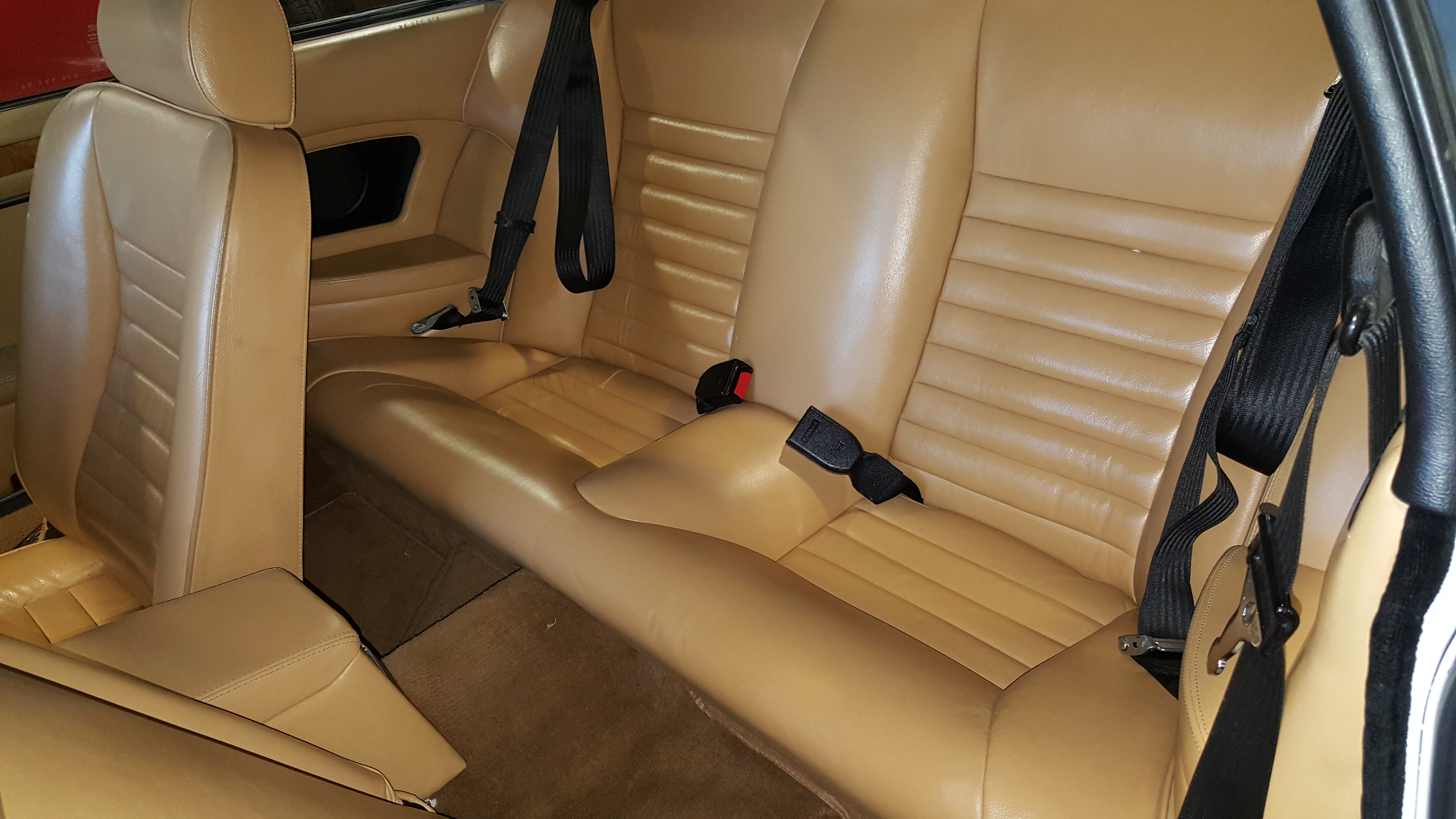
Rear seats of a 1982 Jaguar XJS HE coupé, spacious for a 2+2

A 2+2 (also 2-plus-2) is a car-body style that has a seat each for the driver and front passenger, and two rear seats. The latter may be individual "bucket" seats, fold-downs, or a full-width "bucketed" bench seat, but always with less leg room than the front seats. The style is different from four- or five-seat automobiles having normal-size rear seats, with second-row 2+2 seating typically only suitable for children or occasional use.

== Definition ==
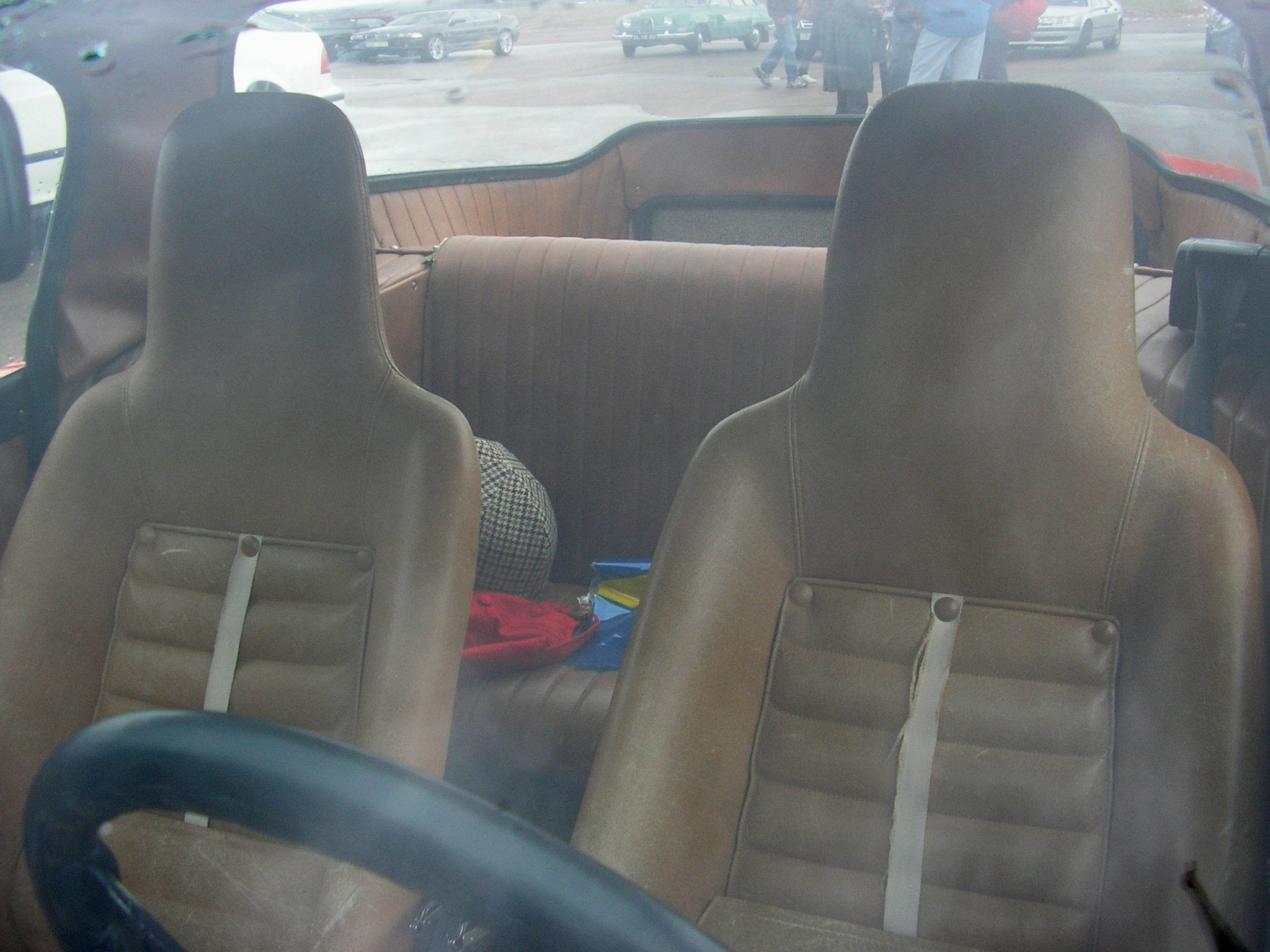
A rear bench seat is an unusual configuration for a 2+2, here in a SAAB Sonett Mark II.

By standard definition, all cars in the 2+2 category have two front seats and two rear seats. Other common characteristics for 2+2 cars include relatively little room for the rear passengers and a "streamlined" body with two doors. While 2+2 seating is most commonly associated with coupés, especially those which strongly favour front passenger seating such as sports cars and grand tourers, certain convertibles with "auxiliary"-type rear seats may also be regarded as 2+2s.

Some vehicles (such as the TVR Cerbera and Toyota iQ) have been marketed as "3+1" due to their front passenger seat having more space for forward adjustment than the driver's, allowing for more leg room for one rear-seat passenger.

== Usage ==
There are many coupés which meet the definition of a 2+2 but are not described by their manufacturers as such. This is because the term 2+2 is most often used to distinguish cars with what typically amounts to auxiliary rear seating, at times enlarged from a two-seat version of the same model to accommodate it, such as the Jaguar E-type fixed-head coupé 2+2, whose wheelbase was lengthened from 96 to 105 inches (244 to 267 cm) for its 1966 introduction. Other similar examples of stretched two-seaters include the Lotus Elan +2, the Datsun 260Z 2+2 and the Ferrari 365 GT 2+2.

=== Cars marketed as 2+2 ===
- Toyota 86 / Subaru BRZ
- Honda CR-Z
- Porsche 911
- Ferrari 365 GT 2+2
- Ferrari 365 GT4 2+2
- Ford Mustang 2+2 fastback (introduced 1964)
- Ferrari California

== See also ==
- Car classification
- Targa top
