= Magna Powertrain =

Automotive company

Magna Powertrain Inc.
- Formerly: Magna Drivetrain
- Type: Division
- Industry: Automotive
- Predecessor: Tesma International; Magna Steyr Powertrain; New Venture Gear; Getrag
- Founded: April 18, 2004; 22 years ago
- Headquarters: Troy, Michigan
- Area served: Worldwide
- Products: Transmission systems; Driveline systems
- Services: Metal-forming; Engineering services
- Parent: Magna International
- Website: Magna Powertrain

Magna Powertrain is a major American-based manufacturer of transmission and drivetrain systems. It is a division of the larger Canadian company Magna International. It was formed from multiple subsidiaries and acquisitions. In addition to producing transmission systems and drivetrain systems, they also provide metal-forming and engineering services.

== History ==
In 1988, Magna formed Tesma International to manufacture engine and transmission parts. Tesma was spun off into a public company in 1995 while retaining affiliation with Magna.

In 2001, founded Magna Steyr (through an acquisition), to engineer, develop and assemble automobiles for other companies on a contractual basis. In April 2004, Magna transferred the powertrain operations of Magna Steyr to a new subsidiary called Magna Drivetrain, to focus on engineering and assembly of chassis, driveline subsystems, and modules. Magna stated the new company would better address the growing importance of all-wheel drive powertrains. In September 2004, Magna acquired the global operations of New Venture Gear from DaimlerChrysler for an estimated price of $435 million, and integrated it with Magna Drivetrain. The acquisition helped establish the newly formed Magna Drivetrain group as a major supplier of four-wheel and all-wheel drive systems manufactured in Europe and North America.

Tesma was privatized again by Magna in December 2004. In 2005, Magna merged Magna Drivetrain with Tesma to form Magna Powertrain. In July 2015 Magna Powertrain acquired Getrag, a major transmission manufacturer, for $1.9 billion. The acquisition gave Magna Powertrain access to Getrag's transmission systems, including recent hybrid designs.

== Customers ==
Major customers include:

- General Motors (GMC, Buick, Cadillac, Chevrolet)
- Mercedes-Benz Group (Mercedes-Benz)
- Tata (Jaguar)
- BMW (BMW, MINI)
- Ferrari
- Stellantis North America (Jeep, Chrysler, Dodge, Ram)
- Stellantis Europe (Fiat, Alfa-Romeo)
- Ford (Ford, Lincoln).

== Products ==
Magna Powertrain is divided into two manufacturing group, their transmission systems and their driveline systems groups. The transmission systems group was formed in 2016 from the acquisition of Getrag. The group produces manual, dual-clutch, and hybrid transmissions formerly produced by Getrag. The driveline systems group produces four-wheel drive and all-wheel drive driveline systems. They produce transverse and longitudinal drivetrain layouts for a variety of vehicle types. The company also has a metal-forming group and an engineering services group.

== Locations ==
=== Manufacturing plants ===
Magna Powertrain has manufacturing plants in Canada, Mexico, the United States, Austria, France, Germany, Italy, Slovakia, China, India, and South Korea.

==== Canada ====
- Aurora, Ontario
- Mississauga, Ontario
- Markham, Ontario
- Vaughan, Ontario

==== Mexico ====
- Irapuato, Guanajuato
- Ramos Arizpe, Coahuila

==== United States ====
- Lansing, Michigan
- Muncie, Indiana
- Sterling Heights, Michigan

==== Austria ====
- Albersdorf
- Ilz (Styria)
- Lannach
- St. Valentin
- Traiskirchen

==== France ====
- Bordeaux

==== Germany ====
- Bad Windsheim
- Neuenstein
- Roitzsch
- Rosenberg

==== Italy ====
- Modugno

==== Slovakia ====
- Kechnec

==== China ====
- Changzhou, Jiangsu
- Ganzhou, Jiangxi
- Nanchang, Jiangxi
- Tianjin

==== India ====
- Sanand, Gujarat

==== South Korea ====
- Asan

=== Offices ===
Magna Powertrain also has offices not located within a manufacturing plant in France, Germany, China, India, Japan, South Korea.

==== France ====
- Paris

==== Germany ====
- Cologne
- Munich
- St. Georgen
- Untergruppenbach

==== China ====
- Shanghai

==== India ====
- Pune, India
- Bengaluru, India

==== Japan ====
- Tokyo

==== South Korea ====
- Seoul

== Joint ventures ==
In November 2006, Magna Powertrain and Amtek Auto Ltd. signed a 50-50 joint venture to establish a manufacturing facility outside of New Delhi, for two-piece flexplate assemblies for automotive applications. In October 2007, Magna Powertrain and RICO Auto Industries Ltd, a full-service Indian-based powertrain components and assemblies supplier, signed a 50-50 joint venture to establish a new manufacturing facility located in Gurgaon. The facility produces oil and water pumps with aluminum housings for automotive engine applications for Indian and European markets.

In January 2009, WIA Corporation and Magna Powertrain formed a 50-50 joint ventures to establish a new manufacturing facility located in Asan, Korea. The facility produces and supplies all-wheel-drive couplings for Hyundai Motor Group.

In July 2021, LG and Magna Powertrain formed a LG majority (51%-49%) joint venture to establish LG Magna e-Powertrain in Incheon, South Korea. The goal of the joint venture is to manufacture electric motors, inverters, on-board chargers and other "e-drive systems."
