= Alfa Romeo 33 (disambiguation) =

Alfa Romeo 33 is a small family car produced between 1985 and 1995.

Alfa Romeo 33 may also refer to:

- Alfa Romeo Tipo 33, several sports car racing prototypes raced from 1967 to 1977
- Alfa Romeo 33 Stradale, a rare road going sports car, 18 built from 1967 to 1969
- Alfa Romeo 33 Stradale (2023), small homage series of 33 sports cars produced in 2023
