= Stradale =

Stradale (Italian for "road-going") may refer to:

- Alfa Romeo 33 Stradale, street-legal derivative of a racecar
- Alfa Romeo 33 Stradale (2023), the spiritual successor to the original Alfa Romeo 33 Stradale
- Dallara Stradale, first streetcar from racecar maker Dallara
- Ferrari 360 Challenge Stradale
- Ferrari SF90 Stradale
- Maserati GranTurismo MC Stradale
- Lancia 037 Stradale
