= Alfa Romeo Stelvio =

Luxury crossover SUV

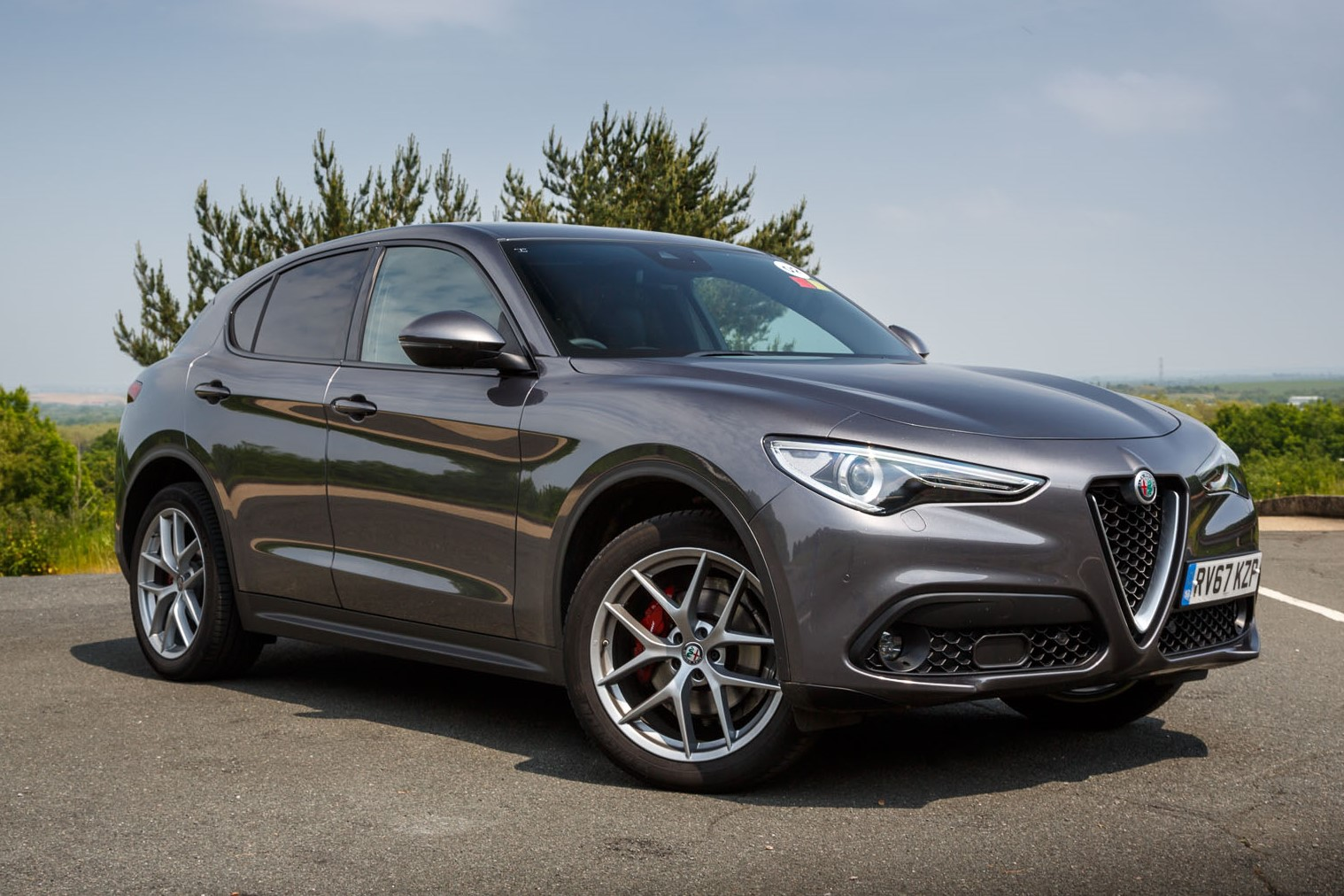

Overview
- Manufacturer: Alfa Romeo
- Model code: 949
- Production: 2016–present
- Model years: 2017–present
- Assembly: Italy: Piedimonte San Germano, Lazio (Cassino Plant)
- Designer: Carmelo Giannone (Senior Exterior Designer), Centro Stile Alfa Romeo

Body and chassis
- Class: luxury crossover SUV (D-segment)
- Body style: 5-door SUV
- Layout: Front-engine, all-wheel-drive/rear-wheel-drive (2.0 Turbo Petrol)
- Platform: FCA Giorgio
- Related: Alfa Romeo Giulia (2015); Jeep Grand Cherokee

Powertrain
- Engine: 2.0 L TBI-M T4 Multiair turbo I4 petrol; 2.9 L 690T twin turbo V6 petrol; 2.2 L JTDm Multijet II TD I4 diesel
- Transmission: 8-speed automatic (ZF 8HP50); 8-speed automatic (ZF 8HP75, Quadrifoglio)

Dimensions
- Wheelbase: 2,818 mm (110.9 in)
- Length: 4,687 mm (184.5 in)
- Width: 1,903 mm (74.9 in) excl mirrors
- Height: 1,648 mm (64.9 in)
- Kerb weight: 1,831 kg (4,037 lb) 2.0 AWD; 1,955 kg (4,309 lb) Quadrifoglio

The Alfa Romeo Stelvio (Type 949) is a luxury crossover SUV produced by the Italian manufacturer Alfa Romeo since 2016. (Note: Alfa Romeo is a subdivision of Stellantis (formerly FCA).) As a D-segment model it slots above the smaller Tonale model in the marque's SUV range. It was first revealed at the 2016 Los Angeles Auto Show and entered production at the Cassino Plant at the end of 2016. In 2018 it was Alfa Romeo's best-selling model, with roughly 43,000 sold that year. In 2024, it had fallen behind the Tonale in the U.S. as sales dropped to just 3,162 from 12,043 in 2018.

The Stelvio uses FCA's Giorgio platform, shared with the D-segment Giulia saloon. The name Stelvio derives from the Stelvio Pass, Italy's highest mountain pass, noted for its 48 circuitous switchbacks.

== Characteristics ==
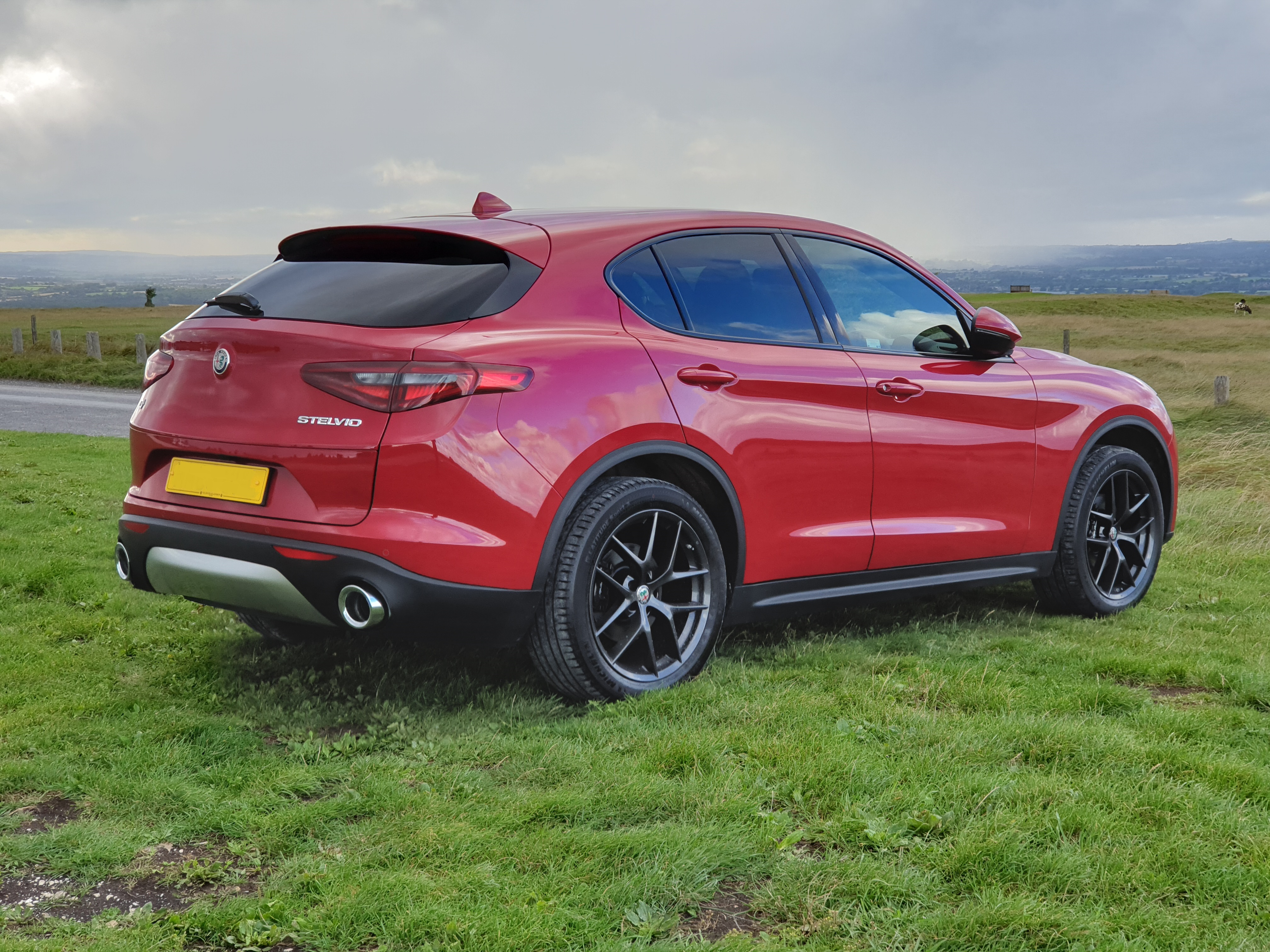
Rear

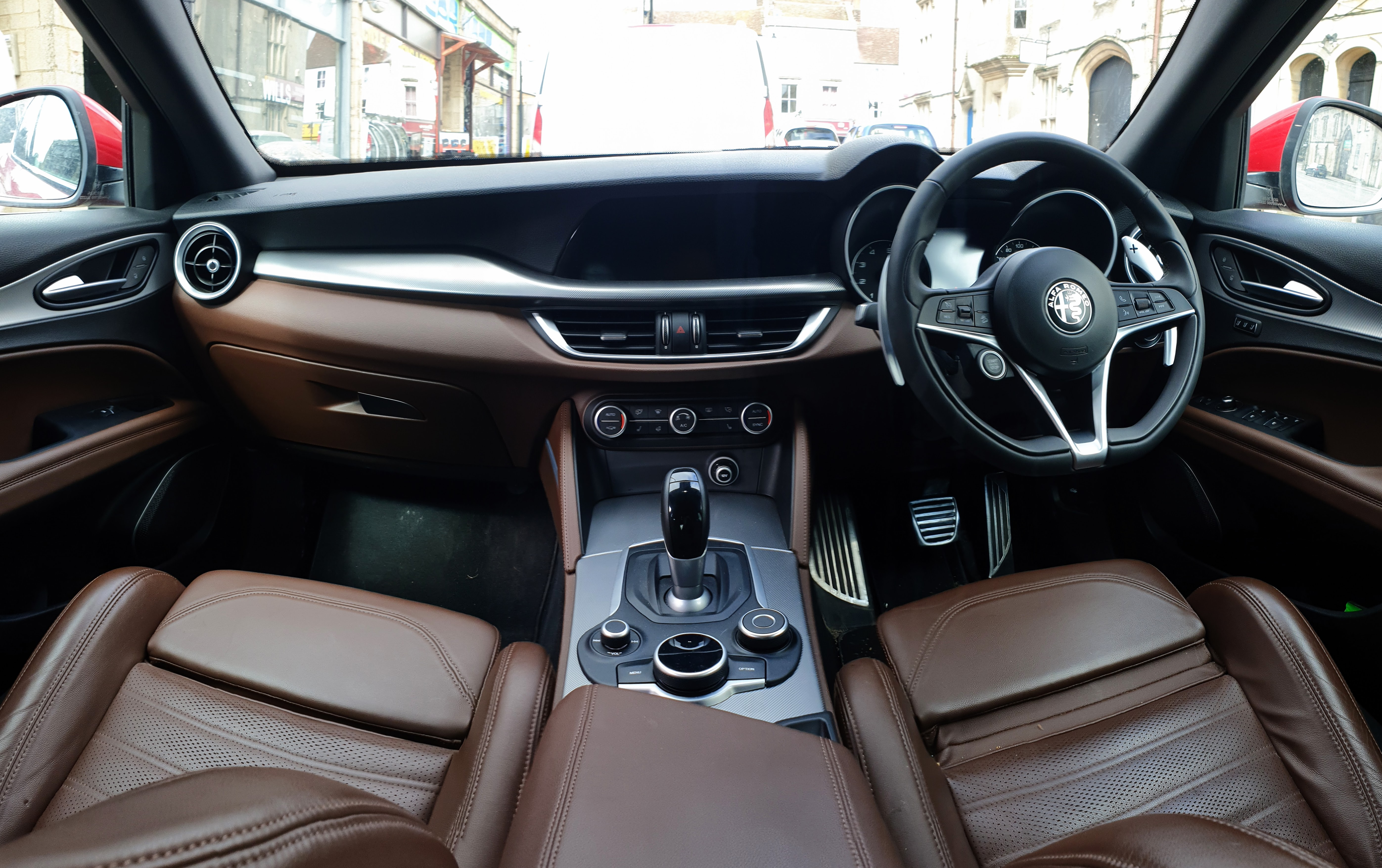
Interior

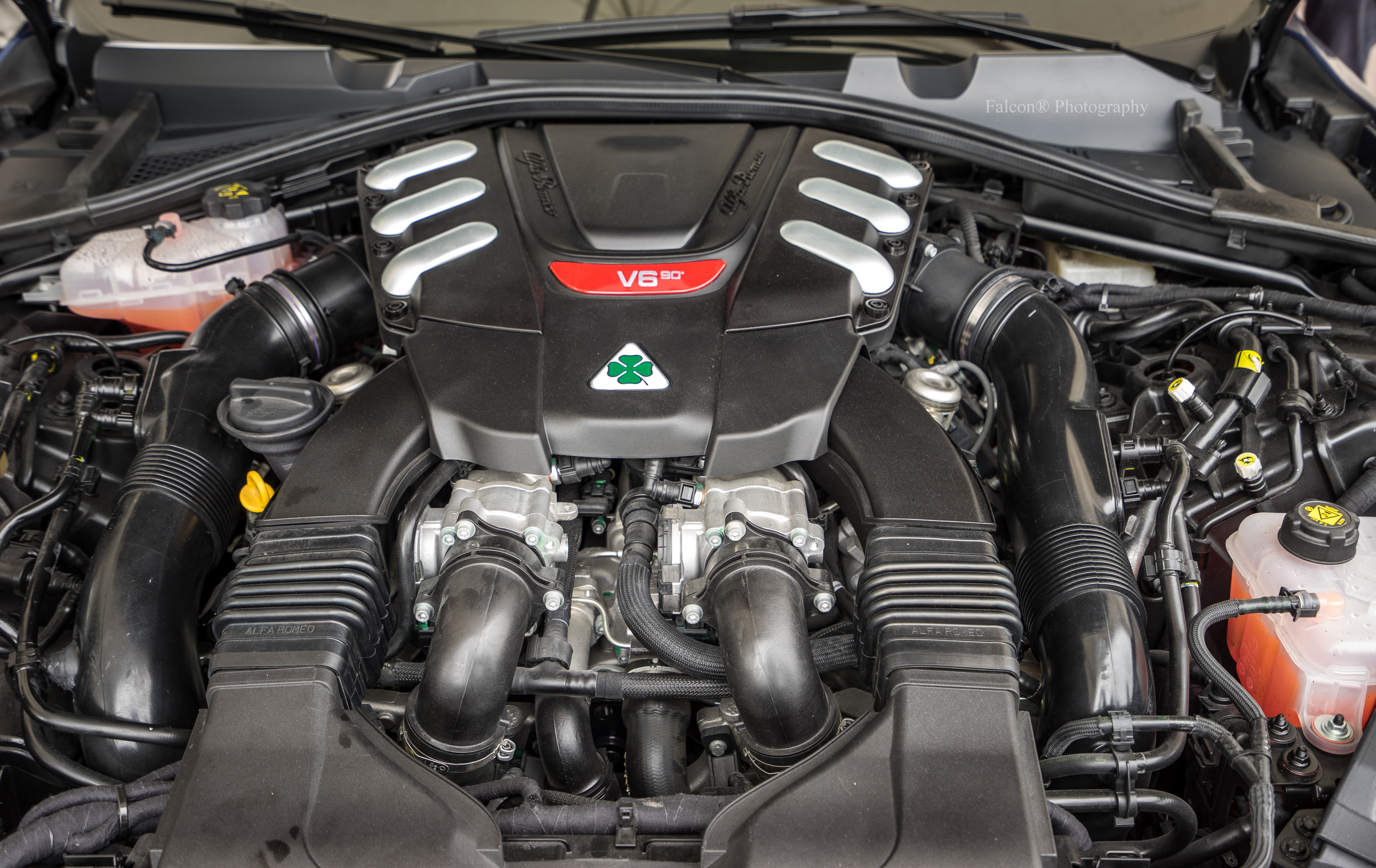
2.9 L V6 Quadrifoglio Twin Turbo engine

The Stelvio uses the same Giorgio platform already used by the Giulia, but slightly modified and raised by 22 cm (8.7 in). The Stelvio also shares the same engines and most of the mechanics, including a carbon-fibre driveshaft. In addition, its track width has increased by 2.9 cm (1.1 in) in the rear and 5.4 cm (2.1 in) in the front. It has a boot capacity of 525 L (18.5 cu ft). The boot sill is aligned with the rear bumper and cargo does not need to be lifted over a lip when being removed. There are large vehicle blind spots behind the car's pillars. It has a 50/50 weight distribution and a drag coefficient of 0.32 (Cd). Euro NCAP classify it as a large off-road car.

In order to reduce the weight of the car, aluminium is used for body panels, as well as for mechanical parts such as the suspension, brakes, and engine. The suspension, called AlfaLink, implements double wishbones in the front, and an aluminium multi-link configuration in the rear. The springs are longer than those in the Giulia, but stiffer to account for the extra weight and ride height. The driver sits nearly 20 cm (7.9 in) higher from the road than in the Giulia. The suspension is tuned for improved handling and driving dynamics, which can compromise ride quality if optional larger-diameter wheels are fitted.

The Stelvio is offered with rear-wheel drive standard, or with an optional Alfa Romeo "Q4" all-wheel drive system that can send up to 50% of power to the front low-grip conditions.The Stelvio weighs 1,660 kg (3,660 lb) with all fluids, 145 kg (320 lb) less than an equivalent BMW X3 and 110 kg (243 lb) less than a four-cylinder Porsche Macan. Its braking system is designed to be less susceptible to fade, a characteristic that can take unfamiliar drivers time to adjust to.

All models feature an 8.8-inch infotainment system with Apple Car Play and Android Auto coming standard, while small tweaks have been made throughout the ranges.

=== Engines and performance ===
The car's engine lineup is similar to that of the Giulia's, with a turbocharged 2.0-litre inline-four and a 2.2-litre diesel inline-four. The Quadrifoglio trim level offers a 2.9 litre 690T twin-turbo 90° V6 rated at 510 PS (375 kW; 503 hp), developed for Alfa Romeo by Ferrari. In Europe, consumption standards use the WLTP measuring system, which increases accuracy for consumption and emission figures. On 29 September 2017, a Quadrifoglio model set a Nürburgring lap time of 7 minutes, 51.7 seconds, the fastest for a production SUV.

Engine/Transmission	Displacement	Max. power output (CE)	Peak torque (CE)	Top speed	0–100 km/h (0–62 mph)	Combined consumption (CE)	CO_{2} emissions (CE)	Regions
Petrol engine range
2.0 L I4 GME T4 MultiAir Turbo AT8 Q4	1,995 cc (121.7 cu in)	200 PS (197 hp; 147 kW)	330 N⋅m (243 lb⋅ft) at 1750 rpm	215 km/h (134 mph)	7.2 s	7.0 L/100 km (40 mpg_{‑imp}; 34 mpg_{‑US})	161	
2.0 L I4 GME T4 MultiAir Turbo AT8 Q4	1,995 cc (121.7 cu in)	250 PS (247 hp; 184 kW)	n/a	n/a	n/a	n/a	n/a	2020+ engine option, detuned to avoid Italian "superbollo" tax
2.0 L I4 GME T4 MultiAir Turbo AT8 Q4	1,995 cc (121.7 cu in)	280 PS (276 hp; 206 kW) at 5250 rpm	400 N⋅m (295 lb⋅ft) at 2,250–4,500 rpm	230 km/h (143 mph)	5.7 s	7.0 L/100 km (40 mpg_{‑imp}; 34 mpg_{‑US})	161	
2.9 L 90° V6 24v Twin turbo 690T AT8 Q4	2,891 cc (176.4 cu in)	510 PS (503 hp; 375 kW) at 6,500 rpm	600 N⋅m (443 lb⋅ft) at 2,500–5,500 rpm	283 km/h (176 mph)	3.8 s			
2.9 L 90° V6 24v Twin turbo 690T MT6	2,891 cc (176.4 cu in)	520 PS (513 hp; 382 kW)	n/a	n/a	n/a	n/a	n/a	limited Racing edition MY2024
Diesel engine range
2.2 L I4 Multijet II AT8	2,143 cc (130.8 cu in)	150 PS (148 hp; 110 kW)	450 N⋅m (332 lb⋅ft) at 1750 rpm	198 km/h (123 mph)	8.8 s	4.7 L/100 km (60 mpg_{‑imp}; 50 mpg_{‑US})	124	
2.2 L I4 Multijet II MT6	2,143 cc (130.8 cu in)	160 PS (158 hp; 118 kW) at 4,000 rpm	450 N⋅m (332 lb⋅ft) at 1,500 rpm	221 km/h (137 mph)	8.2 s	n/a	129	MY2019
2.2 L I4 Multijet II AT8	2,143 cc (130.8 cu in)	180 PS (178 hp; 132 kW)	450 N⋅m (332 lb⋅ft) at 1750 rpm	210 km/h (130 mph)	7.6 s	4.7 L/100 km (60 mpg_{‑imp}; 50 mpg_{‑US})	124	
2.2 L I4 Multijet II AT8 Q4	2,143 cc (130.8 cu in)	180 PS (178 hp; 132 kW)	450 N⋅m (332 lb⋅ft) at 1750 rpm	210 km/h (130 mph)	7.6 s	4.8 L/100 km (59 mpg_{‑imp}; 49 mpg_{‑US})	127	
2.2 L I4 Multijet II MT6	2,143 cc (130.8 cu in)	190 PS (187 hp; 140 kW) at 3,750 rpm	450 N⋅m (332 lb⋅ft) at 1,750 rpm	230 km/h (143 mph)	7.6 s	n/a	149	MY2019
2.2 L I4 Multijet II AT8 Q4	2,143 cc (130.8 cu in)	210 PS (207 hp; 154 kW)	470 N⋅m (347 lb⋅ft) at 1750 rpm	215 km/h (134 mph)	6.6 s	4.8 L/100 km (59 mpg_{‑imp}; 49 mpg_{‑US})	127	
AT8 eight speed automatic transmission, Q4 all wheel drive.

==== North American engines and performance ====
Engine and transmission	Displacement	Max. power	Peak torque	Top speed	0–60 mph (0–97 km/h)	EPA fuel economy combined	Notes
Petrol engine range
2.0 L I4 GME MultiAir Turbo AT8 Q4	1,995 cc (121.7 cu in)	280 hp (284 PS; 209 kW)	306 lb⋅ft (415 N⋅m)	144 mph (232 km/h)	5.4 s	24 mpg_{‑US} (9.8 L/100 km; 29 mpg_{‑imp})	
2.9 L 90° V6 24v Twin turbo 690T AT8	2,891 cc (176.4 cu in)	505 hp (512 PS; 377 kW)	443 lb⋅ft (600 N⋅m)	177 mph (285 km/h)	3.6 s	19 mpg_{‑US} (12 L/100 km; 23 mpg_{‑imp})	

=== Safety ===
ANCAP test results* Alfa Romeo Stelvio 2.0L petrol & 2.2L diesel variants (2017, aligned with Euro NCAP)
Test	Points	%
Overall:	5 /5 stars	
Adult occupant:	37	97%
Child occupant:	41.6	84%
Pedestrian:	30.2	71%
Safety assist:	7.2	60%

Euro NCAP test results* Alfa Romeo Stelvio (2017)
Test	Points	%
Overall:	5 /5 stars	
Adult occupant:	37	97%
Child occupant:	41.6	84%
Pedestrian:	30.2	71%
Safety assist:	7.3	60%

The Stelvio was crash tested in July 2017 by Euro NCAP. Overall, the Stelvio achieved five-star results. For adult protection, it did "exceptionally well", with its 97% score matching that of the Volvo XC90 (all tests are not comparable because Euro NCAP updated its protocols in 2017). The organisation found that the Stelvio generally did well at protecting adult occupants in a crash, though it was noted that protection of a rear passenger's chest was only adequate. For child occupants the Stelvio also performed at-least adequately except for protecting the neck of the dummy representing a ten-year-old child, which it was weak at in the frontal-offset test. They found that the bonnet is generally at-least adequate at protecting a pedestrian's head in an impact but that the windscreen and a-pillars did a bad job at protecting a pedestrian's head. The bumper was found to protect pedestrians' legs well in a collision but the area above the bumper varied in how well it protected a struck pedestrian's pelvis. The organisation said the Stelvio's autonomous emergency braking system "performed well" in their tests but found operating the driver-set speed limiter to be "too complicated".

The Stelvio is also fitted with an autonomous emergency braking system (AEB) as standard.

== History and development ==
Preceded by Alfa Romeo's first off-roader, the Matta, in the 1950s and the Kamal concept car in March 2003, the Stelvio is Alfa Romeo's first production SUV. The high-performance trim of the Stelvio, the Quadrifoglio, was unveiled on 16 November 2016 at the Los Angeles Auto Show. The European versions of the Stelvio were presented at the Geneva Motor Show in March 2017. On January 18, 2017, Alfa Romeo began accepting orders for the Stelvio First Edition in the EMEA region. On November 2, 2017, the Stelvio Quadrifoglio went on sale in Italy.

For the 2019 model year, diesel engines of the Stelvio were updated to meet the Euro 6d emissions standards, with AdBlue technology introduced to tackle particulates in the exhaust. Both the 150 PS (110 kW; 148 hp) and 180 PS (132 kW; 178 hp) versions got 10 PS (7 kW; 10 hp) more from this change. In addition, Alfa Romeo introduced a new trim level for Europe: the Ti (Turismo Internazionale). Slightly different than the similarly named Stelvio Ti on sale in the United States, the Euro-spec Ti is fitted with the TBI-M 2.0-litre inline-four, mated to an eight-speed automatic transmission, with power sent to all four wheels through Alfa Romeo's Q4 all-wheel drive system. In 2020, Alfa Romeo introduced the newly updated Stelvio in China, with both the Giulia and the Stelvio featuring updated interiors, a new 8.8-inch touchscreen for the infotainment system, which now offers a WiFi hotspot, over-the-air software upgrades, integrated emergency call function, and call assistant function. There is the new leather-wrapped multi-function steering wheel and gear lever, with revised dashboard materials. The debut for North America was in the 2019 LA Auto Show. As of 2022 in North America, the Stelvio has four distinct models. Starting with the base model Sprint, the Ti, the Veloce and the top-of-the-line Quadrifoglio. In light of the Alfa Romeo Tonale's release, Stelvio's range of models was condensed from seven to four.

=== Special editions ===
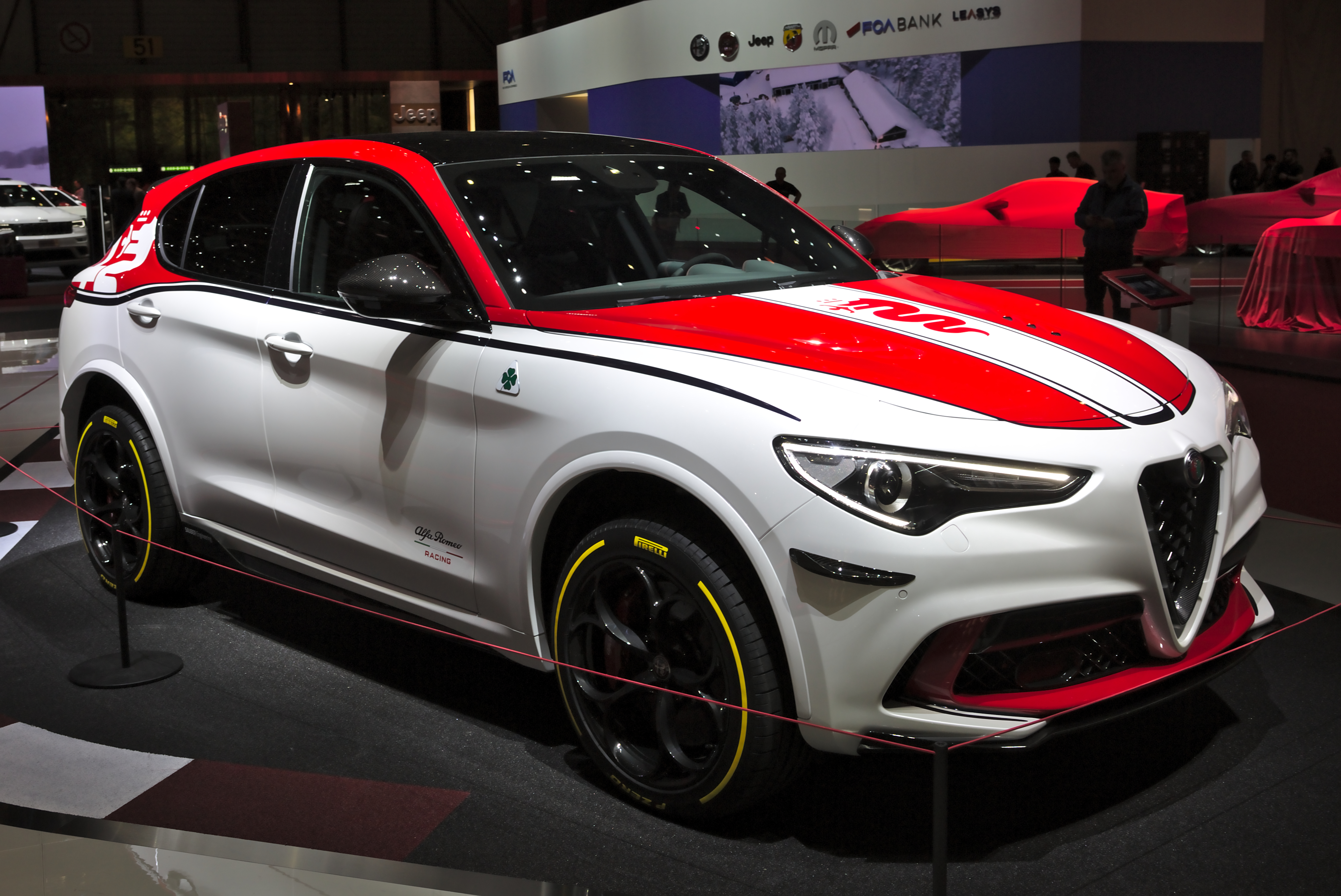

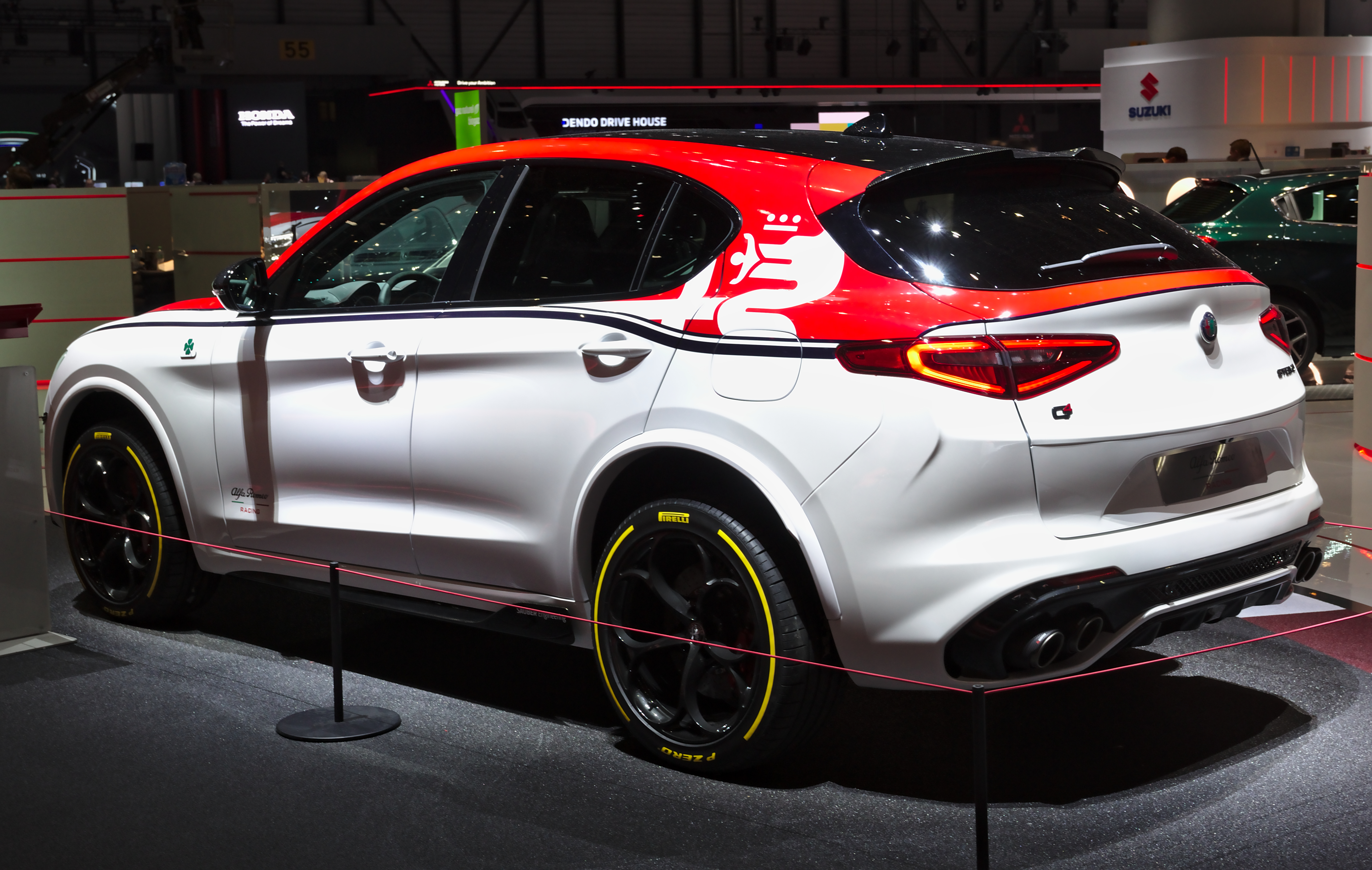
Stelvio Q Racing Edition

==== Quadrifoglio NRING Edition ====
At the 2018 Geneva Motor Show, a limited edition (only 108 examples) NRING trim of the Stelvio (Nürburgring-inspired special edition) was unveiled. The NRING edition has carbon-ceramic brakes, Sparco seats, carbon-fiber interior trim, and a Mopar-branded gear shifter and floor mats. The cars are differentiated on the exterior by NRING badges as well as carbon-fiber mirror caps and side skirts. Equipment is upgraded to include adaptive cruise control, and a premium sound system.

==== Nero Edizione ====
In April 2018, NYIAS unveiled a Nero Edizione Package for the Stelvio. This edition grants a new exterior appearance through special blacked-out wheels, badging, and other touches. The Nero Edizione package is available only for the 280 horsepower, 2.0-litre model.

==== Quadrifoglio Racing Edition ====
At the 2019 Geneva International Motor Show, Alfa Romeo Racing limited edition was introduced, which celebrates Alfa Romeo's legendary racing history and the entry of a new Italian driver onto the Formula 1 scene: Antonio Giovinazzi joins the "Alfa Romeo Racing" team with World Champion Kimi Räikkönen. This special edition has exclusive paintwork, as a tribute to the Alfa Romeo Racing C38 Formula 1 car.

Carbon-fibre parts, an Akrapovič titanium exhaust system, and other tweaks shave off about 28 kg (62 lb) from the standard Quadrifoglio version. The retuned engine now produces 520 PS (382 kW; 513 hp). Only 15 were reportedly built (with one source saying 14).

=== Sales ===
Calendar Year	United States	Europe
2017	2,721	17,159
2018	12,043	30,099
2019	9,444	26,866
2020	10,284	17,438
2021	10,539	16,650
2022	7,752	
2023	5,340	
2024	3,162	
2025	1,872	
2026 Q1-Q3	953	
Total Sales	63,157	

== 2023 refresh ==
For 2023, the Stelvio, as well as the Giulia receive significant facelifts. For the front, the bi-xenon headlamps are replaced with 3+3 headlamps, which are a part of Alfa Romeo's new design language and which were first seen on the Tonale. The vehicle receives a restyled grille and sequential turn signals. For the rear, the taillights see a more transparent finish and a minor redesign.

Interior changes include a new 12.3-inch digital instrument cluster which offers three layouts: Evolved, Relax, and Heritage.

Starting with the 2023 refresh (model year 2024+ in the U.S.) a number of special editions (none of which with power increases) have been released. The non-Quadrifoglio special editions are similar to the pre-refresh Estrema special edition, with minor appearance updates and Active Suspension to set them apart from Ti and Veloce trims of the same model year.

- Quadrifoglio 100th Anniversary (100 units worldwide)
- Quadrifoglio Carbon Edition (65 units for North America)
- Quadrifoglio Super Sport (175 units worldwide)
- Quadrifoglio Collezione (63 units worldwide, excluded from North America)
- Competizione
- Tributo Italiano
- Intensa
- Edizione Luna Rossa
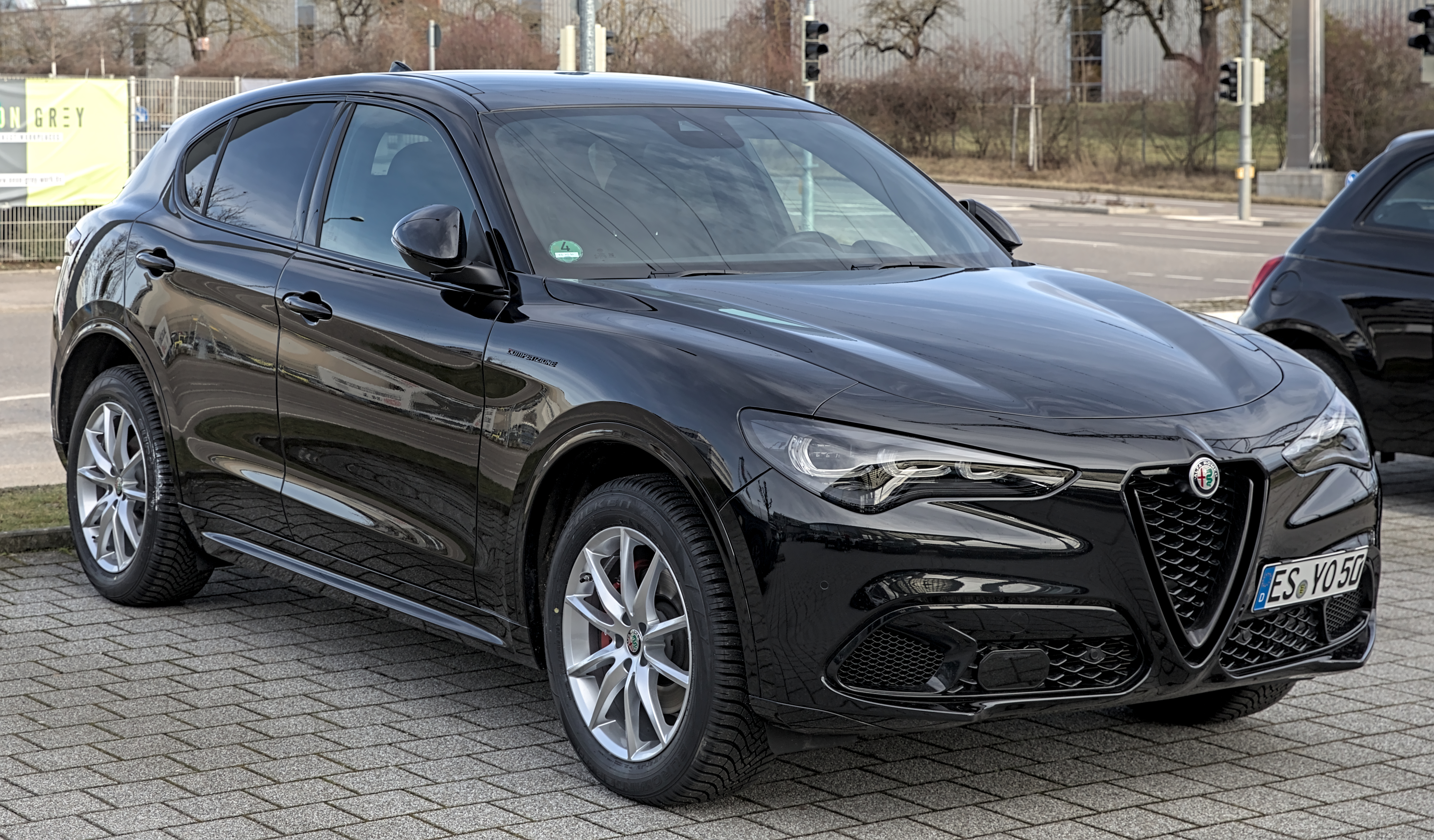
Front view (Stelvio Q4)

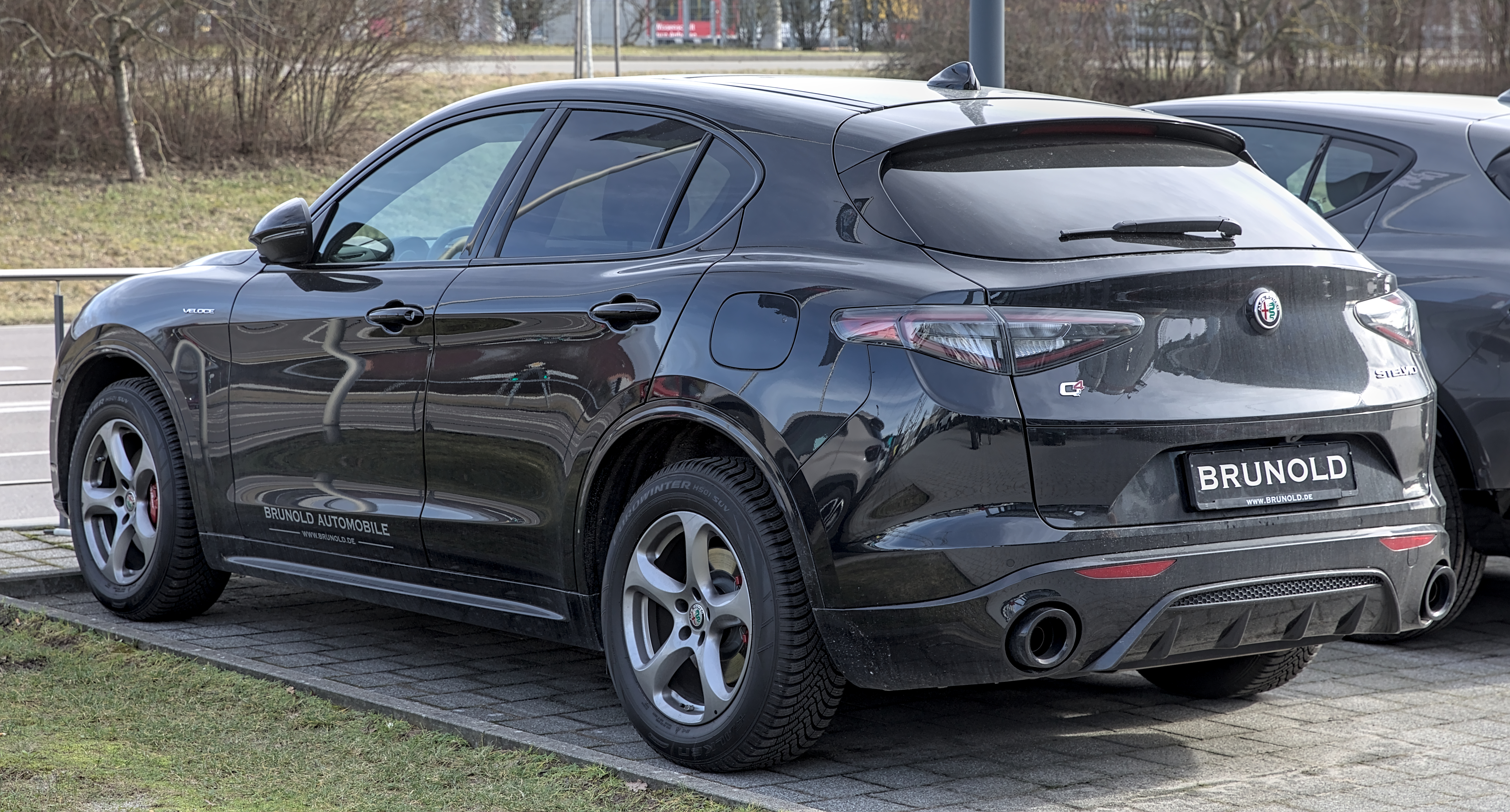
Rear view (Stelvio Q4)

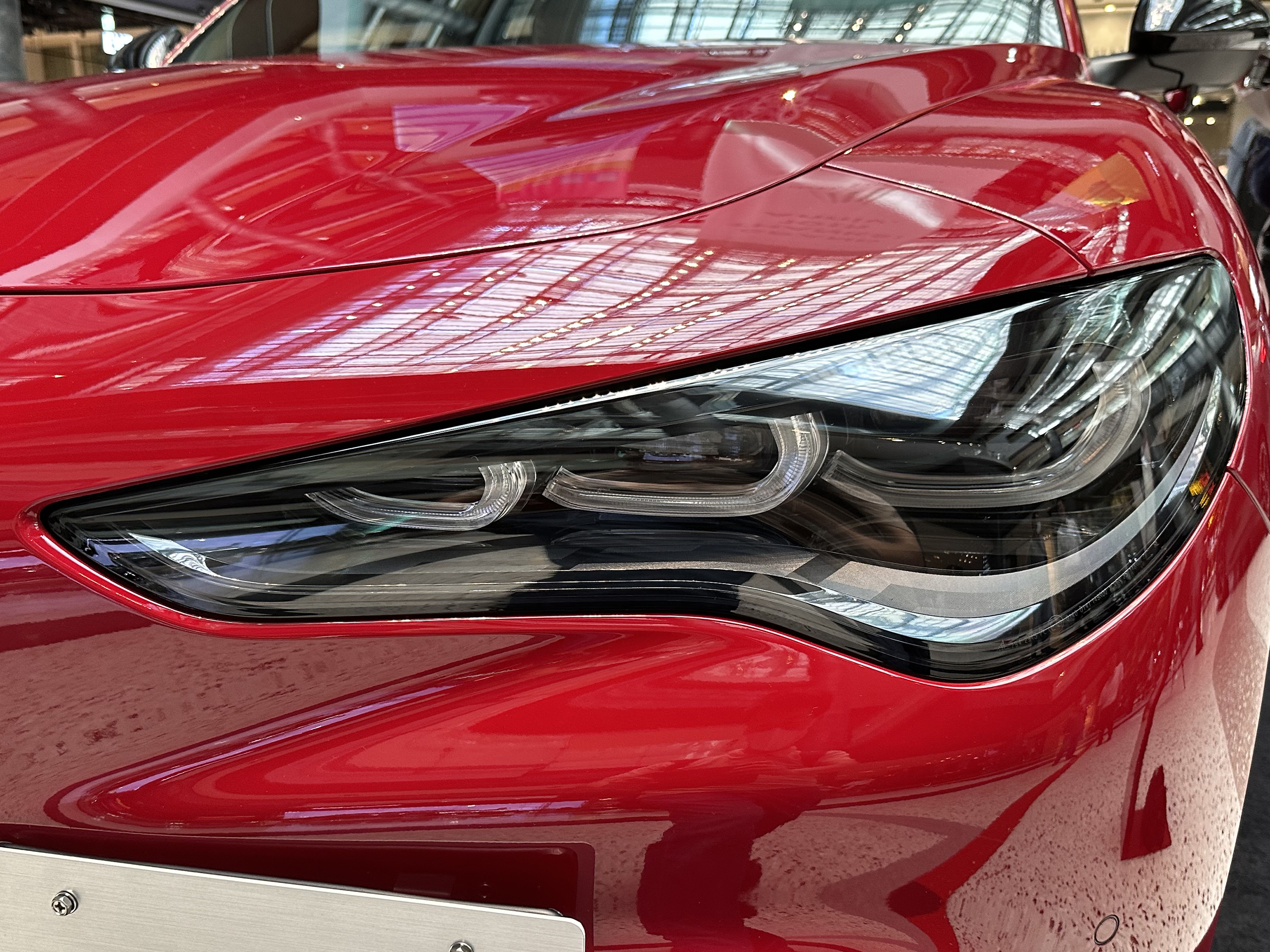
3+3 headlamp

== Awards ==
Awards from automotive industry groups and media publishers included:

- 2018 'Crossover of the Year' By Popular Mechanics.
- Car and Driver 2018 Editors’ Choice
- ‘SUV of the Year 2018’ for Auto Zeitung
- Performance SUV of the Year by AVA
- CUV of Texas by Texas Auto Writers Association
- ArabWheels Award 2018
- 2019 Readers' Choice Awards by the Auto motor und sport
- 2019 What Car? "Performance SUV of the Year 2019"
- 2019 Auto Bild Magazine win of the category of "Design", "Best Brands" competition.
