= Alfa Romeo 690T engine =

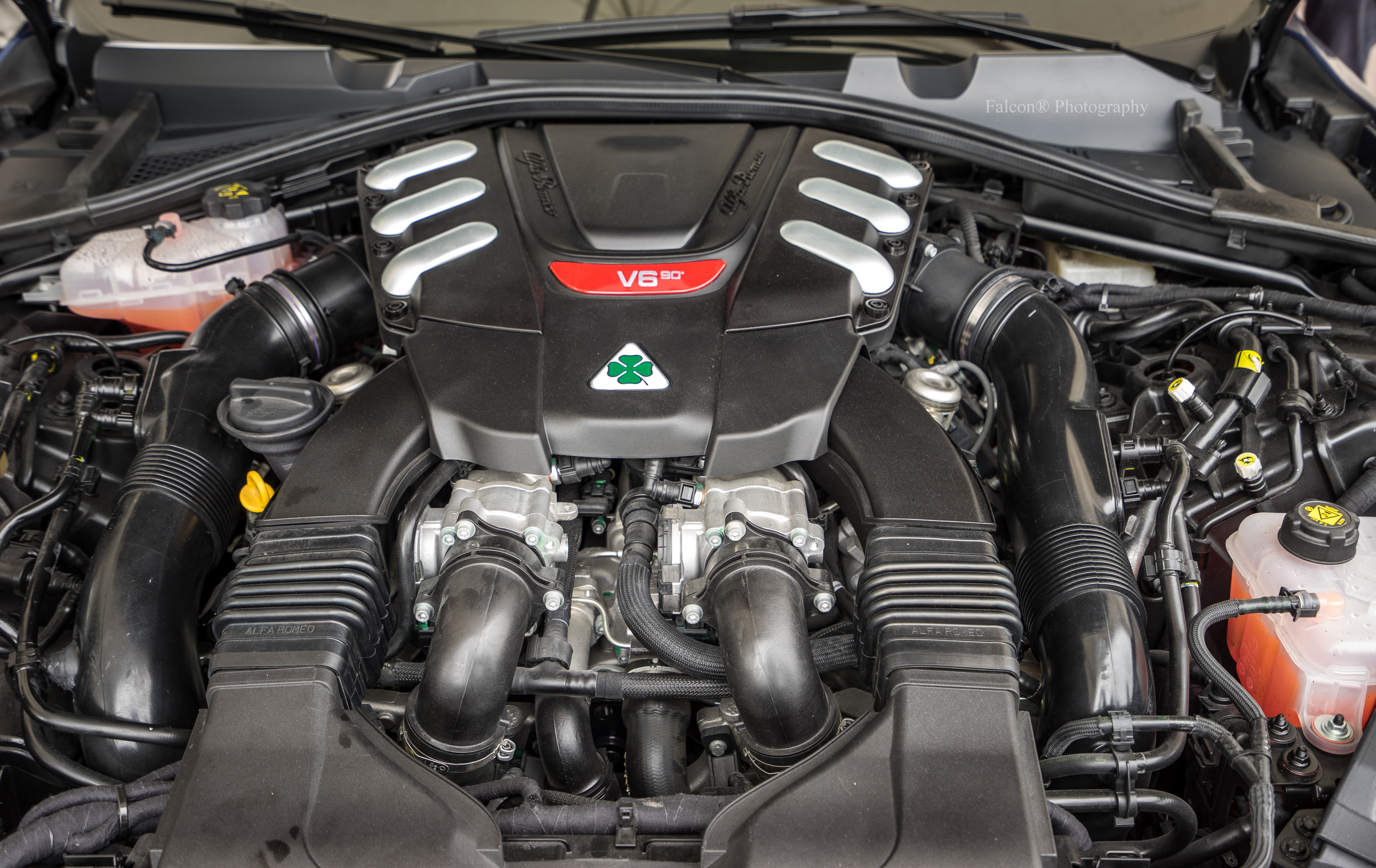
- 2016 Giulia Quadrifoglio engine bay

Overview
- Manufacturer: Alfa Romeo
- Designer: Gianluca Pivetti
- Production: 2015–present

Layout
- Configuration: 90° V6
- Displacement: 2.9 L (2,891 cc)
- Cylinder bore: 86.5 mm (3.41 in)
- Piston stroke: 82.0 mm (3.23 in)
- Cylinder block material: Closed-deck aluminium with wet steel cylinder liners
- Cylinder head material: Aluminium
- Valvetrain: DOHC, 24-valve with continuous camshaft phasing
- Valvetrain drive system: Chains
- Compression ratio: 9.3:1

RPM range
- Idle speed: 950
- Max. engine speed: 7,400 rpm

Combustion
- Turbocharger: Two single-scroll parallel turbochargers (IHI) with air-to-liquid intercoolers
- Fuel system: Port and direct injection
- Management: 2× Bosch Motronic
- Fuel type: Petrol
- Oil system: Wet sump with water heat exchanger, two-speed oil pump, 7 L (7.2 US qt)
- Cooling system: Water-cooled, low- and high-temperature systems each with main and additional radiators

Output
- Power output: 375–397 kW (510–540 PS; 503–533 hp) @ 6,500 rpm
- Specific power: 138 kW (187 PS; 184 hp) per liter
- Torque output: 600 N⋅m (443 lb⋅ft) @ 2,500-5,400 rpm

Dimensions
- Length: 905 mm (35.6 in)
- Width: 860 mm (34 in)
- Height: 505 mm (19.9 in)
- Dry weight: 218 kg (481 lb)

Chronology
- Predecessor: Alfa Romeo JTS engine

The Alfa Romeo 690T is a twin-turbocharged, direct injected, 90° V6 petrol engine designed and produced by Alfa Romeo since 2015. It is used in the high-performance Giulia Quadrifoglio and Stelvio Quadrifoglio models and is manufactured at the Alfa Romeo Termoli engine plant.

== History ==
In May 2013, FCA CEO Sergio Marchionne brought engineer Gianluca Pivetti from Ferrari to develop a new engine for the upcoming Alfa Romeo Giulia Quadrifoglio, a flagship car meant to relaunch the brand. Pivetti along with Giorgio platform chief Philippe Krief and a team of a dozen engineers began development in Modena in July. Given a short three year deadline, the team gained technical approval of the engine within a year and a half. It then moved into development with the FCA engine plant in Termoli and was production ready in 2015.

The 690T (Note: Internal code is A001.) is often considered to be the Ferrari F154 engine with two fewer cylinders, but in fact it is a completely new engine developed specifically for the Giulia Quadrifoglio by the same engineer, Pivetti. (Note: Pivetti's last project at Ferrari was the California T's F154 engine.) Nevertheless, Alfa adopted similar known geometries, technologies, and materials they knew worked well to reduce development time.

The engine was created as part of the larger Giorgio project, which arose from the need to give Alfa Romeo its own new and specific architecture, designed and produced entirely in Italy, in keeping with the brand's original character. An important design requirement was the deactivation of one cylinder bank in order to satisfy efficiency goals along with performance, as its application was to be broader than only super sports cars.

Pivetti likened its uneven firing 90-degree V6 configuration to Formula 1 engines, (Note: Formula 1 engine regulations since 2014 stipulate 90-degree V6 with shared crankpins.) and examples in the company's past, including the 1996 Alfa Romeo 155 V6 TI's 690 engine, and V6 engines used in the Maserati Merak, Biturbo, and Ghibli II.

With their sights set on the Nürburgring lap record for a sedan, Alfa Romeo projected the Giulia needed around 338 kW (460 PS; 454 hp). As development progressed, that power target was set higher until it reached its final form of 375 kW (510 PS; 503 hp).

When it was released, the engine was noteworthy as having more power than its contemporary rival, the BMW M3. In terms of sound, Alfa Romeo targeted the engine note of the Busso V6 in the 147 GTA and 156 GTA, working with the intake and compensating with the exhaust. Evo magazine noted, "the turbo V6 isn’t yowlingly sonorous, but it sounds throatily aggressive and much more characterful than BMW’s M3". Power delivery was meant to be progressive and engaging for the driver. Top Gear host Chris Harris said, “in terms of a turbocharged motor that really goes at the top end, this might be the best one I’ve ever driven”.

The maintenance plan calls for an accessory drive belt replacement at 4 years or 60,000 km (36,000 mi), which requires removing the bumper to gain access, but may be done more simply.

Alfa Romeo added port injection to comply with Euro 6d emissions regulations. Alfa plans to continue production of the engine, though it is unsure if it can be made compliant with Euro 7.

Alfa Romeo Termoli plant manufactures the engine, producing 39,833 units from 2015 to 2024. (Note: Production number is calculated as the sum of Alfa Romeo engines over 2500 cc for the years 2015–2024.) Investment for production of the 2.0 and 2.9L engines was over 1.5 billion euros.

== Specifications ==
The 690T is a V6 engine with a 90 degree cylinder bank angle, 86.5 mm (3.41 in) bore, 82.0 mm (3.23 in) stroke, (Note: Larger bore than the stroke makes this an oversquare design.) a displacement of 2.9 L (2,891 cc), and two single-scroll turbochargers. In its standard configuration, it produces 375 kW (510 PS; 503 hp) at 6,500 rpm and 600 N⋅m (443 lb⋅ft) of torque at 2,500–5,400 rpm.

=== Construction ===
The crankshaft has three non-split crankpins 120 degrees apart, each with two connecting rods mounted side by side. This allows the engine to be shorter and the crank to be stronger and stiffer, while the 90 degree bank angle gives it a lower center of gravity. The engine is designed as two independent 3-cylinder engines mated to a common crank, with each cylinder bank having its own engine controller, intake, and turbocharger to allow for cylinder bank deactivation.

This configuration results in uneven firing at 90 and 150 degrees of rotation, but for each cylinder bank results in even firing every 240 degrees, providing evenly-spaced exhaust pulses to each turbocharger and allows one bank to deactivate. The firing order is 1-6-3-4-2-5. (Note: Cylinder are numbered clockwise with cylinder 1 at the front-right.) The odd-firing interval gives the engine a unique sound. It has a harmonic order of 1.5, half of a typical even-firing V6 and the same as an inline-three, so that during cylinder deactivation, no difference in vibration can be discerned. Alfa Romeo found it unnecessary to use a balance shaft or active engine mounts to filter engine imbalances. A viscous torsional damper is mounted on the crankshaft.

The closed-deck aluminum engine block is made by Mazzucconi in Bergamo, Italy, using low-pressure die casting. The aluminum cylinder heads are also made by Mazzucconi, as tier 2 supplier to Magneti Marelli, using tilt casting. For increased rigidity, the bearing caps and the lower crankcase are cast from aluminum in one piece as a bedplate and joined to the upper crankcase by 16 bolts. The oil pan is also made of aluminum. Borrowing a technique from motorcycles and Ferrari engines, (Note: Ferrari uses reed valves in the same manner on the F140 V12 and F154 V8.) the lower crankcase and oil pan are separated by three reed valves which scavenge the oil vapor from the crankcase to create a low pressure area under the pistons. This gains 30 hp (22 kW) by the reduction of pumping losses.

The pistons are made of cast aluminum with graphite coating and run in wet steel cylinder liners. The sliding surfaces of the cylinder liners are coated with silicon carbide, which limits blow-by and reduces oil consumption. Mahle GmbH manufactures the pistons, piston pins, and cylinder liners. The connecting rods are forged steel. The crankshaft is made of vanadium-alloyed steel and is forged from a 9 kg (20 lb) blank. It is then hardened by gas nitriding, as is done by Ferrari. The main bearings are an aluminum alloy with bismuth and silver.

=== Valvetrain ===
The valvetrain has four overhead camshafts (DOHC) driven by two timing chains, one for each cylinder bank. The four valves per cylinder are actuated by roller rocker arms supported by hydraulic lifters. The intake valves are hollow and the exhaust valves are sodium-filled. Variable valve timing is accomplished by hydraulically phasing the intake and exhaust camshafts.

The right cylinder bank has collapsible hydraulic tappets to shut the intake and exhaust valves during cylinder deactivation. A solenoid valve interrupts oil flow to the stationary turbocharger, as otherwise oil would leak through the dynamic seals into the exhaust. Cylinder deactivation increases fuel economy by seven percent by the reduction of pumping losses. The system activates when deemed beneficial for fuel efficiency at certain speeds and torque levels.

=== Turbochargers ===
The engine has water-cooled single-scroll (Note: Only single-scroll is needed for three cylinders as exhaust pulses do not overlap.) parallel twin-turbochargers made by IHI, integrated into the exhaust manifolds on the sides of the engine. They are "pressure impulse" type, where each cylinder's exhaust is directly connected to the turbine to maximize performance. Wastegates are vacuum-actuated. (Note: A vacuum pump supplies power to actuate the wastegates as well as the active exhaust valves.) Maximum boost is 1.4 bars (20 psi) gauge pressure.

=== Fuel system ===
The engine uses port and direct injection, (Note: In this configuration, injectors are side-mounted with single central spark plugs, unlike the Alfa Romeo Twin Spark engines.) with fuel pressure at 200 bars (2,900 psi).

=== Cooling & lubrication ===
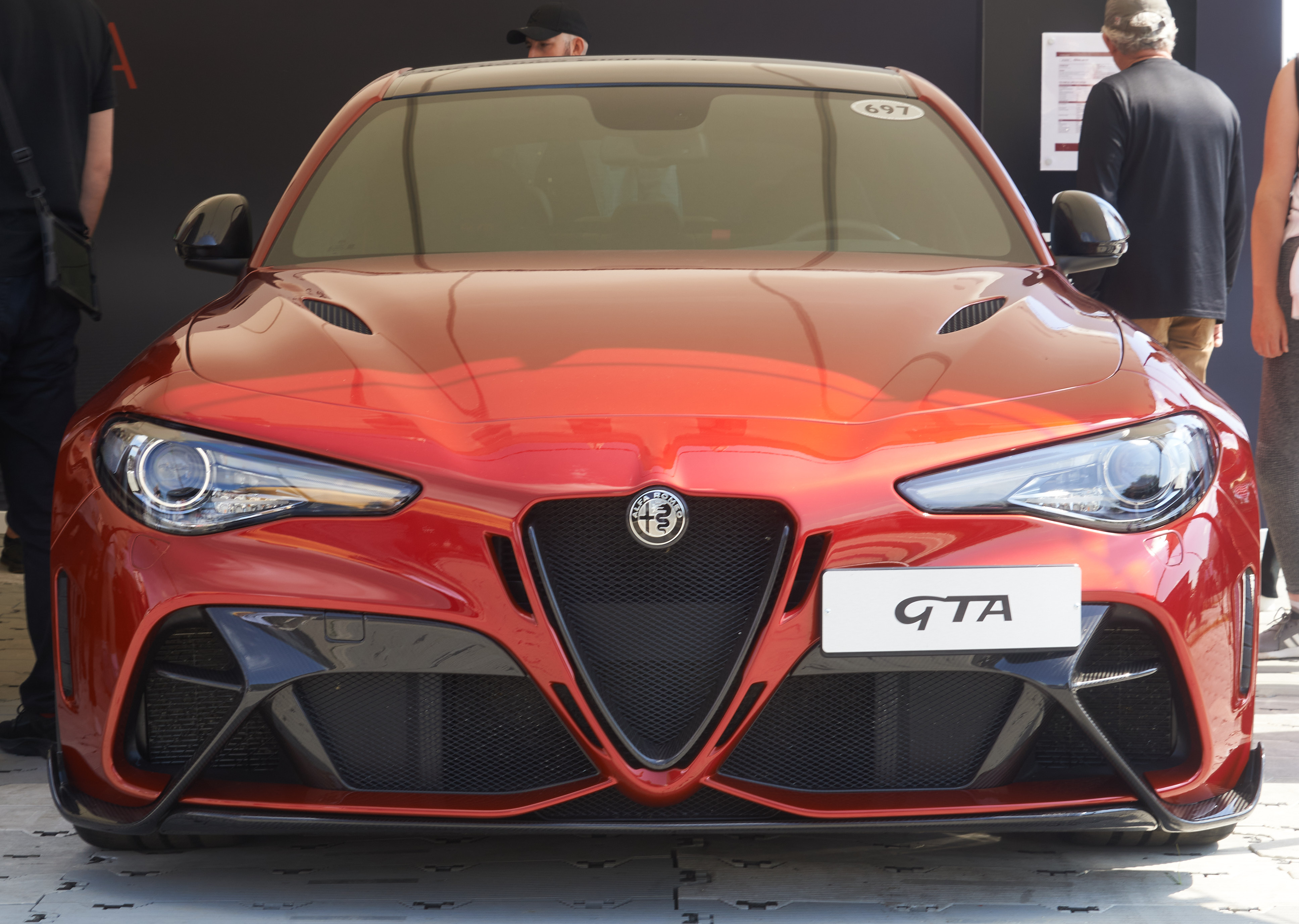
From the front view of the GTA model, additional radiators for the high temperature (lower right) and low temperature (lower left) circuits

The primary high temperature cooling circuit cools the engine, oil, and turbocharger via a mechanically driven water pump. The water flows through the engine laterally, from the outside in, to cool all cylinders evenly. The double-stage thermostat and other parts of the cooling system including the radiators are made by Mahle. Two air-to-liquid charge air coolers, one for each cylinder bank, dissipate the heat of compression via a secondary low temperature cooling circuit with an electric water pump.

The variable speed oil pump generates pressures of either 1.5 or 4.1 bar (22 or 59 psi) depending on engine speed, load, and temperature. Pumping a lower pressure reduces fuel consumption. It is driven by a chain, in a 1:1 ratio, via a sprocket on the crankshaft. A plate heat exchanger for cooling the oil is located in the inside the V between the cylinder banks.

=== GTA and GTAm ===
For the GTA and GTAm models the engine was upgraded with reinforced connecting rods, additional piston oil jets, improved oil cooler, and higher boost to make 397 kW (540 PS; 533 hp).

== Applications ==
The engine is used in the following models:

- Alfa Romeo Giulia Quadrifoglio
- Alfa Romeo Stelvio Quadrifoglio
- Alfa Romeo Giulia GTA and GTAm
- Alfa Romeo Giulia SWB Zagato
- Alfa Romeo 33 Stradale

The engine sends power through the ZF 8HP 75 automatic transmission. In Europe Alfa Romeo also offered the ZF S6-53 manual transmission until 2018.

The Maserati 3.0-litre V6 Nettuno engine, introduced in the Maserati MC20, shares many characteristics with the Alfa Romeo 690T and the Ferrari F154 engines.

The Alfa Romeo 33 Stradale features a larger 3.0-litre version of the engine, an evolution of the Nettuno, producing 456 kW (620 PS).

=== Alfa Romeo ===
Eng. code	Displacement Bore x stroke	Years	Usage	Peak power	Peak torque
690T	2,891.26 cc (176 cu in) 86.5 x 82 mm 481.877 cc (29 cu in) per cylinder	2016–present	Giulia Quadrifoglio Stelvio Quadrifoglio	510 PS (375 kW; 503 hp) at 6500 rpm	600 N⋅m (443 lbf⋅ft) from 2500 to 5000 rpm
690T	2,891.26 cc (176 cu in) 86.5 x 82 mm 481.877 cc (29 cu in) per cylinder	2016–2024	Giulia Quadrifoglio Stelvio Quadrifoglio (North America)	512 PS (377 kW; 505 hp) at 6500 rpm	600 N⋅m (443 lbf⋅ft) from 2500 to 5000 rpm
690T	2,891.26 cc (176 cu in) 86.5 x 82 mm 481.877 cc (29 cu in) per cylinder	2019	Giulia Quadrifoglio Racing Edition Stelvio Quadrifoglio Racing Edition	520 PS (382 kW; 513 hp) at 6500 rpm	600 N⋅m (443 lbf⋅ft) from 2500 to 5000 rpm
690T	2,891.26 cc (176 cu in) 86.5 x 82 mm 481.877 cc (29 cu in) per cylinder	2023–present	Giulia Quadrifoglio Stelvio Quadrifoglio (Europe, UK & China)	520 PS (382 kW; 513 hp) at 6500 rpm	600 N⋅m (443 lbf⋅ft) from 2500 to 5000 rpm
690T	2,891.26 cc (176 cu in) 86.5 x 82 mm 481.877 cc (29 cu in) per cylinder	2020	Giulia GTA / GTAm Giulia SWB Zagato	540 PS (397 kW; 533 hp) at 6500 rpm	600 N⋅m (443 lbf⋅ft) from 2500 to 5000 rpm
