= Ferrari F154 engine =

F154
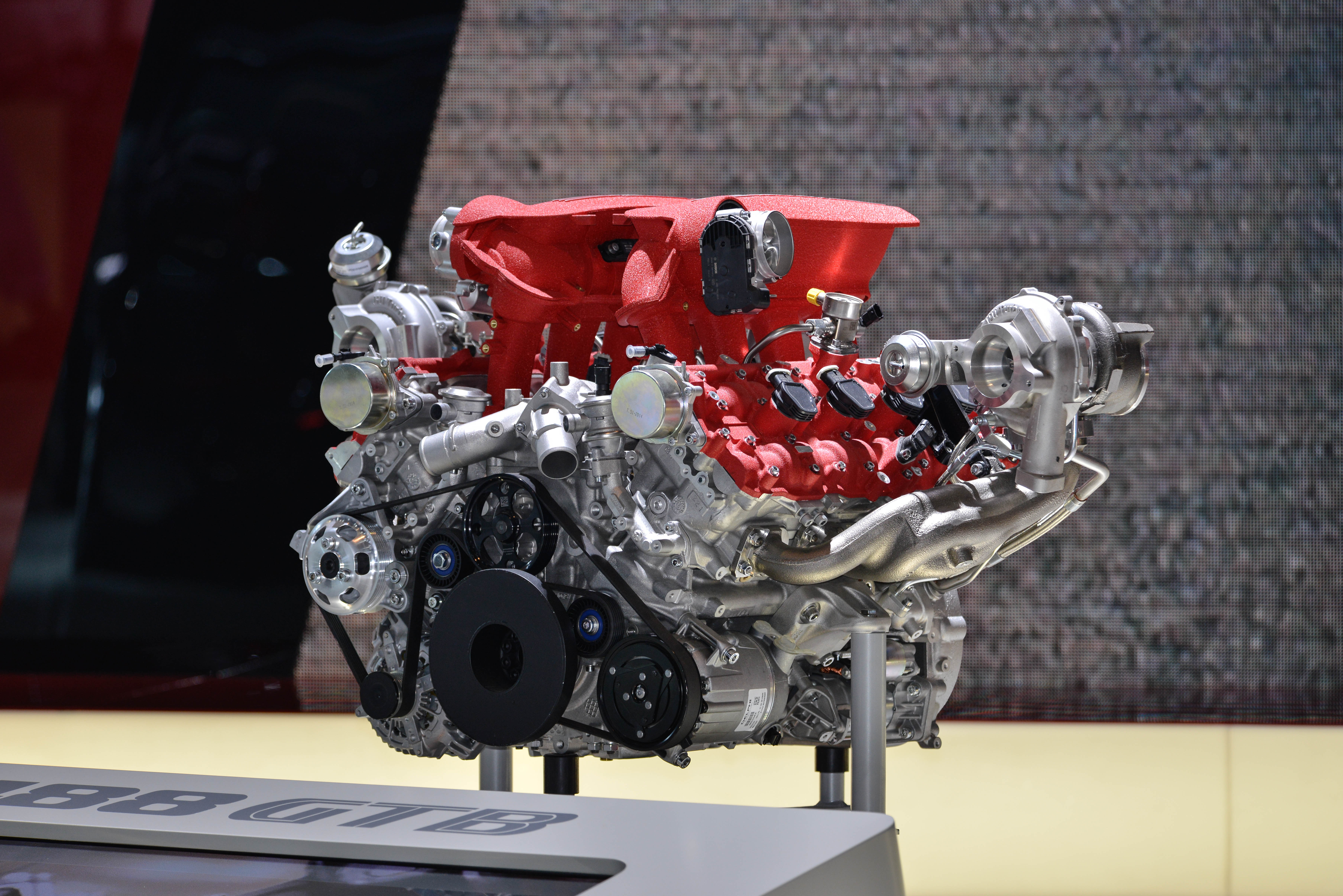
- The F154 CB engine of the Ferrari 488 GTB

Overview
- Manufacturer: Ferrari
- Designer: Gianluca Pivetti
- Production: 2013–present

Layout
- Configuration: 90° V8
- Displacement: 3.8 L (3,799 cc); 3.9 L (3,855 cc); 3.9 L (3,902 cc); 4.0 L (3,990 cc); 4.0 L (3,996 cc)
- Cylinder bore: 86.5 mm (3.4 in); 88 mm (3.5 in)
- Piston stroke: 80.8 mm (3.2 in); 83 mm (3.3 in); 82 mm (3.2 in)
- Cylinder block material: Aluminium
- Cylinder head material: Aluminium
- Valvetrain: DOHC, 32-valve

RPM range
- Max. engine speed: 7,200-8,000 RPM

Combustion
- Turbocharger: Two twin-scroll parallel turbochargers
- Fuel system: Gasoline direct injection
- Fuel type: Petrol
- Oil system: Dry sump
- Cooling system: Water cooled

Chronology
- Predecessor: Ferrari-Maserati F136 V8 engine

The Ferrari F154 is a family of modular twin-turbocharged, direct injected V8 petrol engines designed and produced by Ferrari since 2013. It is a replacement for the naturally aspirated Ferrari-Maserati F136 V8 family on both Maserati and Ferrari cars. They are the first turbocharged Ferrari road engines since the 1987 2.9-litre F120A V8 of the Ferrari F40.

== Description ==
The F154 V8 engines have a 90° angle between the cylinder banks, aluminium block and heads. The forced induction system uses two parallel twin-scroll water-cooled turbochargers supplied by IHI and two air-to-air intercoolers. The valvetrain consists of 4 valves per cylinder actuated through roller finger followers by two overhead camshafts per bank; the timing chain is located on the flywheel side. All Ferrari versions feature gasoline direct injection and continuously variable valve timing on both intake and exhaust side.

The Ferrari version of the engine has a flatplane crankshaft and dry sump lubrication. In order to obtain equal length pipes, the exhaust manifolds are manufactured from multiple welded cast steel pieces; the turbocharger housing uses a similar three-piece construction.

The Maserati version has a crossplane crankshaft and wet sump lubrication. Turbine housings and exhaust manifolds are integrated in a single piece. On the Quattroporte, the engine has an overboost function which raises maximum torque from 650 N⋅m (479 lbf⋅ft) between 2000 and 4000 rpm to 710 N⋅m (524 lbf⋅ft) between 2250 and 3500 rpm.

The Maserati MC20's 3.0-litre V6 Nettuno engine shares many of its characteristics with the Ferrari F154 and the Alfa Romeo 690T.

== Applications ==
=== Ferrari ===
Eng. code	Displacement Bore x stroke	Years	Usage	Peak power	Peak torque
F154 BB	3,855 cc (235 cu in); 86.5 x 82 mm 481.88 cc (29 cu in) per cylinder	2014–2017	Ferrari California T	410 kW; 550 hp (560 PS) at 7500 rpm	755 N⋅m (557 lbf⋅ft) at 4750 rpm
F154 BD	3,855 cc (235 cu in); 86.5 x 82 mm 481.88 cc (29 cu in) per cylinder	2017–2020	Ferrari GTC4Lusso T	450 kW; 600 hp (610 PS) at 7500 rpm	760 N⋅m (561 lbf⋅ft) at 3000 rpm
F154 BE	3,855 cc (235 cu in); 86.5 x 82 mm 481.88 cc (29 cu in) per cylinder	2018–2020	Ferrari Portofino	440 kW; 590 hp (600 PS) at 7500 rpm	760 N⋅m (561 lbf⋅ft) at 3000 rpm
F154 BH	3,855 cc (235 cu in); 86.5 x 82 mm 481.88 cc (29 cu in) per cylinder	2020–present	Ferrari Portofino M Ferrari Roma; Ferrari Roma Spider; Ferrari Amalfi	460 kW; 610 hp (620 PS) between 5,750 and 7,500 rpm	760 N⋅m (561 lbf⋅ft) between 3,000 and 5,750 rpm
F154 CB	3,902 cc (238 cu in); 86.5 x 83 mm 487.75 cc (30 cu in) per cylinder	2015–2019	Ferrari 488 GTB; Ferrari 488 Spider	490 kW; 660 hp (670 PS) at 8000 rpm	760 N⋅m (561 lbf⋅ft) at 3000 rpm
F154 CD	3,902 cc (238 cu in); 86.5 x 83 mm 487.75 cc (30 cu in) per cylinder	2018–2020	Ferrari 488 Pista; Ferrari 488 Pista Spider	530 kW; 710 hp (720 PS) at 8000 rpm	770 N⋅m (568 lbf⋅ft) at 3000 rpm
F154 CG	3,902 cc (238 cu in); 86.5 x 83 mm 487.75 cc (30 cu in) per cylinder	2019–2023	Ferrari F8 Tributo; Ferrari F8 Spider	530 kW; 710 hp (720 PS) at 8000 rpm	770 N⋅m (568 lbf⋅ft) at 3250 rpm
F154 FA	3,989.87 cc (243 cu in); 88 x 82 mm 498.7 cc (30 cu in) per cylinder	2020–present	Ferrari SF90 Stradale; Ferrari SF90 Spider	570 kW; 770 hp (780 PS) at 7500 rpm + 160 kW; 220 hp (220 PS) from electric motors = total 740 kW; 990 hp (1,000 PS)	800 N⋅m (590 lbf⋅ft) at 6000 rpm
F154 FB	3,989.87 cc (243 cu in); 88 x 82 mm 498.7 cc (30 cu in) per cylinder	2023–present	Ferrari SF90 XX Stradale; Ferrari SF90 XX Spider	586 kW; 786 hp (797 PS) at 7900 rpm + 171 kW; 230 hp (233 PS) from electric motors = total 760 kW; 1,020 hp (1,030 PS)	804 N⋅m (593 lbf⋅ft) at 6000 rpm
F154 FC	3,989.87 cc (243 cu in); 88 x 82 mm 498.7 cc (30 cu in) per cylinder	2026–present	Ferrari 849 Testarossa	610 kW; 820 hp (830 PS) at 7500 rpm + 160 kW; 220 hp (220 PS) from electric motors = total 770 kW; 1,040 hp (1,050 PS)	842 N⋅m (621 lbf⋅ft) at 6500 rpm
F154 CB	3,996 cc (244 cu in); 86.5 x 83 mm 499.5 cc (30 cu in) per cylinder	2016–2023	Ferrari 488 GTE; Ferrari 488 GTE Evo	490 kW; 660 hp (670 PS) at 5500 rpm	650 N⋅m (479 lbf⋅ft) at 5250 rpm

F154 BD at the Museo Casa Enzo Ferrari

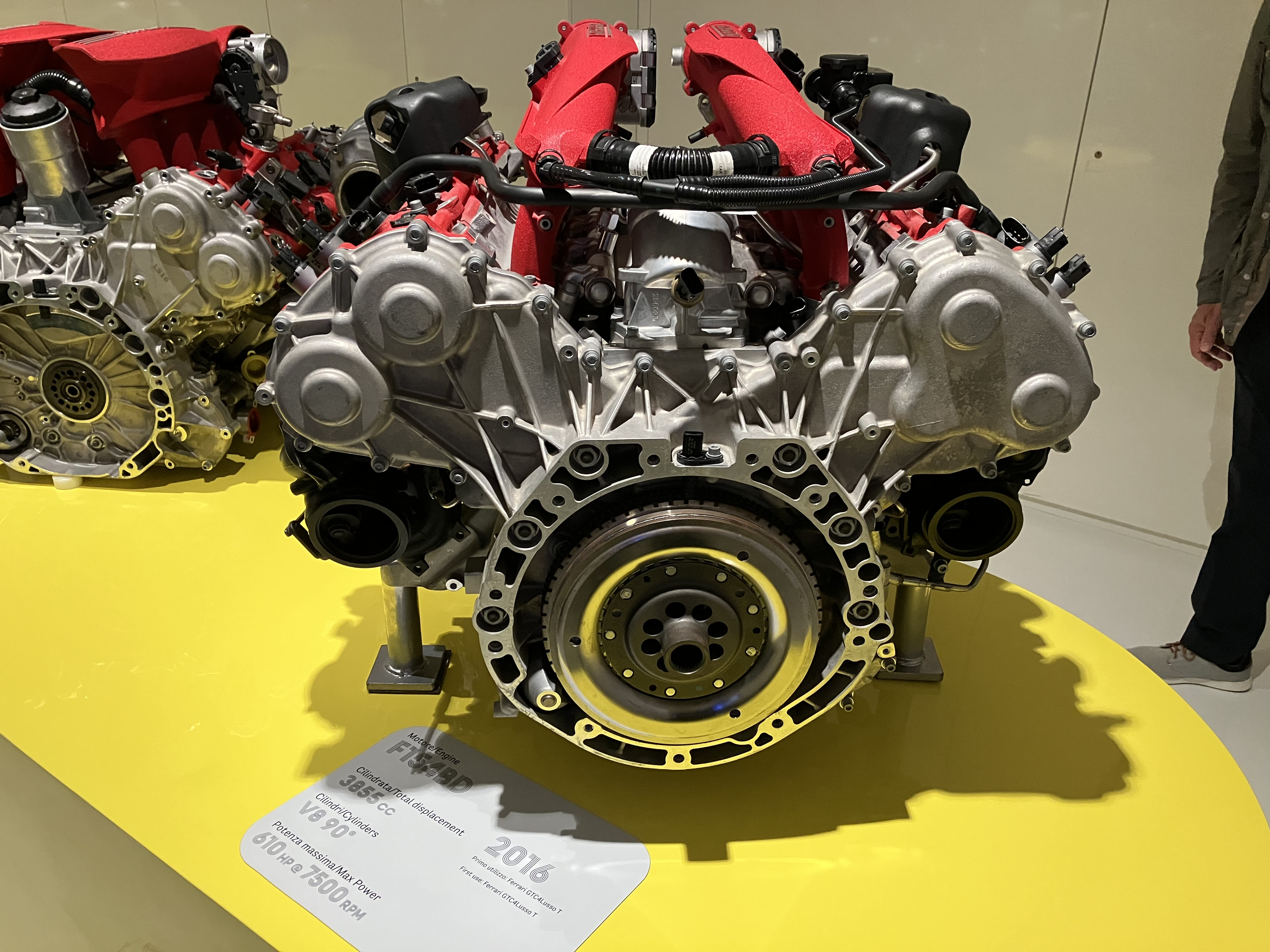

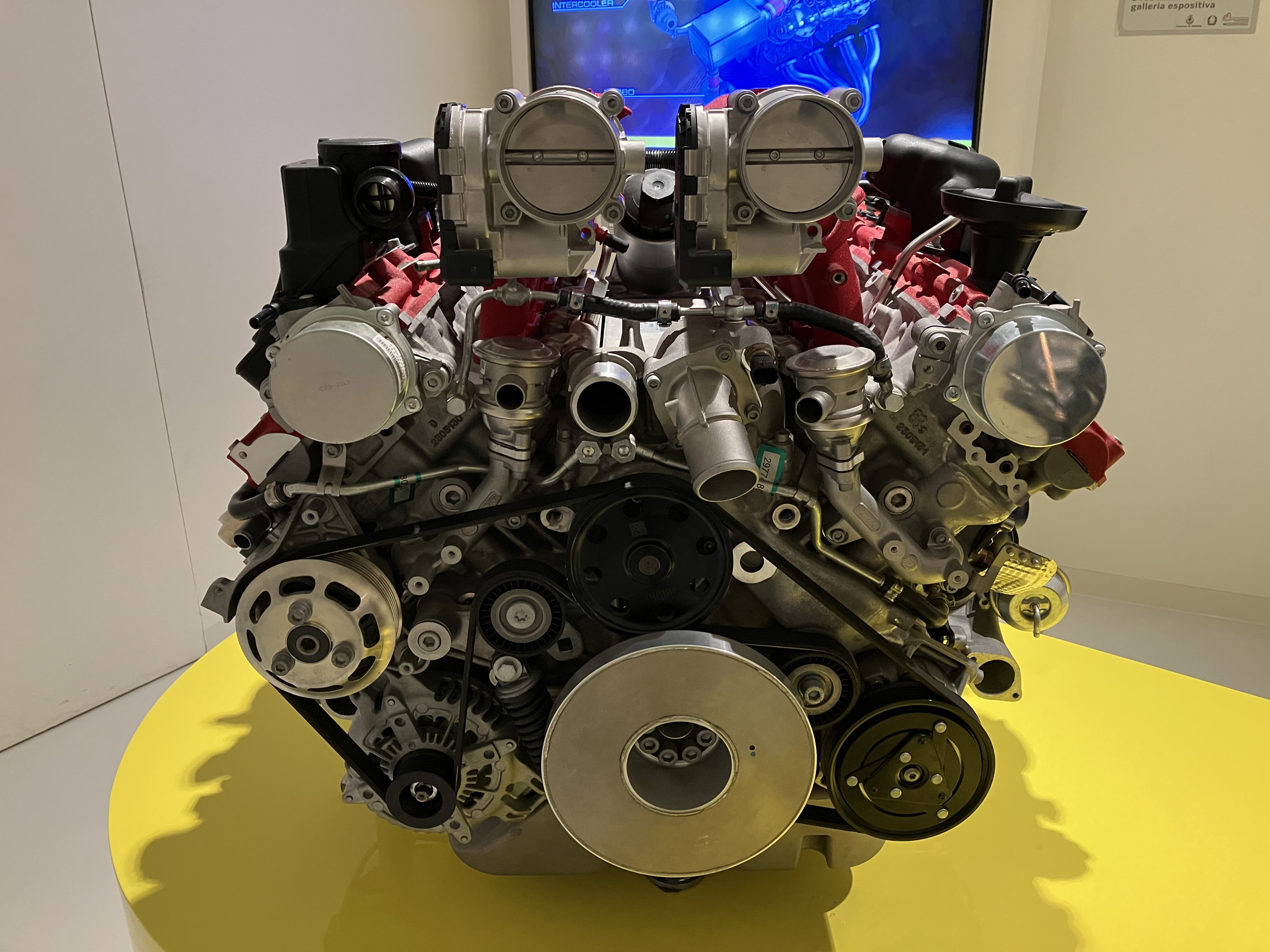
F154 CB at the Museo Casa Enzo Ferrari

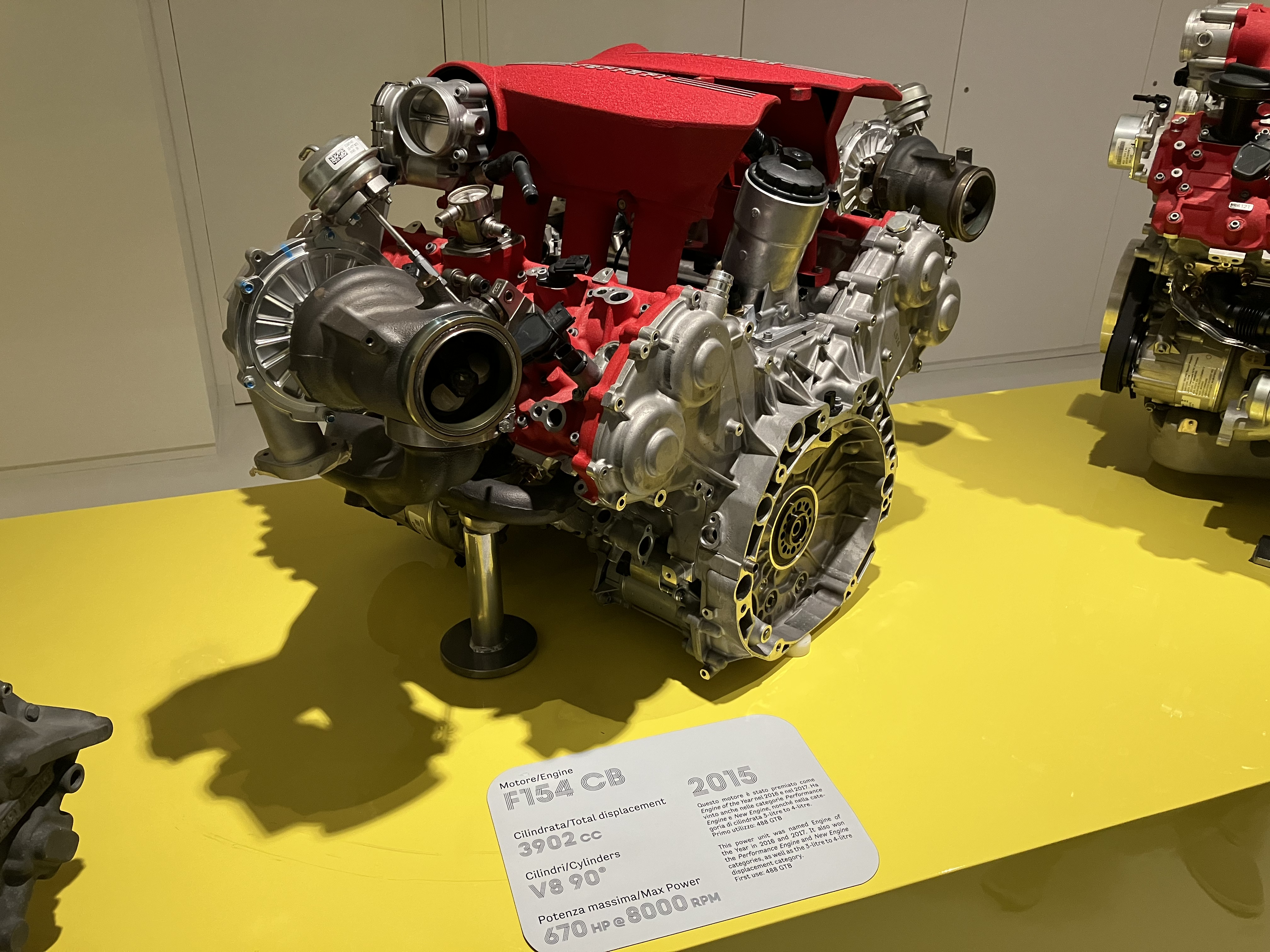

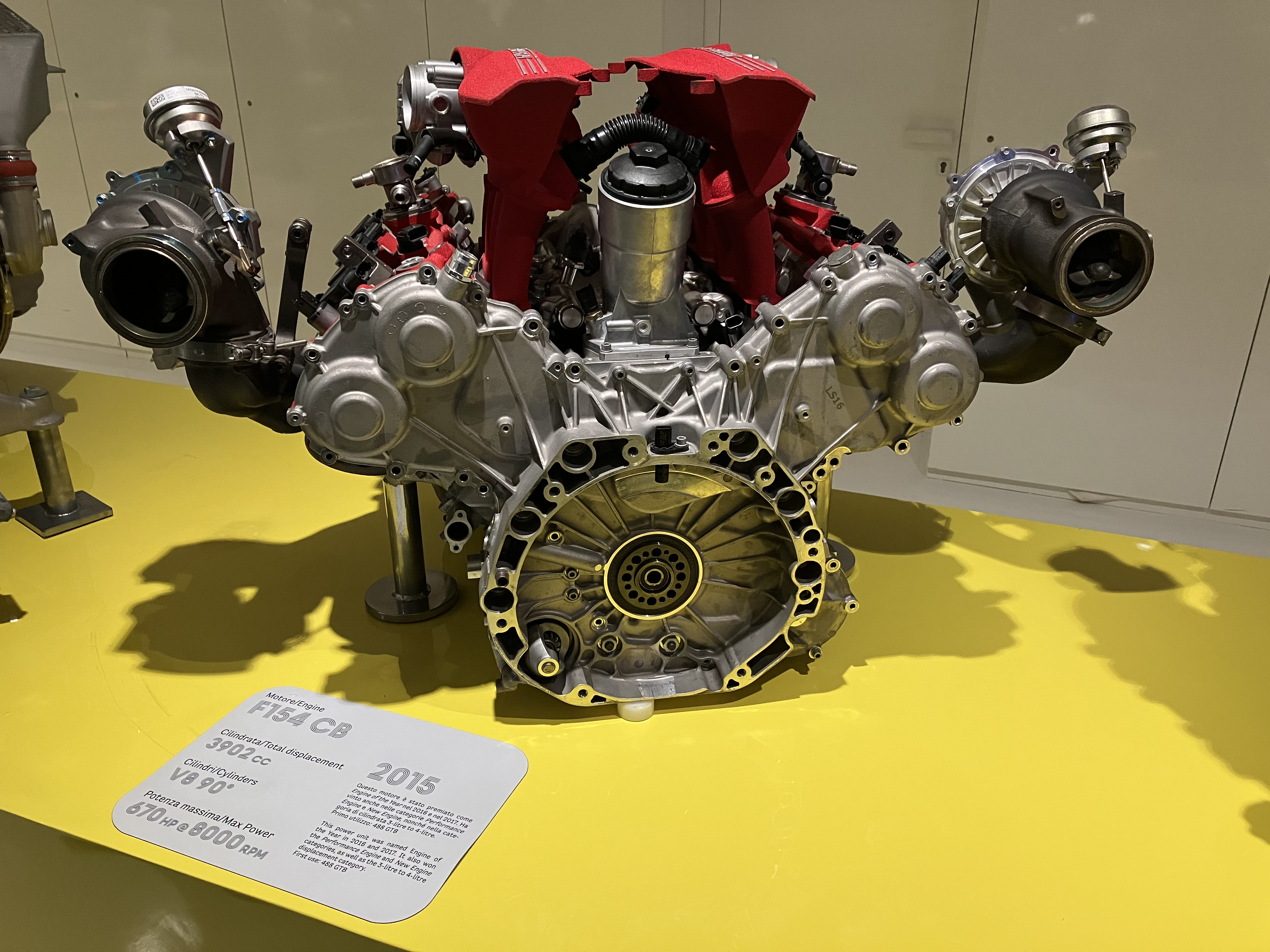

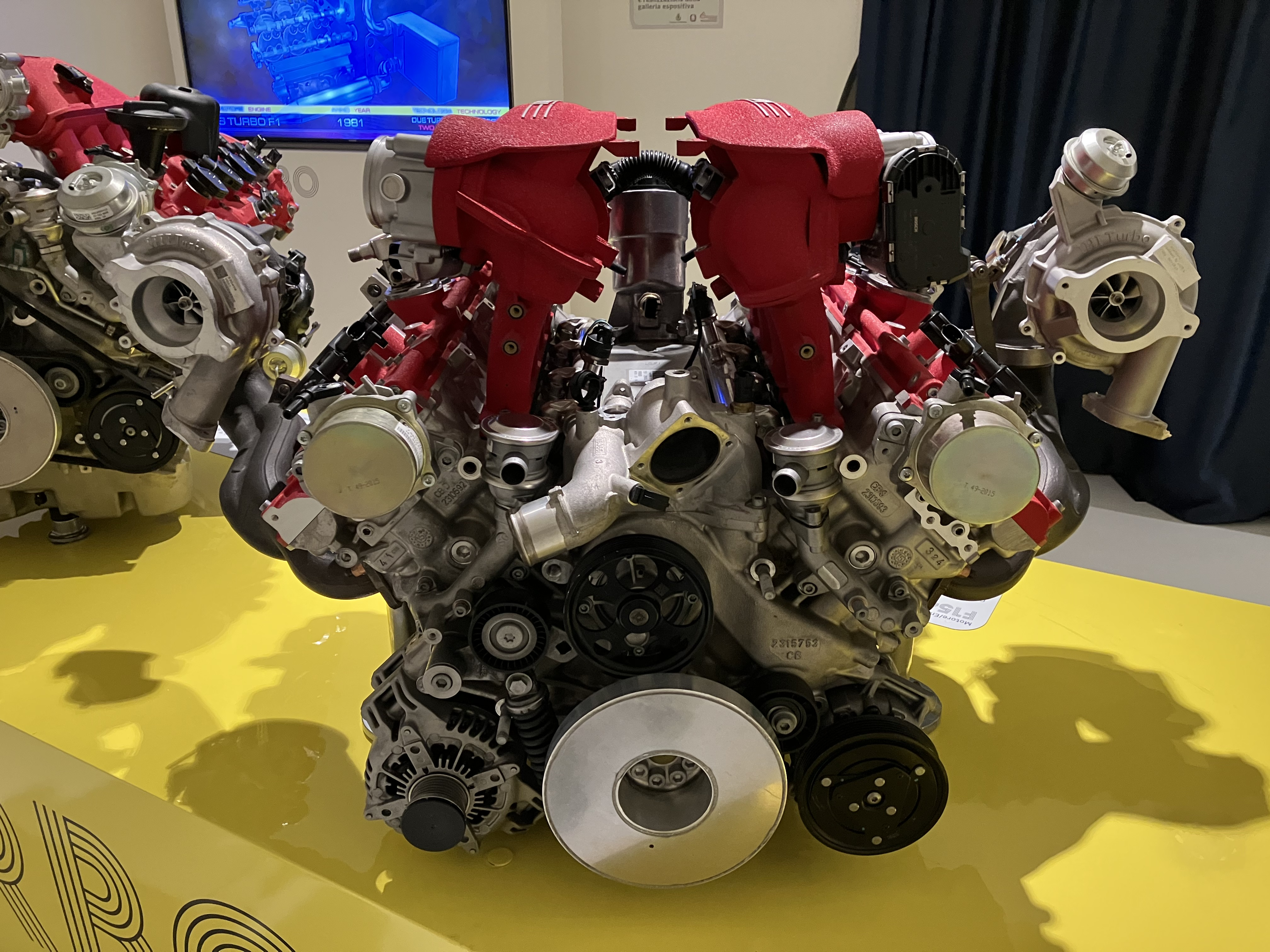

=== Maserati ===
Eng. code	Displacement Bore x stroke	Years	Usage	Peak power	Peak torque
F154 AM	3,798.6 cc (232 cu in); 86.5 x 80.8 mm 474.825 cc (29 cu in) per cylinder	2013–2020	Maserati Quattroporte GTS	390 kW; 520 hp (530 PS) at 6800 rpm	650 N⋅m (479 lbf⋅ft) from 2000 to 4000 rpm 710 N⋅m (524 lbf⋅ft) on overboost between 2250 and 3500 rpm
	3,798.6 cc (232 cu in); 86.5 x 80.8 mm 474.825 cc (29 cu in) per cylinder	2020–2023	Maserati Quattroporte Trofeo	430 kW; 570 hp (580 PS) at 6250 rpm	730 N⋅m (538 lbf⋅ft) between 2250 and 5000 rpm
	3,798.6 cc (232 cu in); 86.5 x 80.8 mm 474.825 cc (29 cu in) per cylinder	2020–2023	Maserati Ghibli Trofeo	430 kW; 570 hp (580 PS) at 6250 rpm	730 N⋅m (538 lbf⋅ft) between 2250 and 5000 rpm
	3,798.6 cc (232 cu in); 86.5 x 80.8 mm 474.825 cc (29 cu in) per cylinder	2018–2024	Maserati Levante GTS (US spec)	410 kW; 550 hp (558 PS) at 6250 rpm	730 N⋅m (538 lbf⋅ft) between 2250 and 5000 rpm
F154 AS	3,798.6 cc (232 cu in); 86.5 x 80.8 mm 474.825 cc (29 cu in) per cylinder	2018–2024	Maserati Levante GTS (Euro spec)	390 kW; 520 hp (530 PS) at 6250 rpm	730 N⋅m (538 lbf⋅ft) between 2250 and 5000 rpm
	3,798.6 cc (232 cu in); 86.5 x 80.8 mm 474.825 cc (29 cu in) per cylinder	2018–2024	Maserati Levante Trofeo (US spec)	440 kW; 590 hp (598 PS) at 6250 rpm	730 N⋅m (538 lbf⋅ft) between 2250 and 5000 rpm
F154 AQ	3,798.6 cc (232 cu in); 86.5 x 80.8 mm 474.825 cc (29 cu in) per cylinder	2018–2024	Maserati Levante Trofeo (Euro spec)	430 kW; 570 hp (580 PS) at 6750 rpm	730 N⋅m (538 lbf⋅ft) between 2250 and 5000 rpm

Detailed views of a Maserati F154 engine at the Maserati Modena showroom

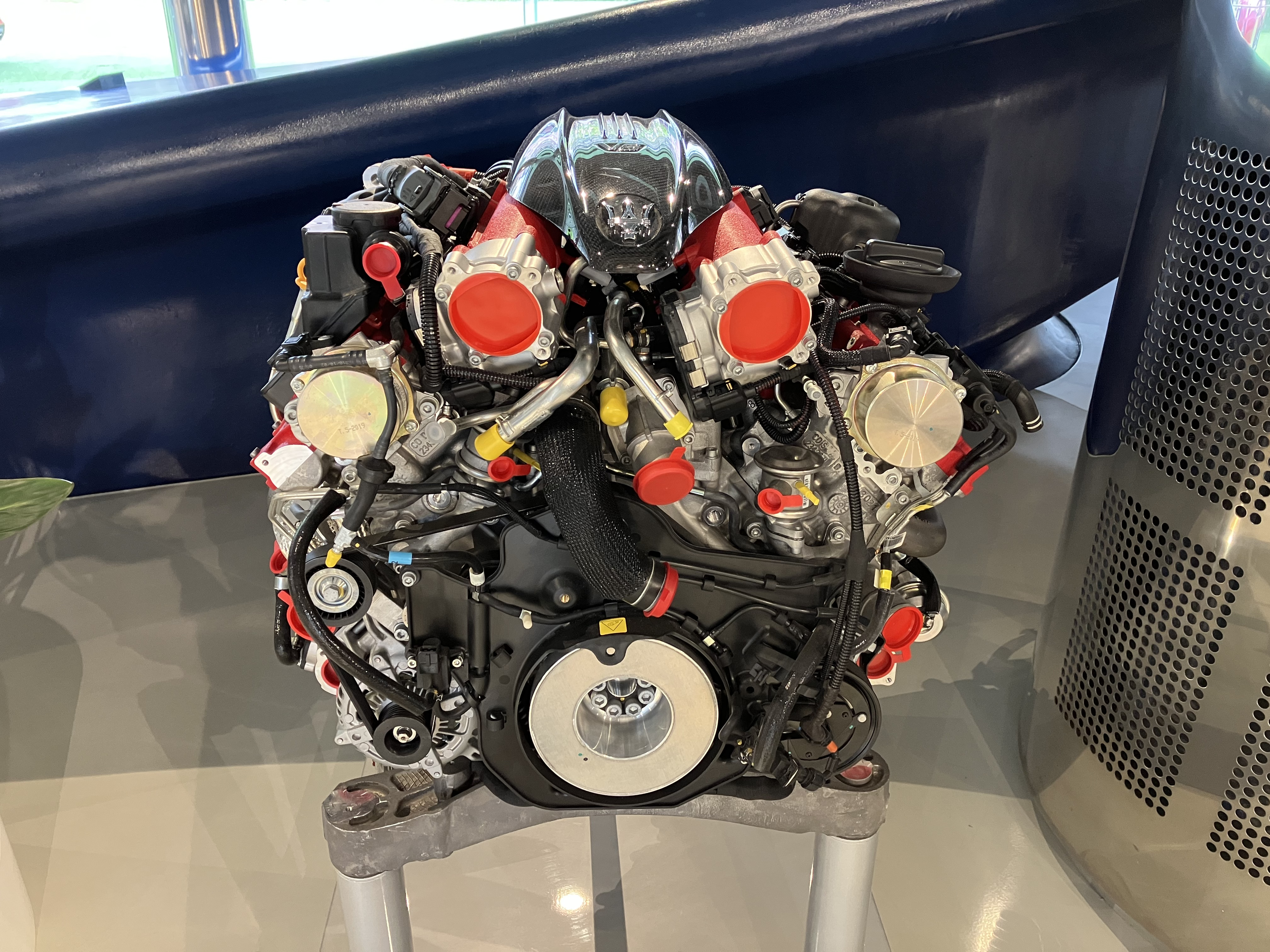

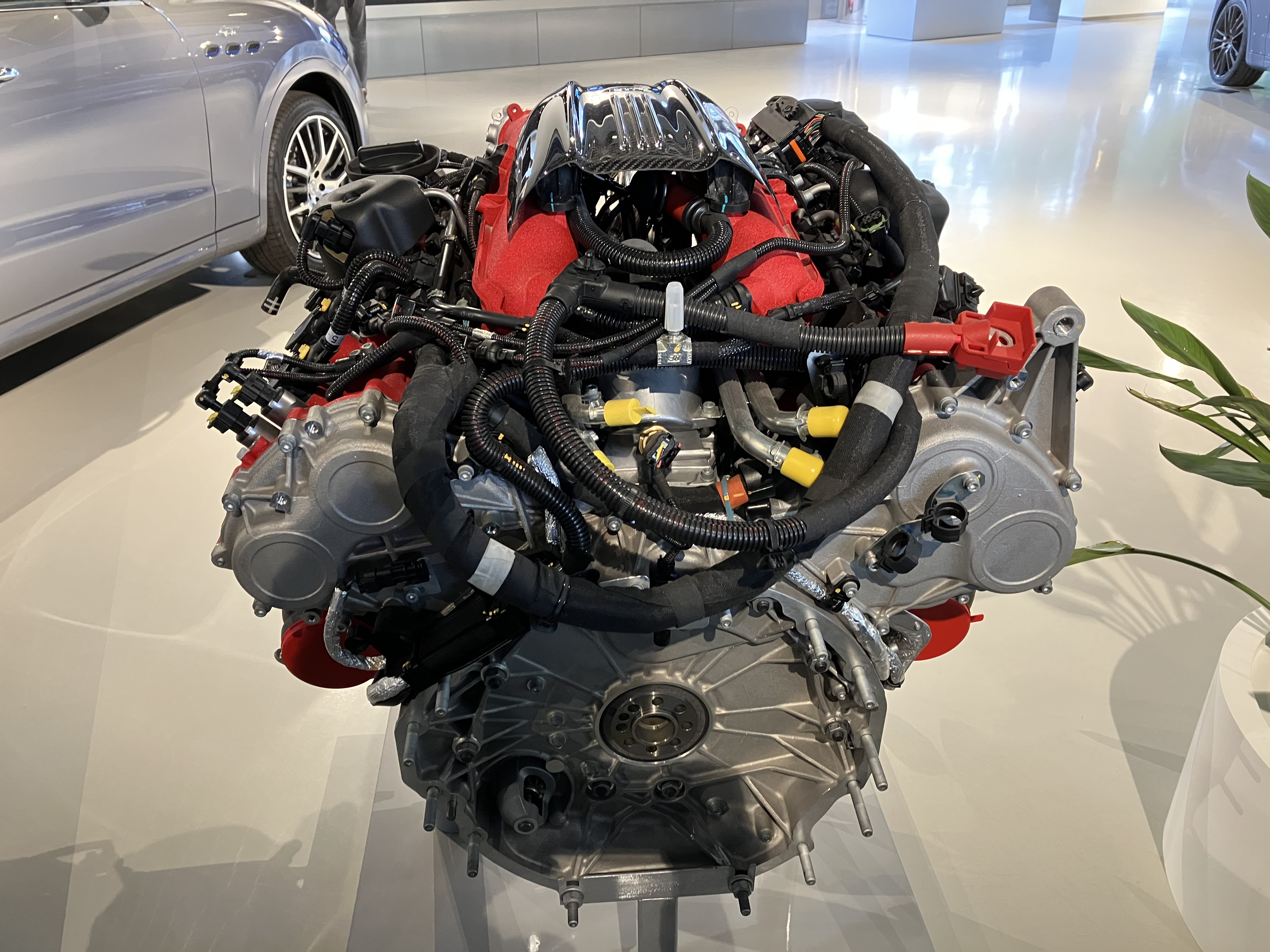

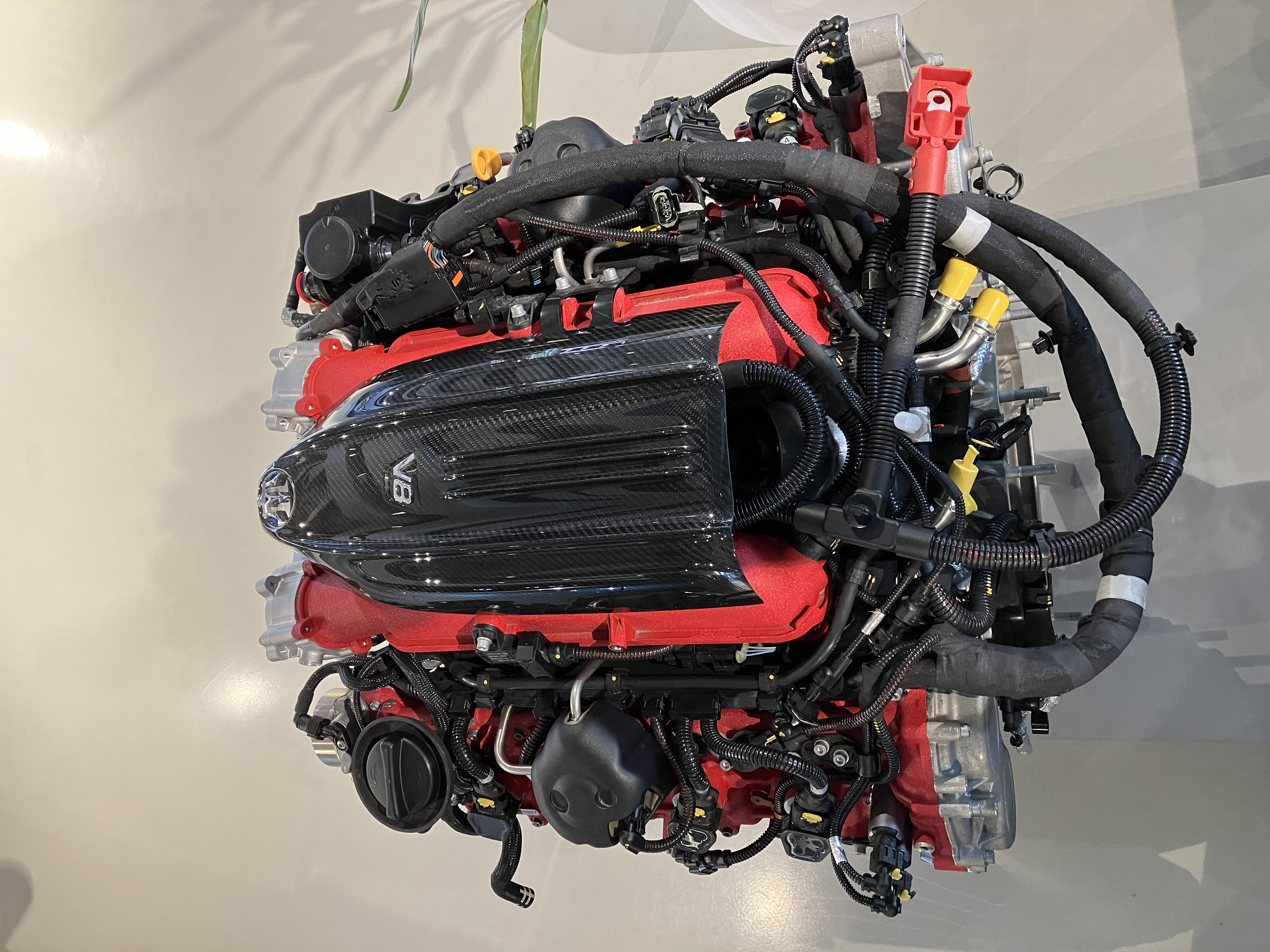

== Awards ==
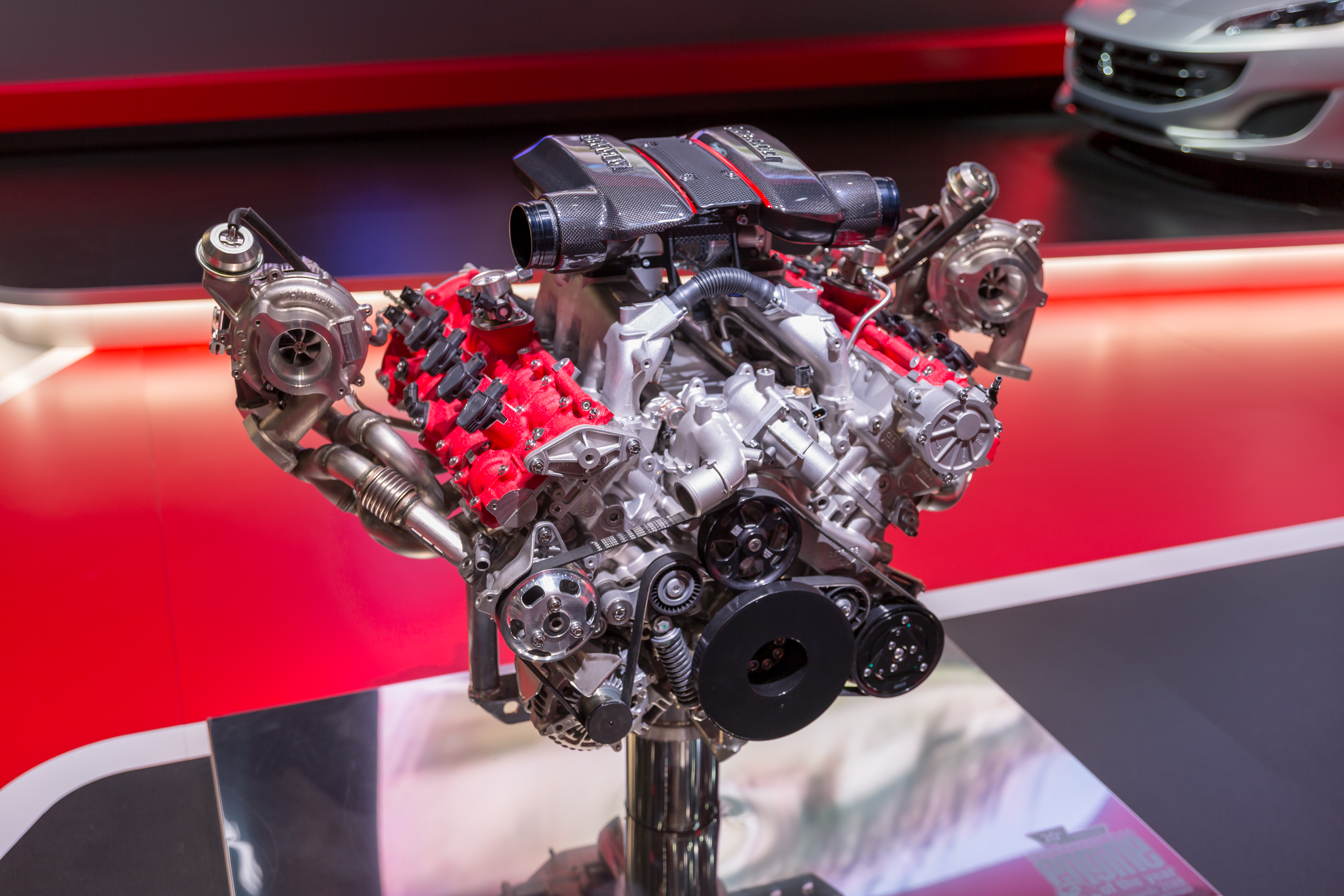
F154 CD

The F154B and F154C engines have won a total of 14 awards in the International Engine of the Year competition, including a record of four consecutive overall titles between 2016 and 2019 and additional four Best Performance Engine titles. The powerplant also won the 2016 Best New Engine recognition at his debut. Between 2016 and 2018 the engine was classified at the first place in the 3-to-4 litre class. Following the adoption of new power-based categories instead of the previous ones based on displacement, in 2019 the F154 variants won both 550 to 650 PS and Above 650 PS awards.

In 2018 the F154C engine was crowned by Johannes as the most significant engine since the launch of the International Engine of the Year in 1999.

== See also ==
- List of Ferrari engines
