= Alfa Romeo 33 Stradale (2023) =

Gas-powered or all-electric sports car

Overview
- Manufacturer: Alfa Romeo
- Production: December 2024–present
- Assembly: Italy: Milan (Carrozzeria Touring Superleggera)
- Designer: César Barreau at Centro Stile Alfa Romeo under Alejandro Mesonero-Romanos

Body and chassis
- Class: Sports car (S)
- Body style: 2-door coupé
- Layout: Rear mid-engine, rear-wheel-drive
- Doors: Butterfly
- Related: Maserati MC20

Powertrain
- Engine: 3.0 L 690T twin-turbo V6
- Electric motor: 3× permanent magnet synchronous
- Power output: 463 kW (621 hp) (gas version); 559 kW (750 hp) (WLTP, EV version)
- Transmission: 8-speed ZF dual-clutch

Dimensions
- Wheelbase: 2,700 mm (106.3 in)
- Length: 4,637 mm (182.6 in)
- Width: 1,966 mm (77.4 in)
- Height: 1,226 mm (48.3 in)
- Kerb weight: 1,500–2,100 kg (3,307–4,630 lb)

Chronology
- Predecessor: Alfa Romeo 33 Stradale (spiritual)

The Alfa Romeo 33 Stradale is a sports car produced by Italian automobile manufacturer Alfa Romeo. Unveiled on August 30, 2023, the car was available with two powertrain options, either a 3.0-litre twin-turbocharged V6 engine or an all-electric powertrain.

== History ==
Rear view

The project began development in June 2022 at the initiative of Jean-Philippe Imparato, head of Alfa Romeo, taking some of its development work from an abandoned Alfa Romeo project that was used to develop the Maserati MC20. The car is meant to be an homage to the original 1967 model, with a limited production run of 33 units. The cars were produced by the Italian coach building firm Touring Superleggera.

== Specifications ==
The 33 Stradale was offered with a choice of the 3.0-litre twin-turbocharged V6 engine from the Maserati MC20, or an all-electric powertrain. The V6 is paired with the 8-speed dual clutch transmission from the MC20, which sends power to the rear wheels through an electronic limited-slip differential. The 33 Stradale features a modified version of the MC20's carbon fiber monocoque, with aluminum subframes, dual-arm suspension, active shock absorbers, and semi-virtual steering on both axles. Braking is handled by a brake-by-wire system using Brembo carbon-ceramic brakes. Alfa Romeo claims a 0–100 km/h (62 mph) time of under 3.0 seconds for both powertrain options, and a top speed of 207 mph (333 km/h). The electric variant has a claimed range of 240 mi (386 km).
