= M139 =

M139 could refer to:

- M-139 (Michigan highway)
- Mercedes-Benz M139 engine
- the US Army model number for the Hispano-Suiza HS.820 20 mm autocannon
- the Maserati M139 platform, a front mid-engine, rear-wheel-drive automobile platform
- M139 bomblet, a chemical cluster bomb for launch on a ground-to-ground rocket
