= Maserati GranTurismo =

Series of grand tourer cars

Maserati GranTurismo Maserati GranCabrio
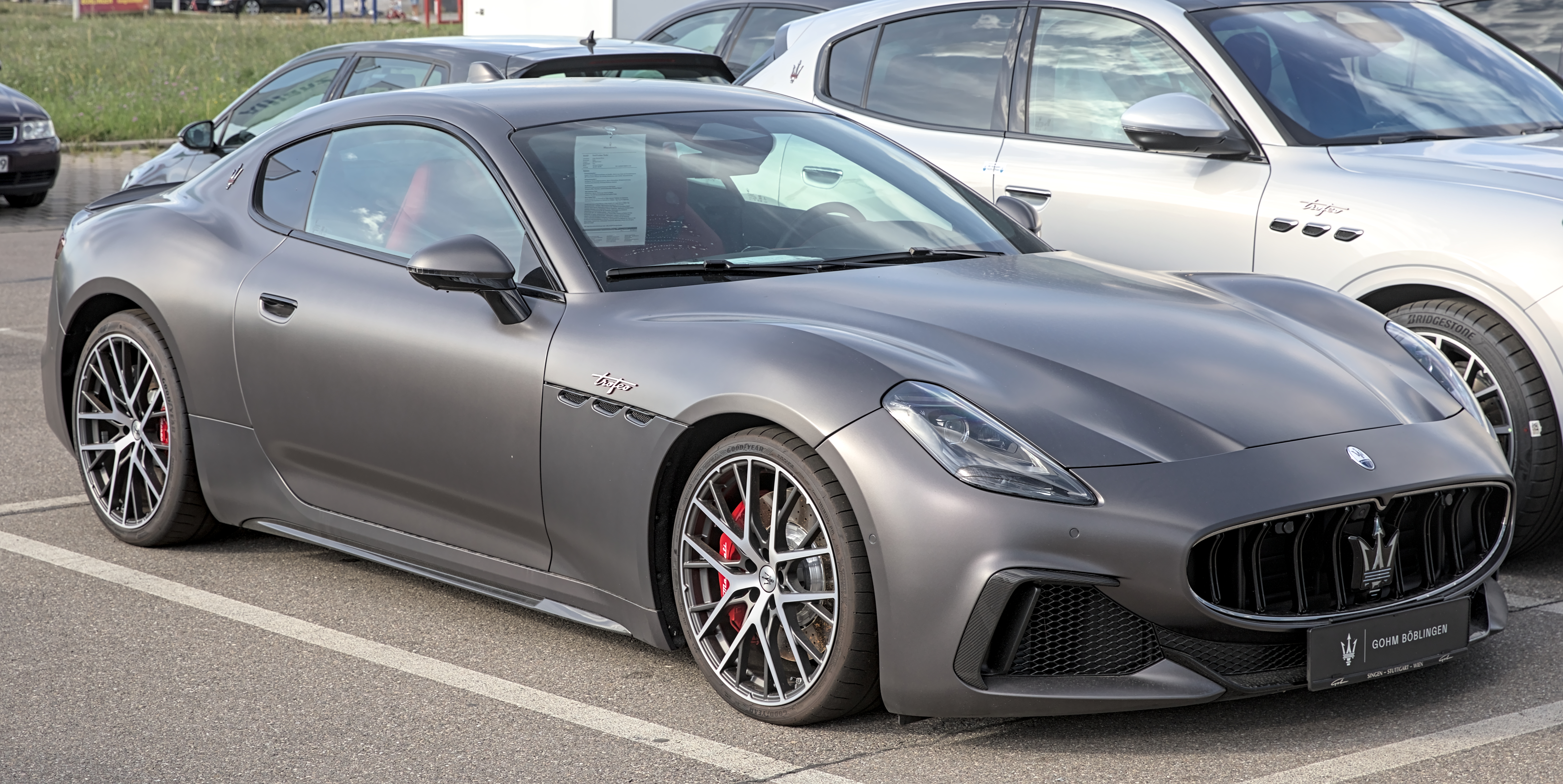

Overview
- Manufacturer: Maserati
- Production: 2007 – December 2019 (40,520 produced); April 2023 – present
- Model years: 2008–2019; 2023–present

Body and chassis
- Class: Grand tourer (S)
- Body style: 2-door 2+2 coupé; 2-door 2+2 convertible

Chronology
- Predecessor: Maserati Coupé and Spyder

The Maserati GranTurismo and GranCabrio are a series of grand tourers produced by the Italian manufacturer Maserati, succeeding the Maserati Coupé and Spyder.

The first generation GranTurismo (M145) was introduced at the 2007 Geneva Motor Show and was produced from 2007 to December 2019. It set a record for the fastest development of a car, going from design to production in just nine months. The model featured a 4.2-litre V8 engine initially, which was later upgraded to a 4.7-liter engine in the GranTurismo S variant. The GranTurismo MC, a racing version developed for the FIA GT4 European Cup, and the GranTurismo MC Sport Line, a customisation programme, were also part of the lineup.

The GranTurismo Sport, introduced in 2012, replaced the GranTurismo S and featured a revised 4.7-litre engine. The GranTurismo MC Stradale, unveiled in 2010, is a more track-focused version inspired by a race variant. The GranCabrio convertible version was unveiled at the 2009 Frankfurt Motor Show and produced from 2010 to 2019. The GranCabrio Sport was introduced in 2011 and the GranCabrio MC was launched in 2013, the latter featuring improved aerodynamics and a light bump in power.

The second generation, GranTurismo II (M189), was revealed in 2022 and began production in April 2023. It offers three models: Modena, Trofeo, and Folgore (electric). Based on the Giorgio Sport platform, petrol engined models feature a newly-developed 3.0-litre Nettuno twin-turbocharged V6 engine, with the Trofeo variant being the most powerful at 405 kW (550 PS). The Folgore model is a battery electric version with a range of 450 km (279.6 mi).

== GranTurismo I (M145, 2007–2019) ==
First generation (M145)
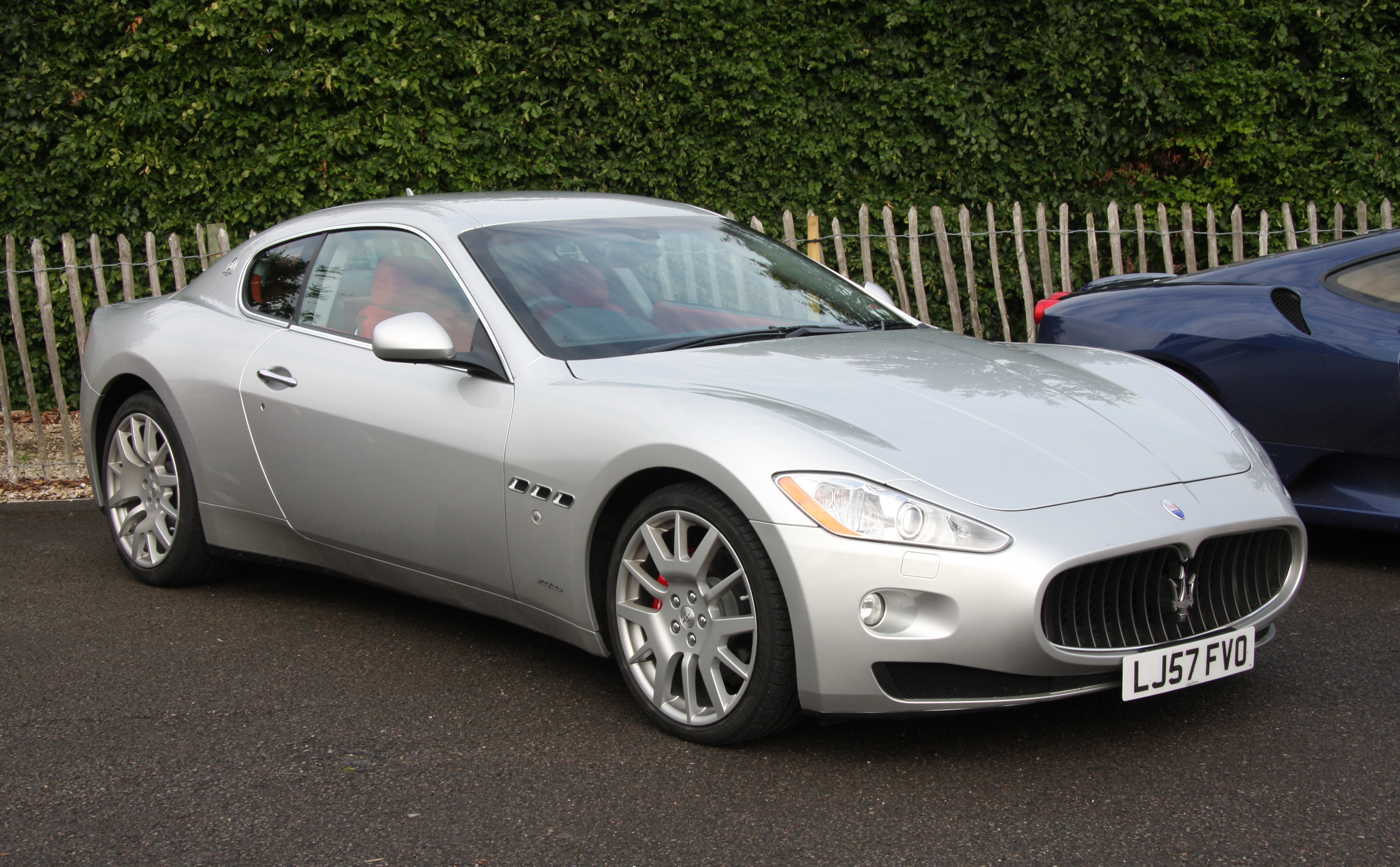

Overview
- Manufacturer: Maserati (Note: Fiat S.p.A. (2007–2014); FCA (2014–2019))
- Production: 2007 – December 2019 (40,520 units): 28,805 units (coupé); 11,715 units (convertible)
- Model years: 2008–2019
- Assembly: Italy: Modena
- Designer: Pininfarina: Jason Castriota; Lowie Vermeersch (GranCabrio)

Body and chassis
- Layout: Front-mid-engine, rear-wheel-drive
- Platform: Maserati M139
- Related: Maserati Quattroporte V; Alfa Romeo 8C Competizione; Alfa Romeo Pandion; Maserati Alfieri concept

Powertrain
- Engine: 4.2 L Ferrari-Maserati F136 U V8; 4.7 L Ferrari-Maserati F136 Y V8
- Transmission: 6-speed ZF 6HP26 automatic; 6-speed Graziano MC-Shift automated manual

Dimensions
- Wheelbase: 2,942 mm (115.8 in)
- Length: 4,881 mm (192.2 in)
- Width: 1,847 mm (72.7 in); 1,915 mm (75 in) (from 2012)
- Height: 1,353 mm (53.3 in)
- Curb weight: 1,880 kg (4,140 lb) (European version)

The first generation of Maserati GranTurismo (Tipo M145) was unveiled at the 2007 Geneva Motor Show, and was built between 2007 and December 2019. The GranTurismo set a record for the most quickly developed car in the auto industry, going from design to production stage in just nine months. The reason being that the proposed replacement for the Maserati Coupé looked like it was going to be too expensive to manufacture by Maserati, and FIAT Chrysler Automobiles' Ferrari division needed a small car in its range and so it was launched as the Ferrari California instead, leaving Maserati without a coupe. A total of 28,805 GranTurismo coupes were produced.

=== GranTurismo (2007–2019) ===
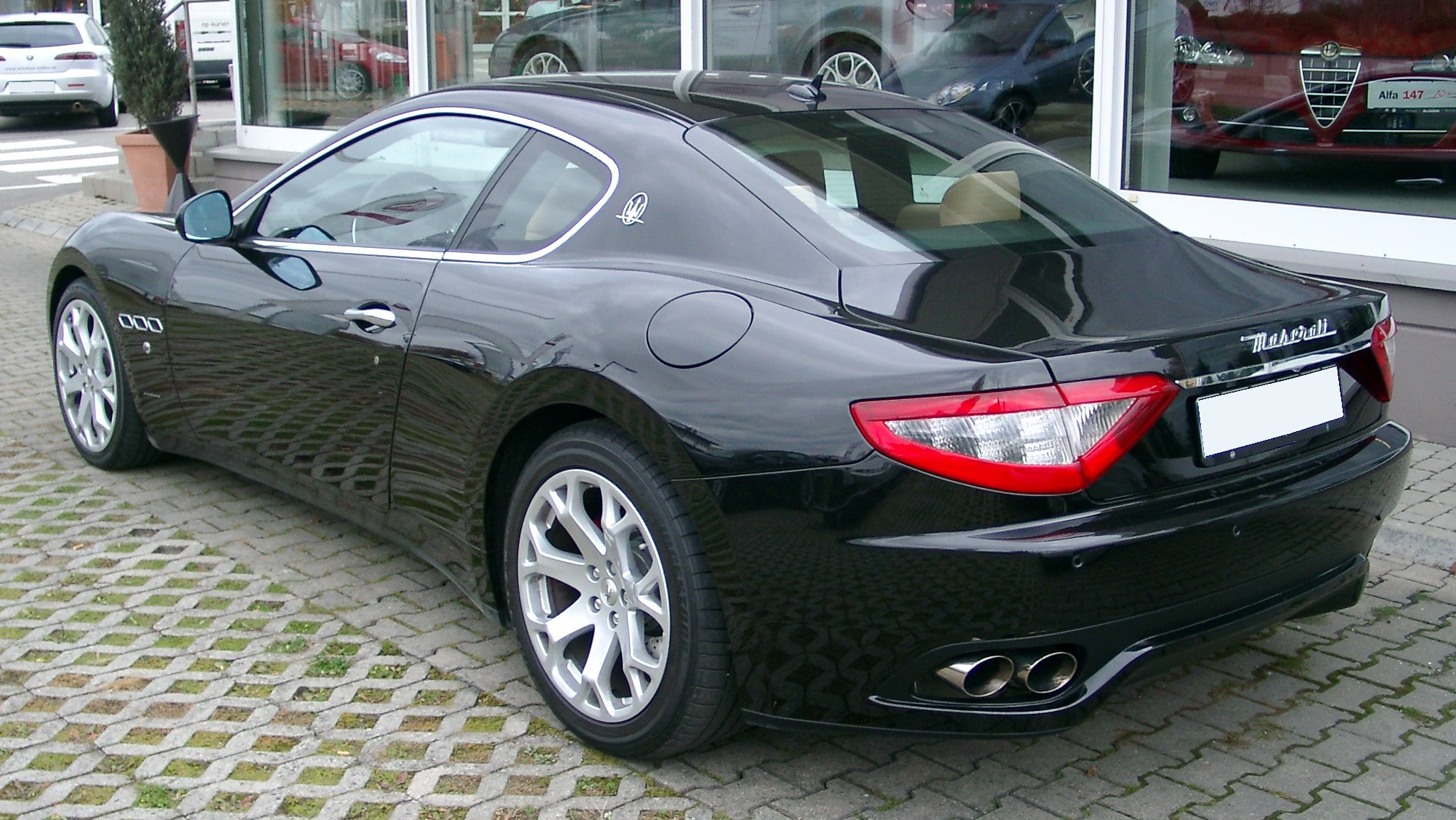
Maserati GranTurismo (rear view)

The model was initially equipped with a 4.2-litre (4,244 cc (259.0 cu in)) V8 engine developed in conjunction with Ferrari. The engine generates a maximum power output of 298 kW (405 PS) and is equipped with a 6-speed ZF automatic transmission. The 2+2 body was derived from the Maserati M139 platform, also shared with the Maserati Quattroporte V, with double wishbone front suspension and a multilink rear suspension. It had a drag coefficient of 0.33.

=== GranTurismo S (2008–2012) ===
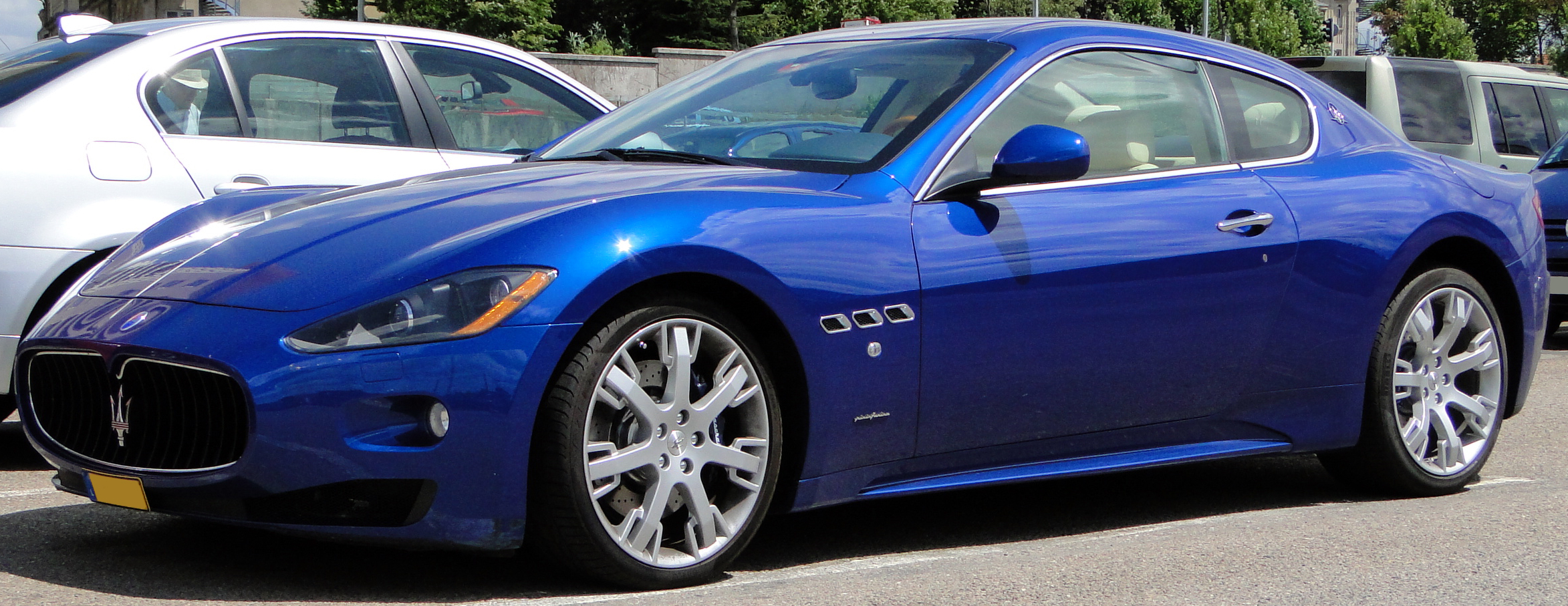
GranTurismo S

The better equipped S variant was unveiled at the 2008 Geneva Motor Show and features the enlarged 4.7-litre (4,691 cc (286.3 cu in) V8 engine shared with the Alfa Romeo 8C Competizione, rated at 324 kW (440 PS) at 7,000 rpm and 490 N⋅m (361 lbf⋅ft) of torque at 4,750 rpm. The engine is mated to the 6-speed automated manual built by Graziano Trasmissioni and shared with the Ferrari F430. With the transaxle layout, weight distribution shifted to 47% front and 53% rear. The standard suspension set-up is fixed-setting steel dampers, with the Skyhook adaptive suspension available as an option along with a new exhaust system, and upgraded Brembo brakes. The seats were also offered with various leather and Alcantara trim options. It had increased performance, with acceleration from 0–100 km/h (0–62 mph) happening in 4.9 seconds and a maximum speed of 295 km/h (183 mph). Aside from the power upgrades, the car featured new side skirts, unique 20-inch wheels unavailable on the standard car, a small boot lip spoiler, and black headlight clusters in place of the original silver. The variant was available in the North American market only for MY2009 with only 300 units offered for sale.

Maserati GranTurismo S exhaust sound

=== GranTurismo MC (2009–2010) ===
The GranTurismo MC is the racing version of the GranTurismo S developed to compete in the FIA GT4 European Cup and is based on the Maserati MC concept. The car included a 6-point racing harness, 120 L (32 US gal; 26 imp gal) fuel tank, 380 mm (15.0 in) front and 326 mm (12.8 in) rear brake discs with 6-piston calipers at the front and 4-piston calipers at the rear, 18-inch racing wheels with 305/645/18 front and 305/680/18 rear tyres, carbon fibre bodywork and lexan windows throughout along with a race interior. All the weight-saving measures lower the weight to about 3,000 lb (1,361 kg). The car shares the 4.7-litre V8 engine from the GranTurismo S but is tuned to generate a maximum power output of 450 PS (331 kW; 444 hp) along with the 6-speed automated manual transmission.

The GranTurismo MC was unveiled at the Paul Ricard Circuit in France. It went on sale in October, 2009 through the Maserati Corse programme. 15 GranTurismo MC racecars were developed, homologated for the European Cup and National Endurance Series, one of which was taken to be raced by GT motorsport organization Cool Victory in Dubai in January, 2010.

=== GranTurismo MC Sport Line (2009–2019) ===
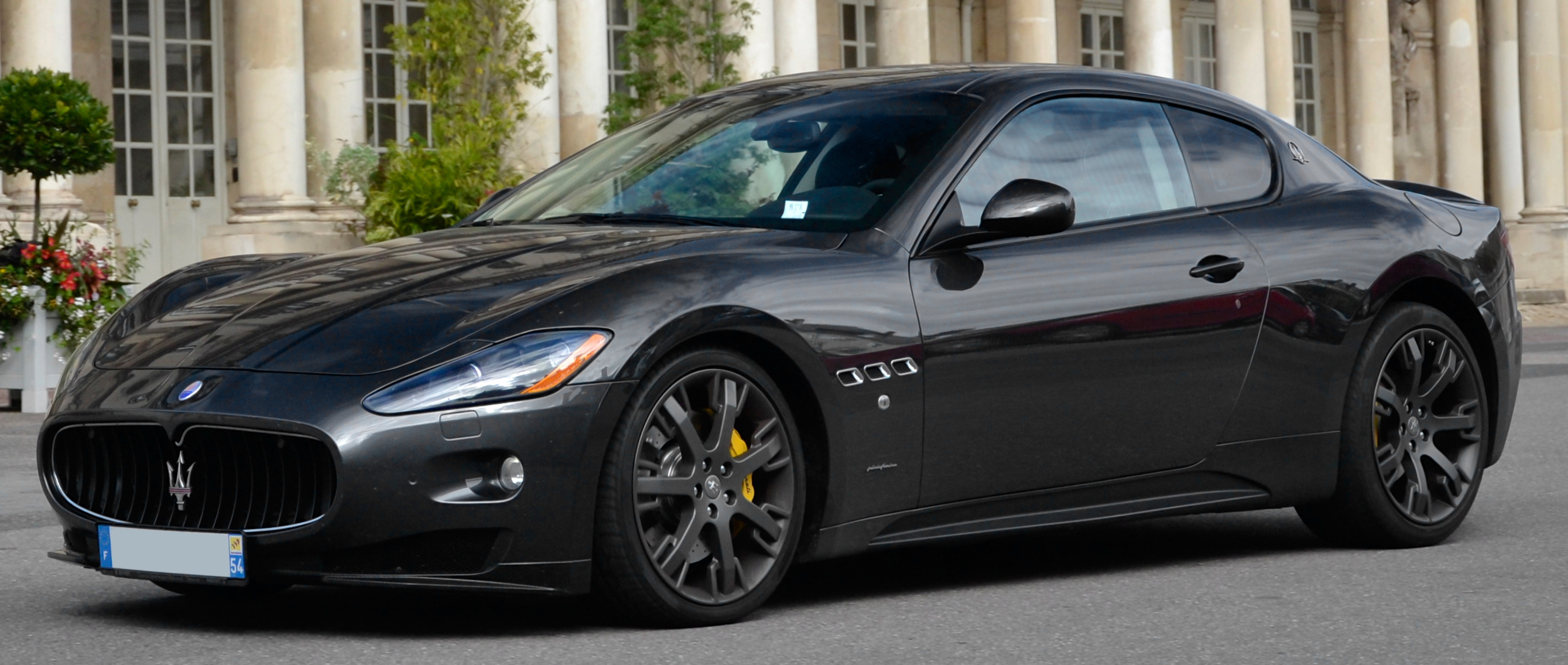
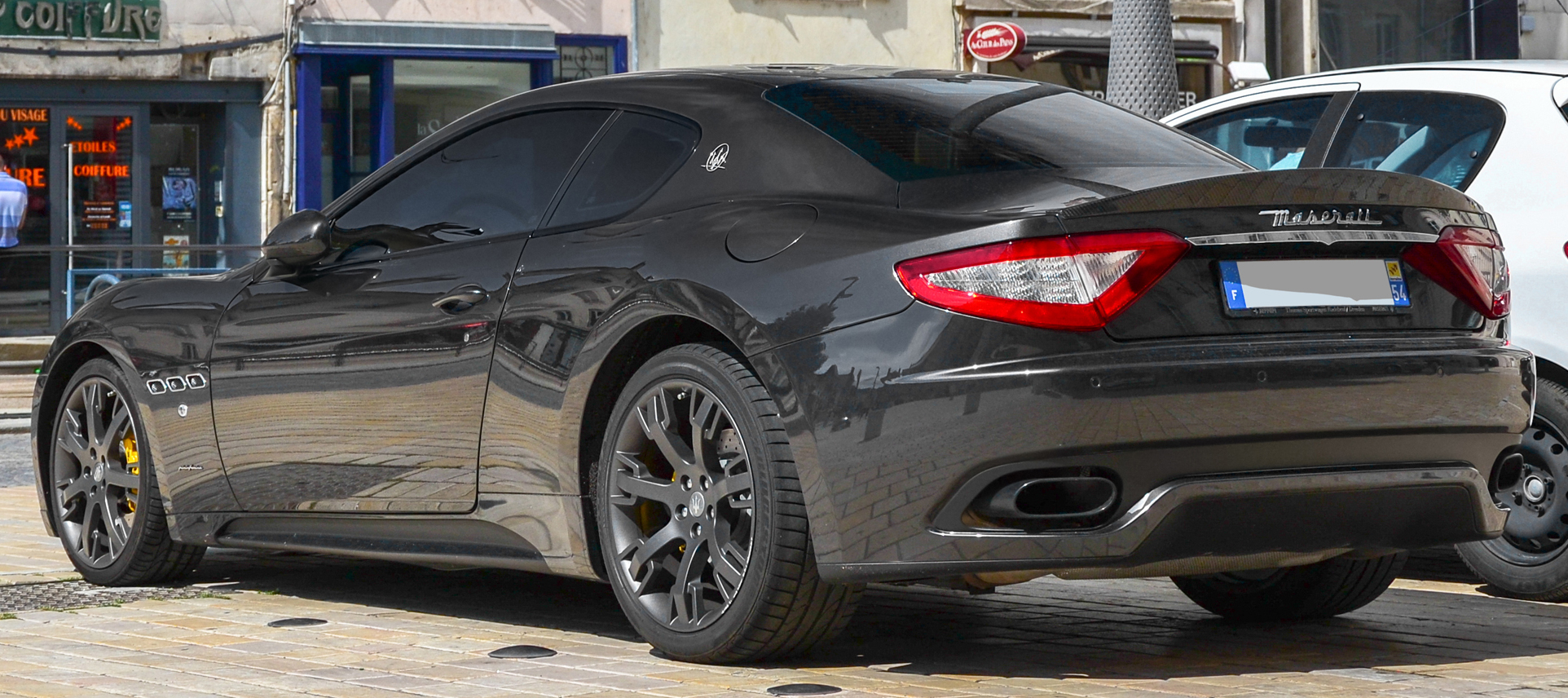
GranTurismo MC Sport Line

Introduced in 2008, the GranTurismo MC Sport Line is a customisation programme based on the GranTurismo MC concept. Changes include front and rear carbon-fibre spoilers, carbon-fibre mirror housings and door handles, 20-inch wheels, carbon-fibre interior (steering wheel rim, paddle shifters, instrument panel, dashboard, door panels), stiffer springs, shock absorbers and anti-roll bars with custom Maserati Stability Programme software and 10 mm (0.4 in) lower height than GranTurismo S. The programme was initially offered for the GranTurismo S only, with the product line expanded to all GranTurismo variants and eventually all Maserati vehicles in 2009.

=== GranTurismo MC Stradale (2011–2015) ===
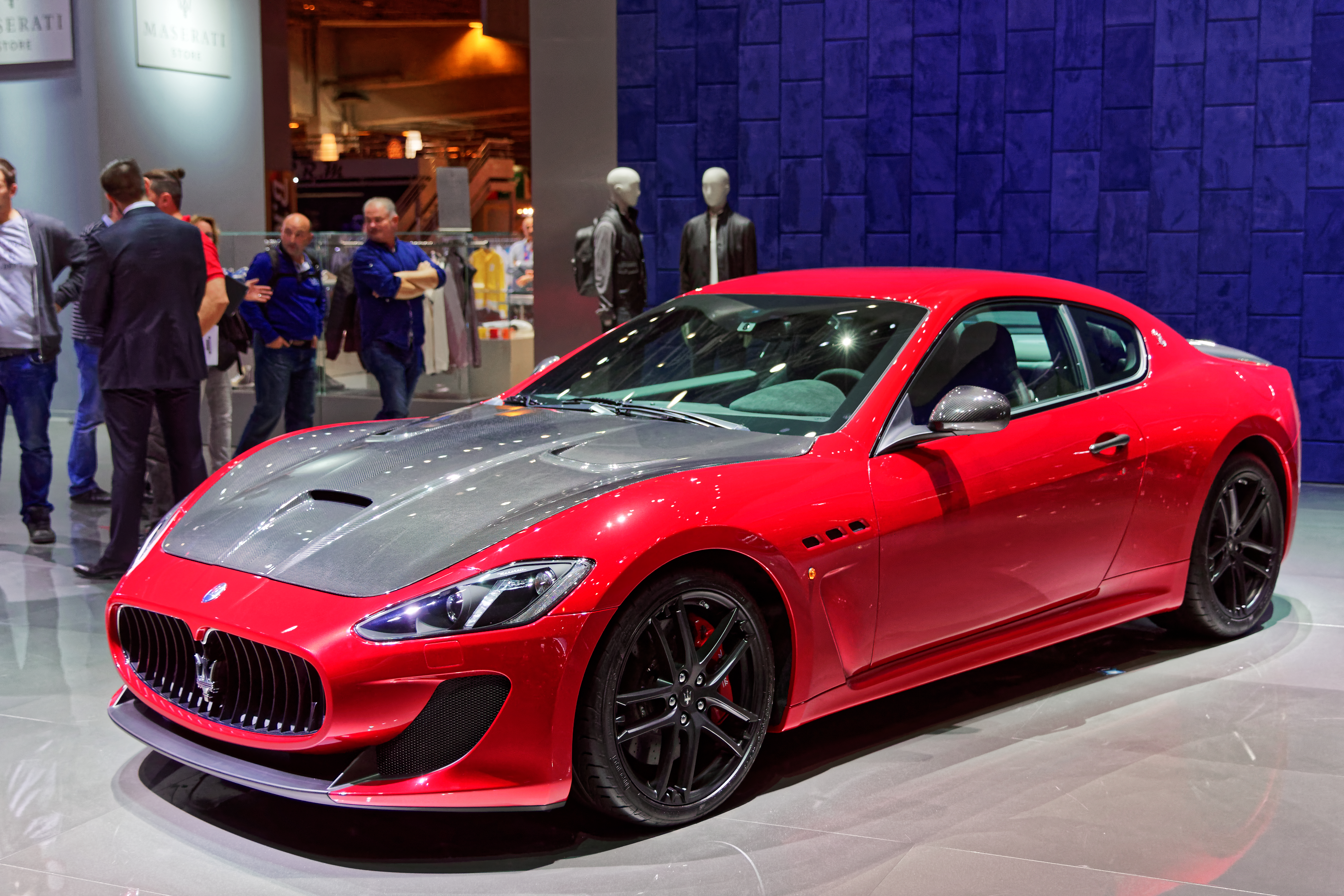
Maserati GranTurismo MC Stradale (with optional carbon fibre hood)

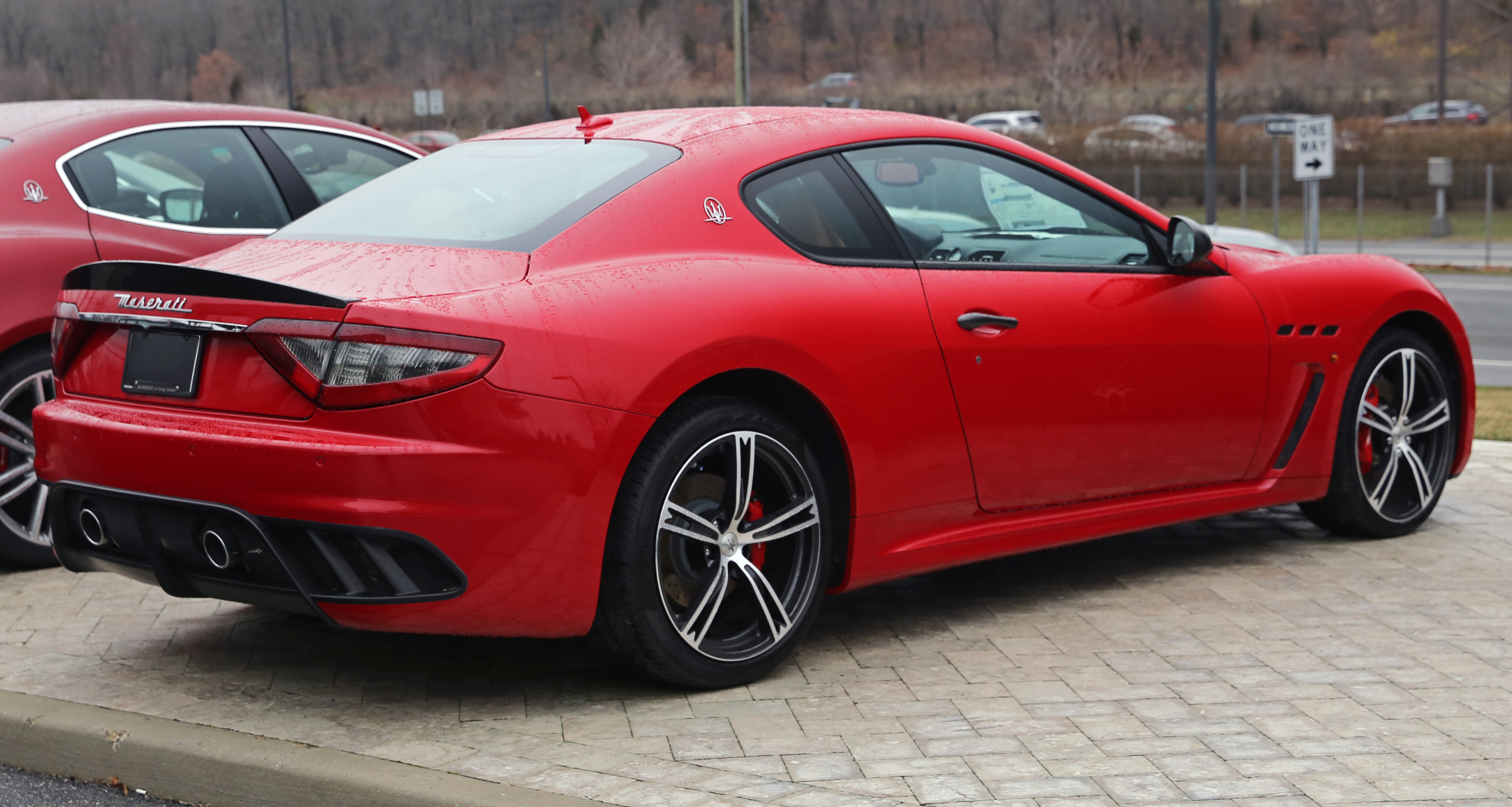
Rear view

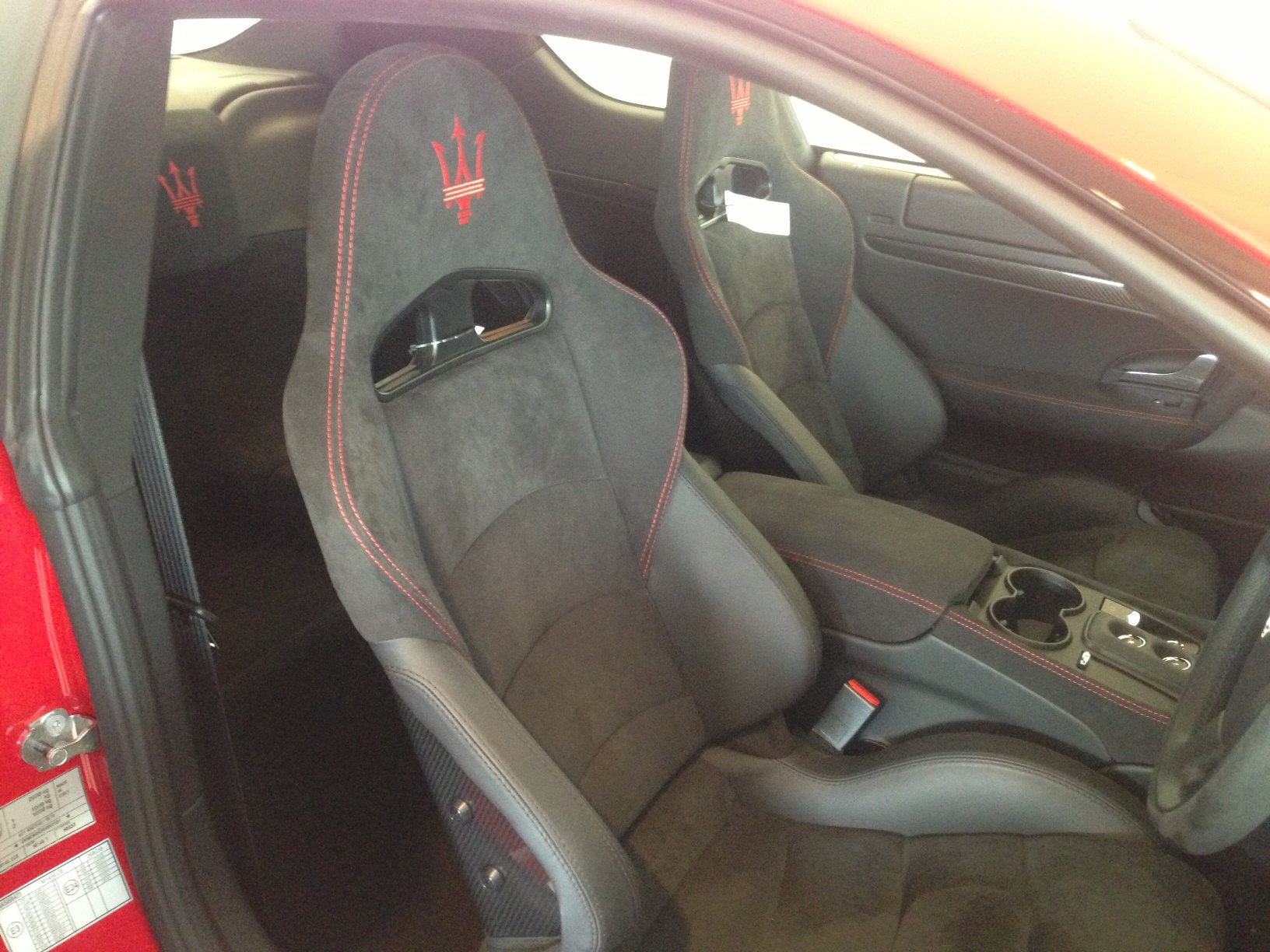
Carbon fibre seats of the MC Stradale

In September 2010, Maserati announced plans to unveil a new version of the GranTurismo - the MC Stradale - at the 2010 Paris Motor Show. The strictly two-seat MC Stradale is more powerful than the GranTurismo at 331 kW (450 PS), friction reduction accounts for the increase, says Maserati, due to the strategic use of “diamond-like coating", an antifriction technology derived from Formula 1, on wear parts such as the cams and followers. It is also 110 kg lighter (1,670 kg dry weight) from the GranTurismo, and more aerodynamic than any previous GranTurismo model - all with the same fuel consumption as the regular GranTurismo. In addition to two air intakes in the bonnet, the MC Stradale also receives a new front splitter and rear air dam for better aerodynamics, downforce, and improved cooling of carbon-ceramic brakes and engine. The body modifications make the car 48 mm (1.9 in) longer.

The MC Race Shift 6-speed robotised manual gearbox (which shares its electronics and some of its hardware from the Ferrari 599 GTO) usually operates in an "auto" mode, but the driver can switch this to 'sport' or 'race' (shifting happening in 60 milliseconds in 'race' mode), which affects gearbox operations, suspension, traction control, and even the sound of the engine. The MC Stradale is the first GranTurismo to break the 300 km/h (186 mph) barrier, with a claimed top speed of 303 km/h (188 mph).

The push for the Maserati GranTurismo MC Stradale came from existing Maserati customers who wanted a road-legal super sports car that looked and felt like the GT4, GTD, and Trofeo race cars. It has been confirmed by the Maserati head office that only 497 units of 2-seater MC Stradales were built in total from 2011 to 2013 in the world, Europe: 225 units, China: 45 units, Hong Kong: 12, Taiwan: 23 units, Japan: 33 units, Oceania: 15 units and 144 units in other countries.

US market MC's do not have the "Stradale" part of the name, and they are sold with a fully automatic six-speed transmission rather than the one available in the rest of the world. US market cars also do not come with carbon fibre lightweight seats like the rest of the world.

The MC Stradale's suspension is 8% stiffer and the car rides slightly lower than the GranTurismo S following feedback from racing drivers who appreciated the better grip and intuitive driving feel of the lower profile. Pirelli has custom-designed extra-wide 20-inch P Zero Corsa tyres to fit new alloy wheels.

The Brembo braking system with carbon-ceramic discs weighs around 60% less than the traditional system with steel discs. The front is equipped with 380 x 34 mm ventilated discs, operated by a 6 piston caliper. The rear discs measure 360 x 32 mm with four-piston calipers. The stopping distance is 33 m at 100 km/h (62 mph) with an average deceleration of 1.2g.

At the 2013 Geneva Motor Show, an update to the GranTurismo MC Stradale was unveiled. It features an updated 4.7 L (4,691 cc) V8 engine rated at 338 kW (460 PS) at 7,000 rpm and 520 N⋅m (384 lbf⋅ft) of torque at 4,750 rpm, as well as the MC Race Shift 6-speed robotized manual gearbox which shifts in 60 milliseconds in 'race' mode. The top speed is 303 km/h (188 mph). All models were built at the historic factory in viale Ciro Menotti in Modena.

=== GranTurismo Sport (2012–2019) ===
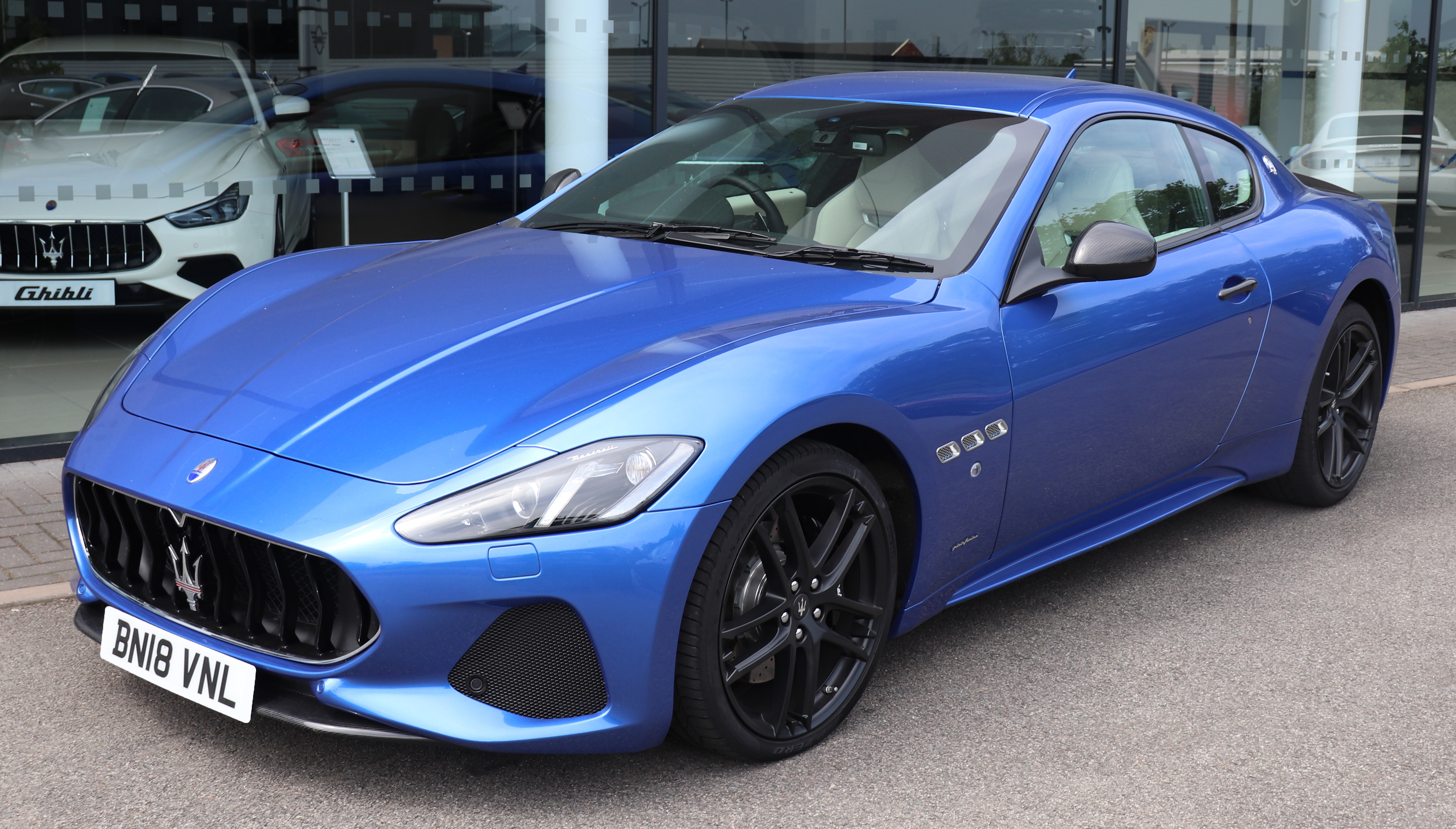
2018 Maserati GranTurismo Sport

Replacing both the GranTurismo S and S Automatic, the GranTurismo Sport was unveiled in March 2012 at the Geneva Motor Show. The revised 4.7L engine is rated at 338 kW (460 PS).

From 2018, GranTurismo Sport features a unique MC Stradale-inspired front fascia, new headlights and new, sportier steering wheel and seats. The ZF six-speed automatic gearbox is now standard, while the six-speed automated manual transaxle is available as an option. The latter has steering column-mounted paddle-shifters, a feature that's optional with the automatic gearbox. New redesigned front bumper and air splitter lowers drag coefficient from Cd=0.33 to 0.32.

=== GranCabrio I (2010–2019) ===
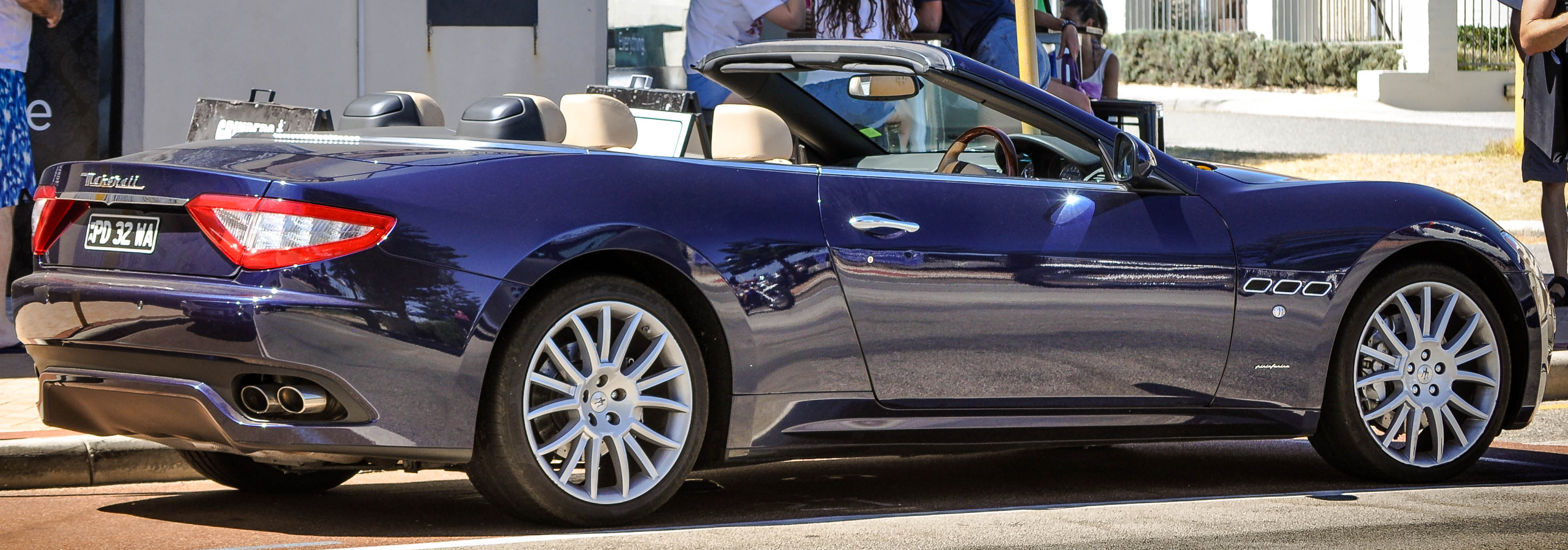
Maserati GranCabrio

The GranCabrio (GranTurismo Convertible in the United States and Canada) is a convertible version of the GranTurismo S Automatic, equipped with a canvas folding roof. The GranCabrio retains the four seat configuration of the GranTurismo coupé, and is thus Maserati's first ever four-seater convertible.

The GranCabrio was unveiled at the 2009 Frankfurt Motor Show, with production beginning in 2010. It is built in the Viale Ciro Menotti Maserati factory. European sales were to begin in February 2010, with the United States receiving its first cars a month later. Planned sales for 2010 were 2,100 units, of which two-thirds were intended to go stateside.

The GranCabrio is powered by the same 4.7-litre V8 engine (rated at 324 kW (440 PS) at 7,000 rpm and 490 N⋅m (361 lb⋅ft) at 4,750 rpm) that is fitted to the GranTurismo S Automatic. About 11,715 units of the convertible model were produced.

=== GranCabrio Sport (2011–2019) ===
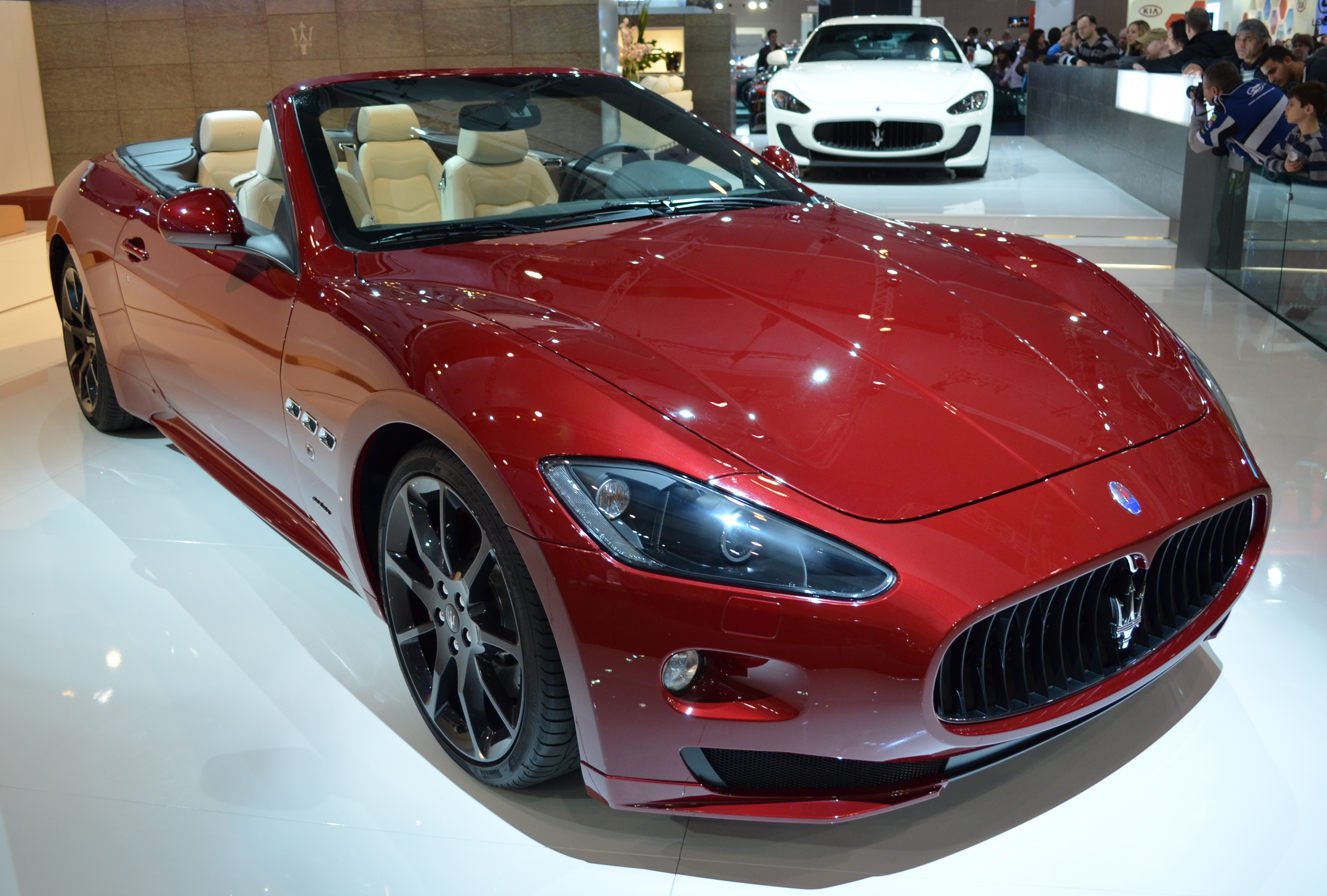
GranCabrio Sport at the 2011 Melbourne Motor Show

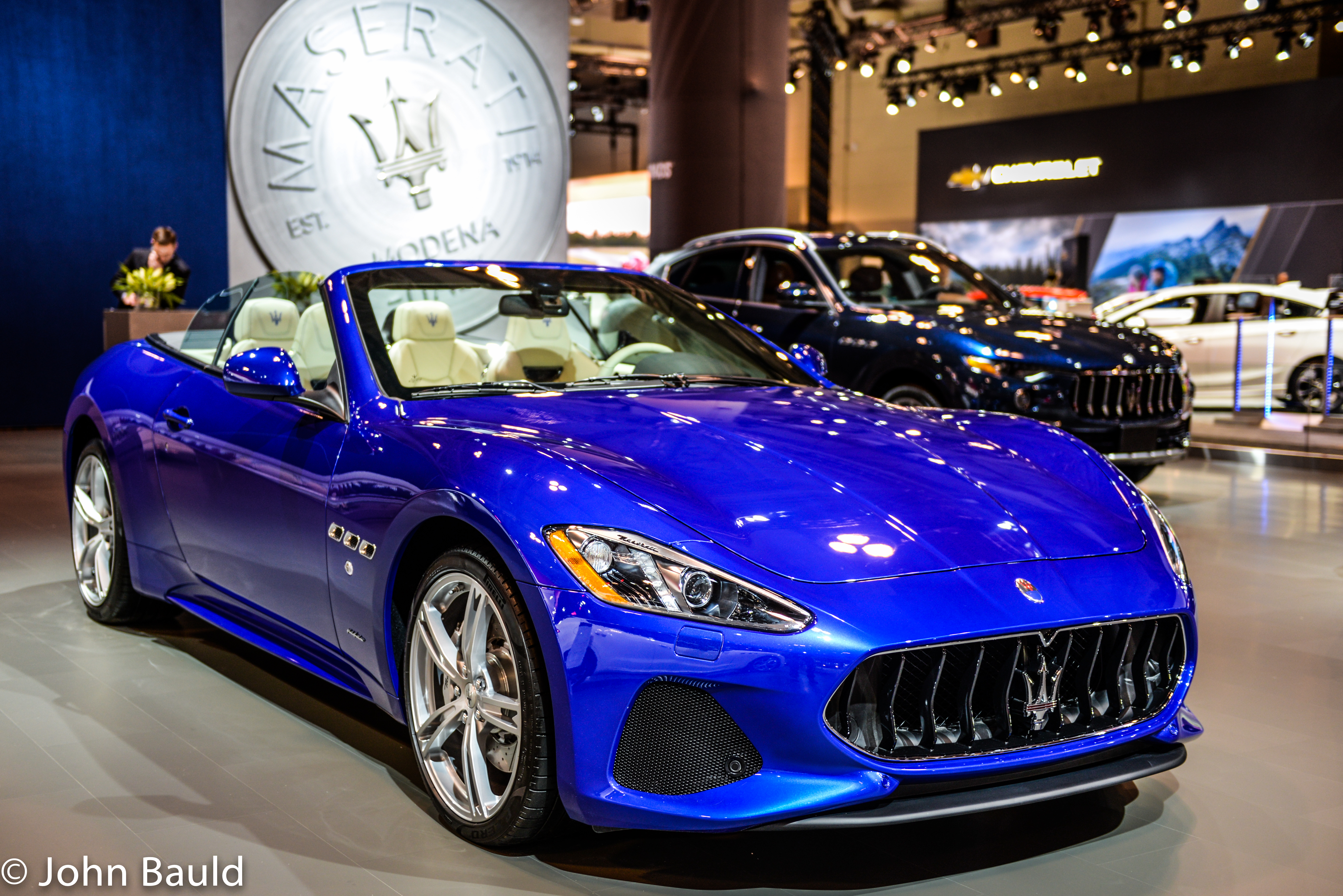
Post-facelift GranCabrio Sport

At the 2011 Geneva Motor Show, Maserati unveiled a new version of the GranCabrio, with an enhanced level of performance and handling. This version also has the 4.7-litre V8, coupled with the ZF six-speed automatic transmission and fitted with the slightly uprated 450 PS (331 kW; 444 hp) version of the V8 engine, with 510 N⋅m (376 lb⋅ft) of torque.

From 2018, to hint at the car's more sporting nature, the headlights have black surrounds and other details such as the bars in the grille are also finished in black. There are also larger side skirts as well as tiny winglets on the lower front corners. New front bumper and air splitter substantially lower drag coefficient from original Cd=0.35 to 0.33.

=== GranCabrio Fendi ===
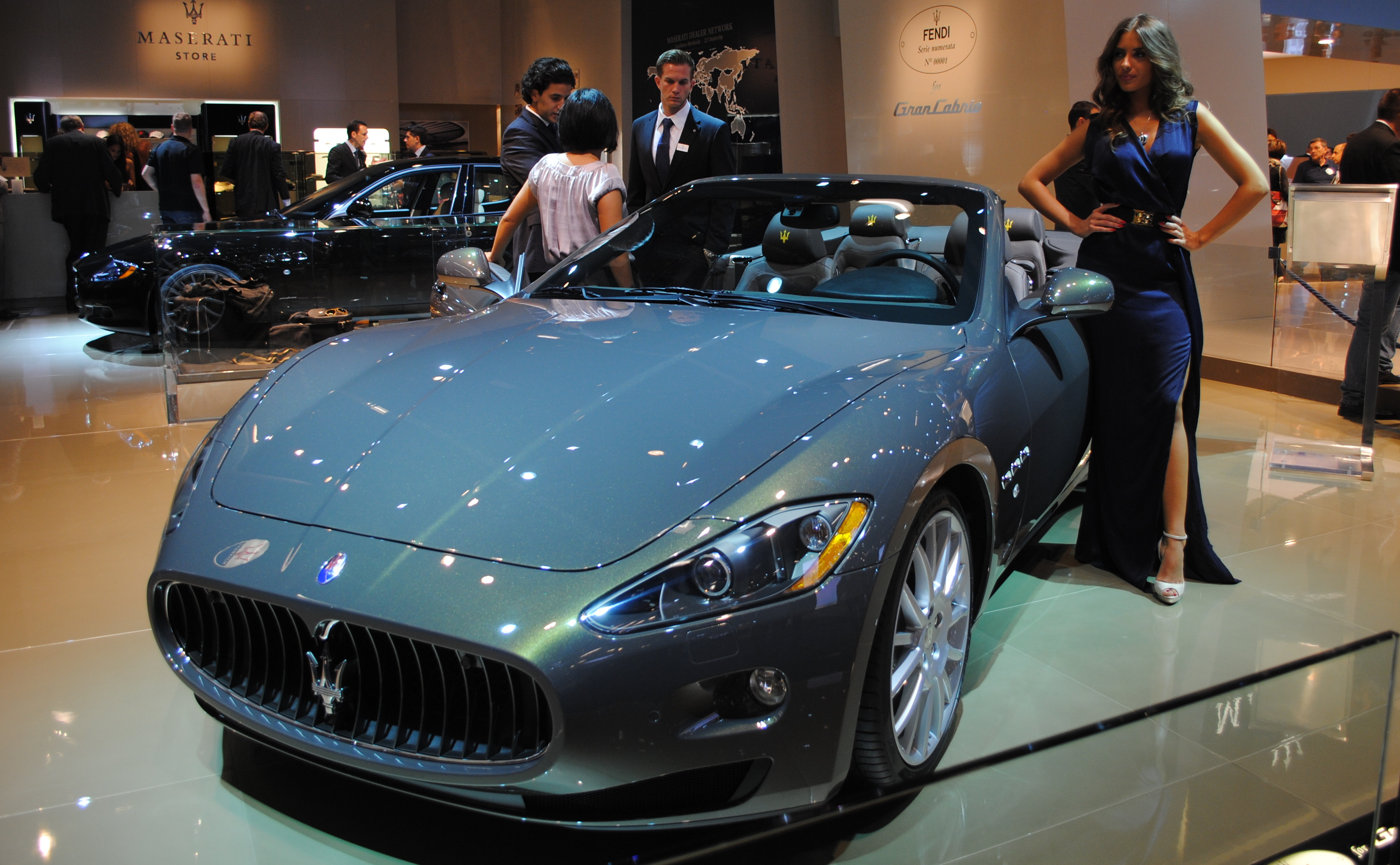
GranCabrio Fendi

The Fendi is a version of the GranCabrio designed by Silvia Venturini Fendi. It was unveiled at the 2011 Frankfurt Motor Show.

=== GranCabrio MC (2013–2019) ===
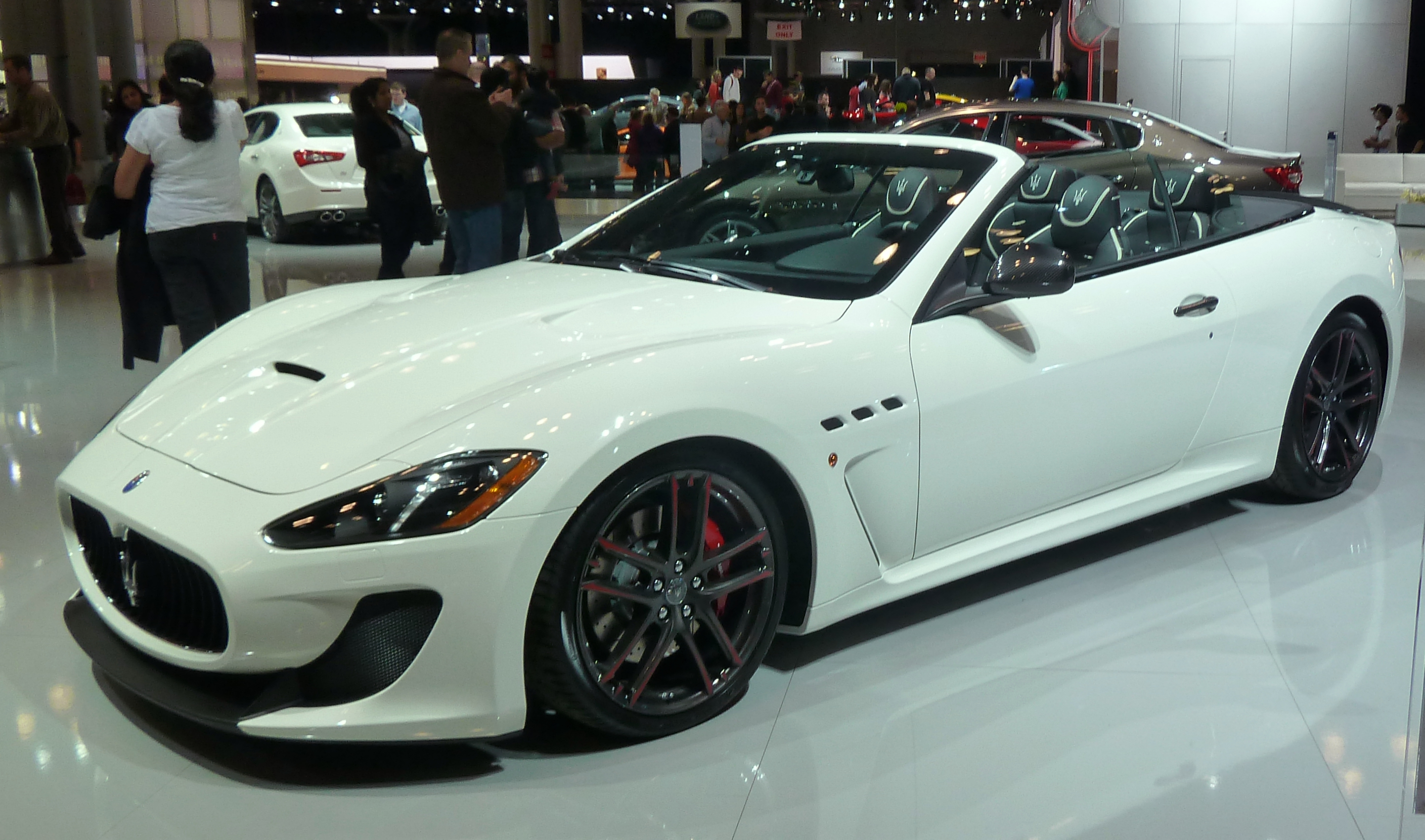
Maserati GranCabrio MC

The GranCabrio MC four-seater open-top is 48 mm (1.9 in) longer than GranCabrio, with a front end inspired by the MC Stradale and equipped with improved aerodynamics compared to standard models. Power comes from a 4.7 L 90° V8 delivering 460 PS (338 kW; 454 hp) and 520 N⋅m (384 lb⋅ft) of torque. The top speed is 289 km/h (180 mph) and it can accelerate from 0–100 km/h (62 mph) in 4.9 seconds. The only available transmission is an MC Auto Shift, 6-speed ZF automatic. Wheels are 20 inch MC Design units. It premiered on 27 September 2012 at the Paris Motor Show.

=== Specifications ===
The architecture of the GranTurismo and GranCabrio derives from the M139 platform of the fifth generation Quattroporte, shortened about 12 cm (4.7 in) in the wheelbase and 8 cm (3.1 in) in the rear overhang. Like on the Quattroporte the engine is pushed back beyond the front wheel's centerline, inside the wheelbase—in the front mid-engine, rear-wheel-drive layout. This confers a 49%/51% front/rear weight distribution to automatic transmission cars. "MC SportShift" automated manual transmission variants have a further rear-biased 47%/53% weight distribution, due to the gearbox mounted at the rear with the differential—in the transaxle layout.

The chassis is made of stamped and boxed steel sections, and is complemented by two aluminium subframes: one at the front supporting the engine and providing suspension attaching points, and a tubular one at the rear supporting both suspension and differential (or the entire transmission in transaxle cars). Structural body panels are steel, the bonnet is aluminium and the boot lid is a single sheet moulding compound piece.

The suspension system consists of unequal length control arms with forged aluminium arms and cast aluminium uprights, coil springs and anti-roll bars on both axles. Dampers are either fixed-rate and set up for handling or "Skyhook" adaptive. The Skyhook system uses aluminium-bodied gas dampers, allowing automatic and continuous damping rate adjustment by means of proportioning valves.

=== Engines ===
The engines are from Ferrari-Maserati F136 V8 family.

Model	Years	Type	Power at rpm	Torque at rpm	Redline (rpm)
GranTurismo	2007–2019	4,244 cc (259.0 cu in) 90° V8	298 kW (405 PS) at 7,100	460 N⋅m (339 lb⋅ft) at 4,750	7,250
GranTurismo S	2008–2011	4,691 cc (286.3 cu in) 90° V8	324 kW (440 PS) at 7,000	490 N⋅m (361 lb⋅ft) at 4,750	7,500
GranTurismo S	2011–2012	4,691 cc (286.3 cu in) 90° V8	331 kW (450 PS) at 7,000	510 N⋅m (376 lb⋅ft) at 4,750	7,500
GranTurismo S Automatic	2009–2012	4,691 cc (286.3 cu in) 90° V8	324 kW (440 PS) at 7,000	490 N⋅m (361 lb⋅ft) at 4,750	7,200
GranTurismo MC Stradale	2011–2013	4,691 cc (286.3 cu in) 90° V8	331 kW (450 PS) at 7,000	510 N⋅m (376 lb⋅ft) at 4,750	7,200
GranTurismo MC Stradale	2013–2019	4,691 cc (286.3 cu in) 90° V8	338 kW (460 PS) at 7,000	520 N⋅m (384 lb⋅ft) at 4,750	7,500
GranTurismo Sport	2012–2019	4,691 cc (286.3 cu in) 90° V8	338 kW (460 PS) at 7,000	520 N⋅m (384 lb⋅ft) at 4,750	7,500
GranCabrio	2010–2012	4,691 cc (286.3 cu in) 90° V8	324 kW (440 PS) at 7,000	490 N⋅m (361 lb⋅ft) at 4,750	7,200
GranCabrio	2012–2019	4,691 cc (286.3 cu in) 90° V8	331 kW (450 PS) at 7,000	510 N⋅m (376 lb⋅ft) at 4,750	7,200
GranCabrio Sport	2011–2012	4,691 cc (286.3 cu in) 90° V8	331 kW (450 PS) at 7,000	510 N⋅m (376 lb⋅ft) at 4,750	7,200
GranCabrio Sport	2012–2019	4,691 cc (286.3 cu in) 90° V8	338 kW (460 PS) at 7,000	520 N⋅m (384 lb⋅ft) at 4,750	7,500
GranCabrio MC	2013–2019	4,691 cc (286.3 cu in) 90° V8	338 kW (460 PS) at 7,000	520 N⋅m (384 lb⋅ft) at 4,750	7,500

=== Transmissions ===
Depending on the model, two transmissions were available on the GranTurismo and GranCabrio: a conventional torque converter 6-speed automatic or a 6-speed automated manual gearbox.

As on the Quattroporte, the automatic transmission is a ZF 6HP 26. This transmission includes Auto Normal Mode, Auto Sports Mode, Auto ICE Mode, and Manual Mode. Auto Normal mode shifts gears automatically at low rpm to achieve the most comfortable ride and at higher rpm when driving style becomes more sporty. AutoSport Mode changes gears 40% faster than in Normal Mode, downshifts when lifting off as a corner approaches; then it activates the stability control, stiffening Skyhook suspension, and opening exhaust valves when the engine is over 3,000 rpm (in the GranTurismo S Automatic). Auto ICE mode is for low-grip conditions; it reduces maximum torque at the wheel, prevents 1st gear starts, and only allows gear changes below 1,000 rpm.

The automated manual transmission includes Manual Normal and Manual Sport, Manual Sport with MC-Shift, Auto Normal, Auto Sport, Auto ICE modes.

Model	Years	Type
GranTurismo	2007–2019	ZF 6-speed automatic
GranTurismo S	2008–2019	6-speed automated manual with twin dry-plate clutch and paddle-shifters
GranTurismo S Automatic	2009–2019	ZF 6-speed automatic
GranCabrio	2010–2019	ZF 6-speed automatic
GranCabrio Sport	2011–2019	ZF 6-speed automatic
GranTurismo Sport	2012–2019	ZF 6-speed automatic or 6-speed automated manual

=== Performance ===
Model	Years	Acceleration 0–100 km/h (0-62 mph) (seconds)	400 metre (Quarter Mile)	1000 metre	Top speed	Acceleration 80–120 km/h (seconds)	Braking 100–0 km/h (metre)
GranTurismo	2007–2019	5.2	13.4	23.9 seconds at 225 km/h (140 mph)	285 km/h (177 mph)	3.7	35
GranTurismo S	2008–2012	4.9	13	23 seconds at 234 km/h (145 mph)	295 km/h (183 mph)	3.5	36
GranTurismo S Automatic	2009–2012	5	13.2	23.3 seconds after 228 km/h (142 mph)	295 km/h (183 mph)	3.3	35
GranCabrio	2010–2019	5.2	13.9	24.8 seconds at 227 km/h (141 mph)	283 km/h (176 mph)	3.3	35
GranCabrio Sport	2011–2019	5.0	13.5	24 seconds	285 km/h (177 mph)	-	35
GranTurismo MC Stradale	2011–2019	4.5	12.5	?	303 km/h (188 mph)	?	?
GranTurismo Sport	2012–2019	4.7	12.5	?	301 km/h (187 mph)	?	?
GranTurismo Sport (automatic)	2012–2019	4.8	12.6	?	300 km/h (186 mph)	?	?

=== One-offs and special editions ===
==== Touring Sciàdipersia ====
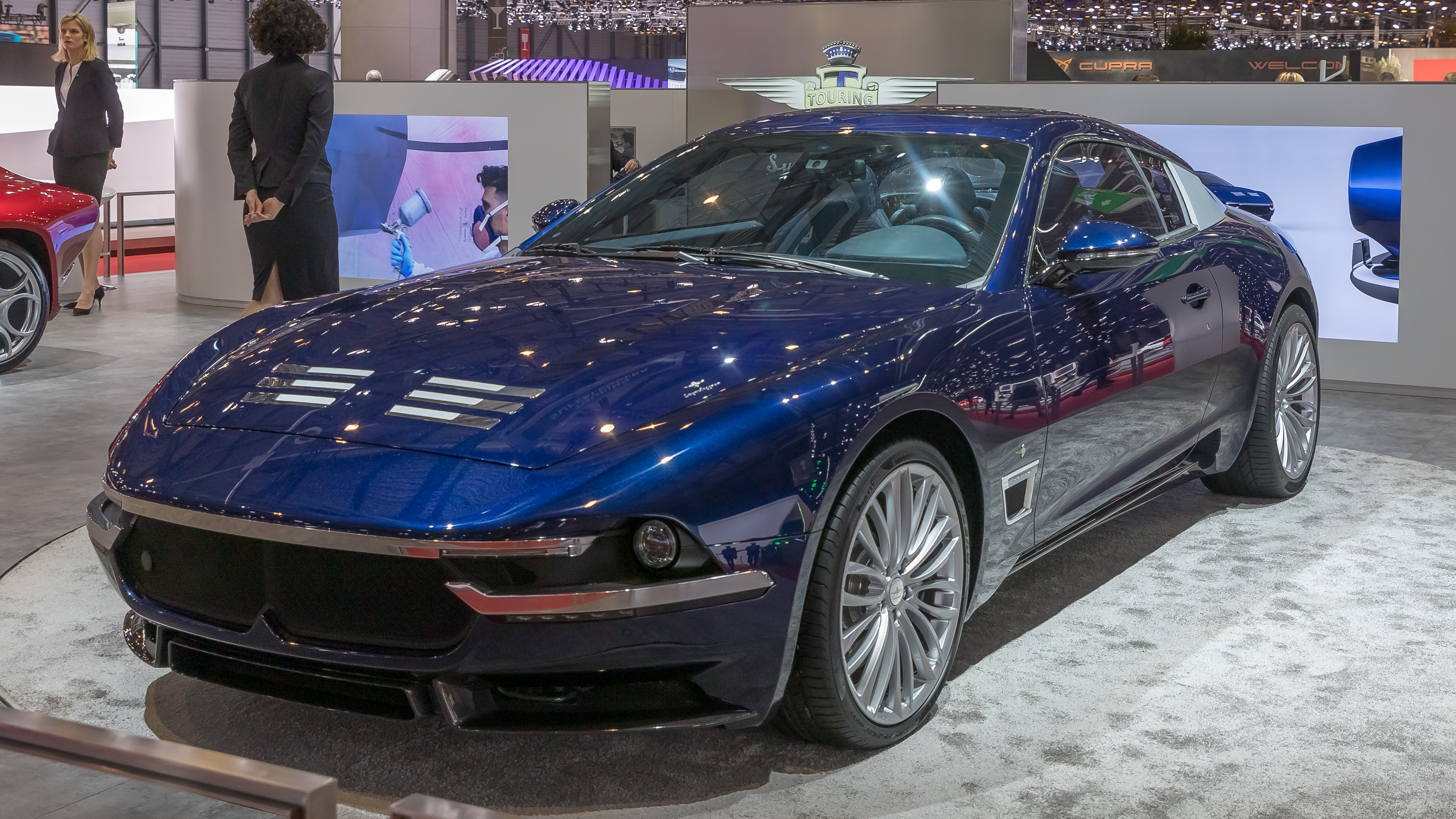
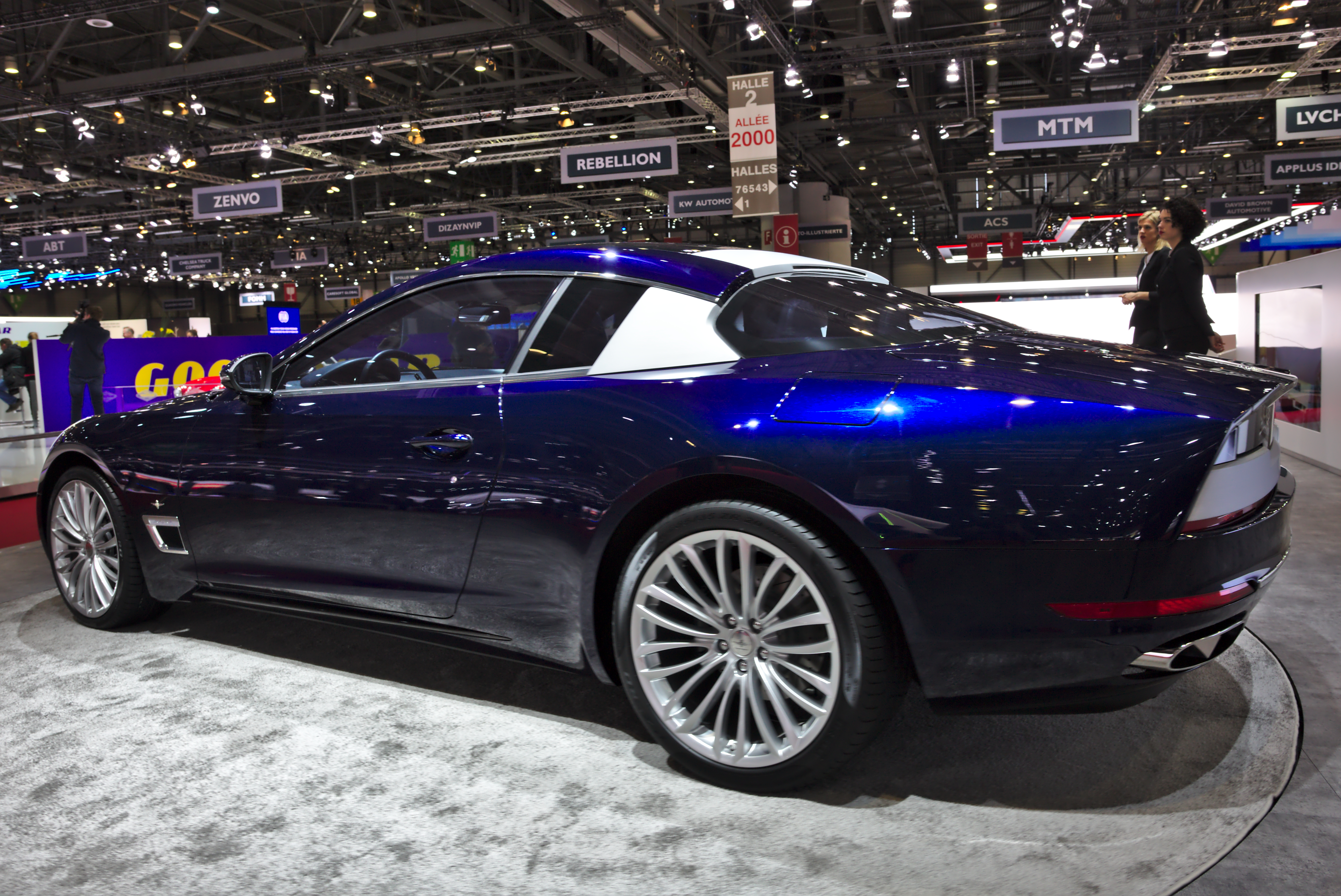
2018 Touring Sciàdipersia

Debuted by Carrozzeria Touring Superleggera in March 2018 at the Geneva Motor Show, the car was based on the Maserati GranTurismo and inspired by the original Maserati 5000 GT Shah of Persia.

==== Touring Sciàdipersia Cabriolet ====
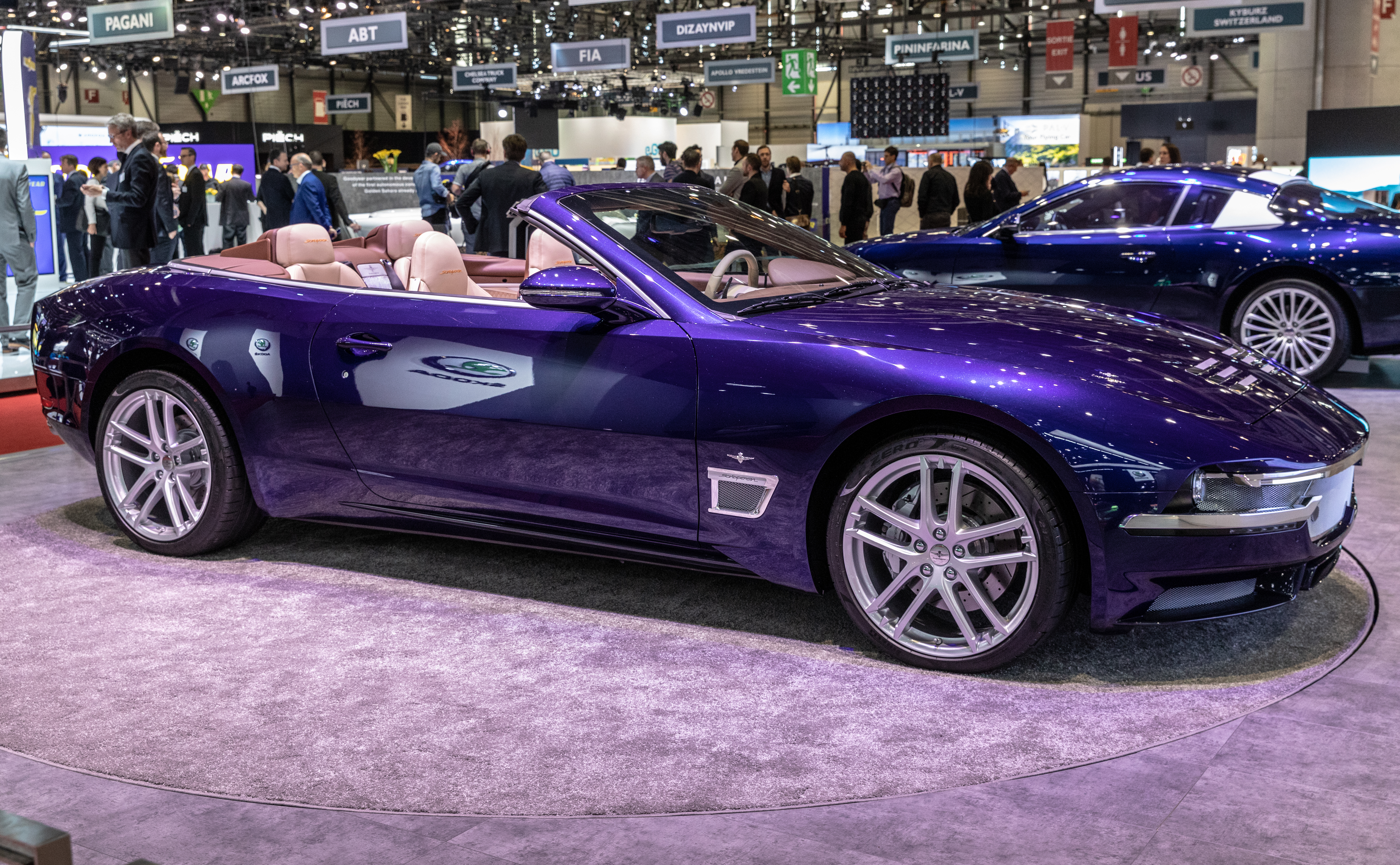
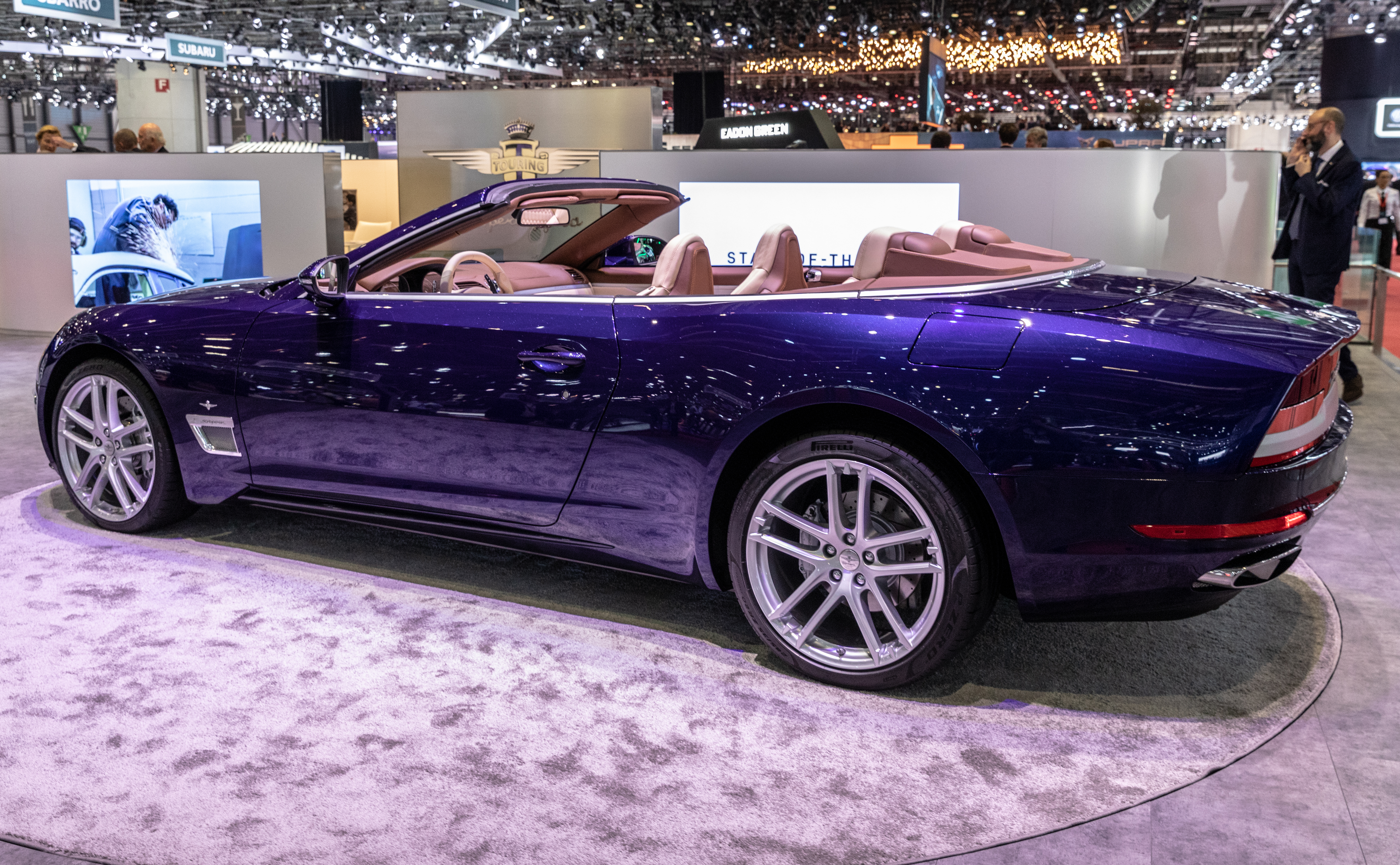
2019 Touring Sciàdipersia Cabriolet

The car was introduced by Carrozzeria Touring Superleggera at the Geneva Motor Show in March 2019 and was based on the Maserati GranCabrio. A total of 15 Coupés and Cabriolets are to be manufactured, with reportedly only one Coupé manufactured and the remaining 14 being Cabriolets.

==== GranTurismo Zéda ====
It's the final production example of the first generation GranTurismo. It was presented painted in a gradient of blue, black and white colours.

== GranTurismo II (M189, 2023–present) ==
Second generation (M189)
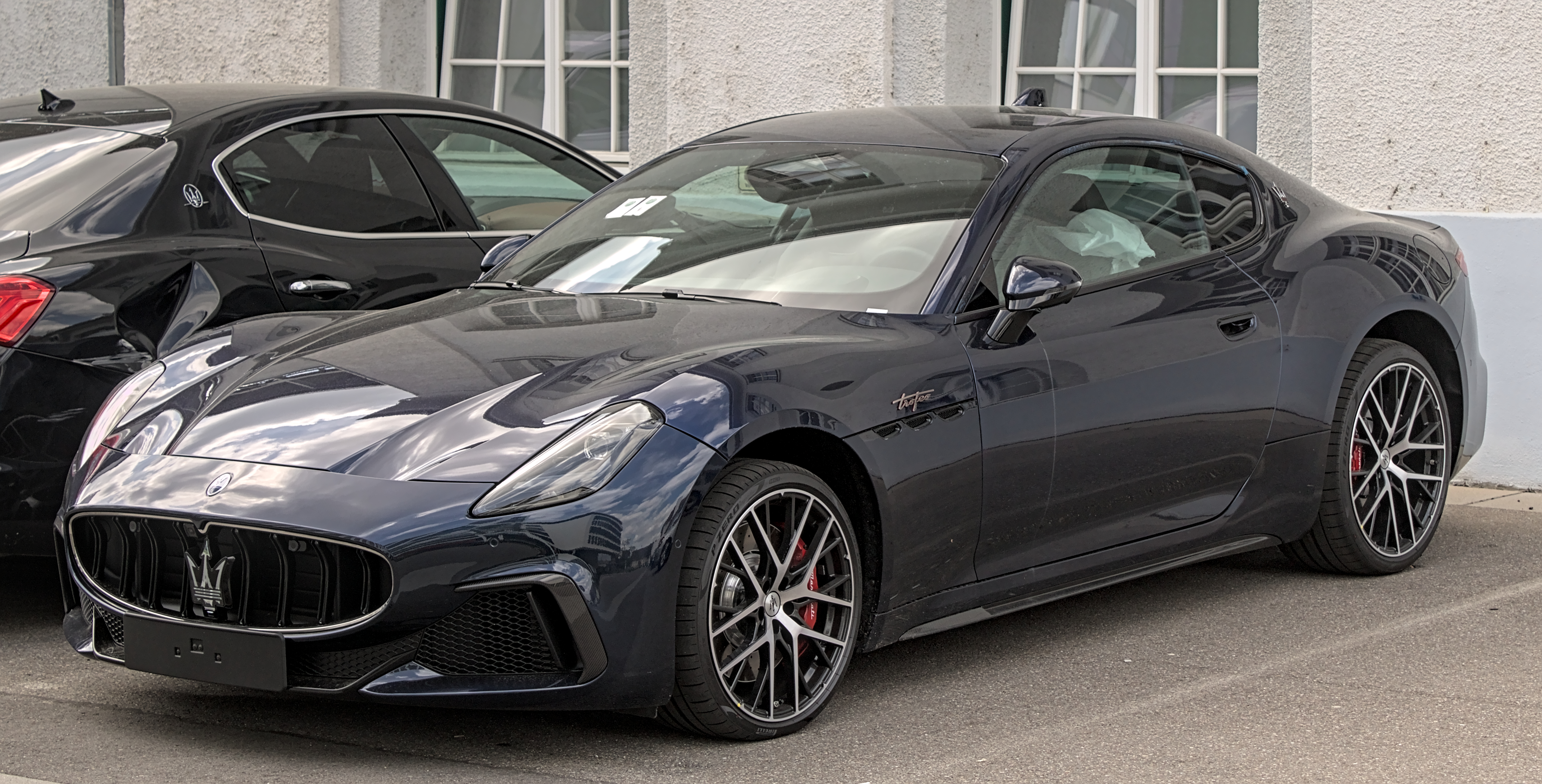
- 2023 GranTurismo Trofeo

Overview
- Manufacturer: Maserati (Stellantis)
- Production: April 2023 – present
- Model years: 2023–present
- Assembly: Italy: Turin (Mirafiori); Italy: Modena (2025–present)
- Designer: Centro Stile Maserati under Klaus Busse

Body and chassis
- Layout: Front-mid-engine, four-wheel-drive (Modena and Trofeo); Triple-motors, four-wheel-drive (Folgore)
- Platform: FCA Giorgio Sport
- Related: Maserati Grecale; Alfa Romeo Giulia (2015)

Powertrain
- Engine: 3.0 L Nettuno twin-turbocharged V6 petrol (Modena and Trofeo)
- Electric motor: 3x Permanent magnet synchronous radial motors (Folgore)
- Power output: • Modena: 490 PS (360 kW; 483 hp); • Trofeo: 550 PS (405 kW; 542 hp); • Folgore: 762 PS (560 kW; 752 hp)
- Transmission: 8-speed ZF 8HP automatic (Modena and Trofeo); Single-speed automatic (Folgore)
- Battery: 92.5 kWh, 800V lithium ion (Folgore)
- Electric range: 450 km (280 mi)

Dimensions
- Wheelbase: 2,929 mm (115.3 in)
- Length: 4,959–4,966 mm (195.2–195.5 in)
- Width: 1,955 mm (77.0 in)
- Height: 1,353 mm (53.3 in)
- Curb weight: 1,795–2,260 kg (3,957–4,982 lb)

The second-generation of the GranTurismo was revealed online in October 2022. Three models: the base Modena, the Trofeo, and the battery electric Folgore are available.

Internally designated M189, the second-generation GranTurismo is based on the Giorgio platform which underpins a range of vehicles that have internal combustion engines or battery electric powertrain systems. The GranTurismo is highly based on the Grecale compact crossover which features a similar design, similar technical data, and models.

Its length and width have increased by 78 mm (3.1 in) and 108 mm (4.3 in) respectively, while its height has stayed the same. Its wheelbase has decreased by 13 mm (0.51 in). Production for the UK started in April 2023, while production for the US is scheduled to start in MY2024.

Maserati states the car is made up of 65 per cent alloy, including aluminum and magnesium. All models utilise a double wishbone suspension at the front, with a multi-link setup at the rear. Air suspension with adaptive damping is standard.

Engines, transmission, all-wheel drive, chassis, and brakes are controlled via Maserati’s "Vehicle Domain Control Module", which changes what the vehicle does based on the mode. Modes consist of: Comfort, GT, Sport and Corsa. Suspension, engine, exhaust and transmission start changing progressively as modes go up.

The GranTurismo features a 310 mm (12.2 in) digital dashboard and a 310 mm (12.3 in) central touchscreen that controls the vehicle primary functions. A smaller 220 mm (8.8 in) is below the central screen. A configurable head-up display and a digital rear-view mirror are also offered. Boot space is 310 litres (68 imp gal; 82 US gal). The vehicle features the voice-activated "Maserati Intelligent Assistant", which includes over-the-air update capability. Wireless Apple CarPlay and Android Auto are available, along with Alexa integration.

ADAS features include: adaptive cruise with lane centring, autonomous emergency braking for reversing, a 360-degree surround view camera system and a dynamic road view that shows a 3-dimensional version of surrounding vehicles on the dashboard.

For the Folgore, it charges via a Type 2 port. Slow charging will take 4h and 30 minutes at a capacity of 22 kW. Fast charging will take 18 minutes at a capacity of 270 kW.

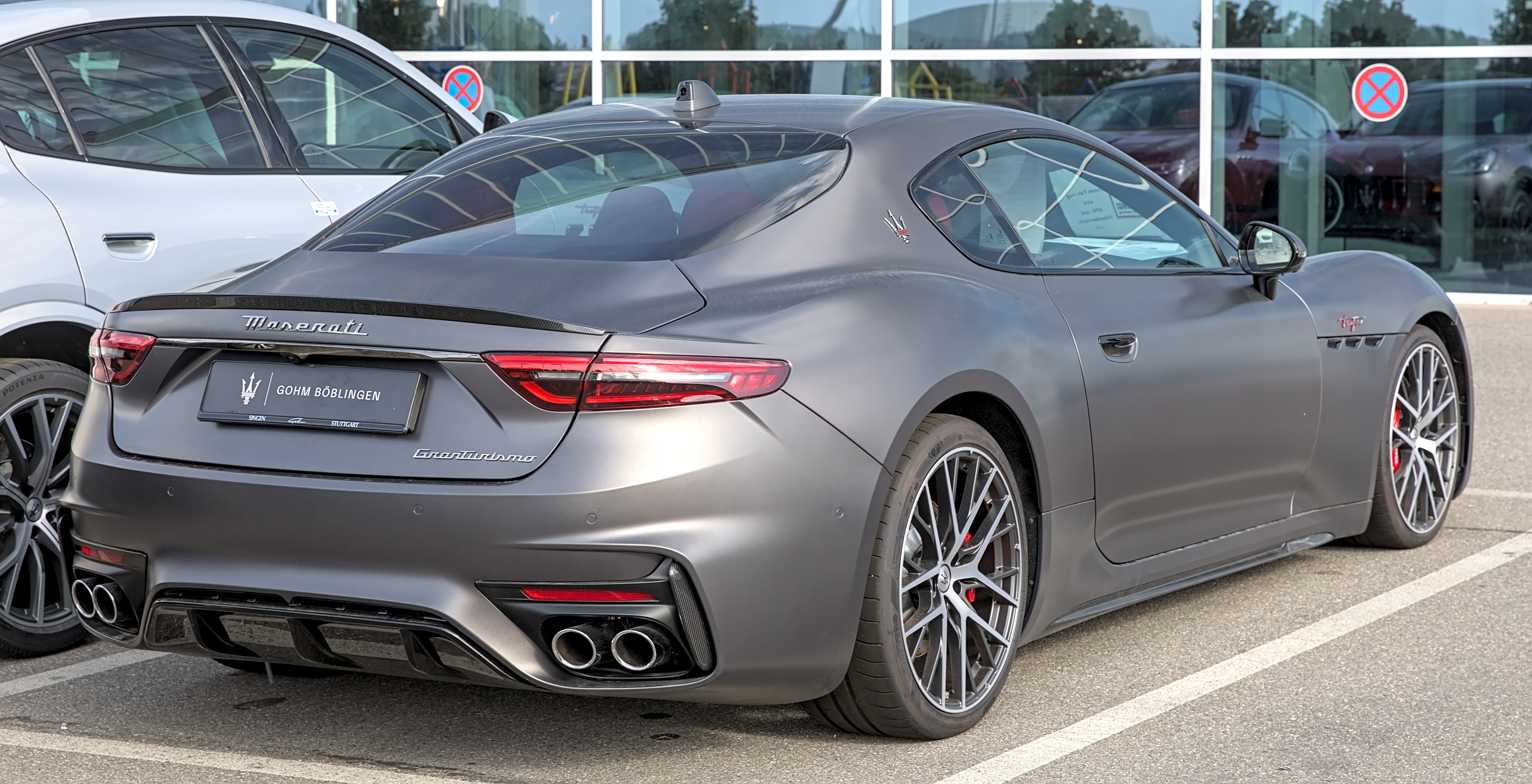
Rear view

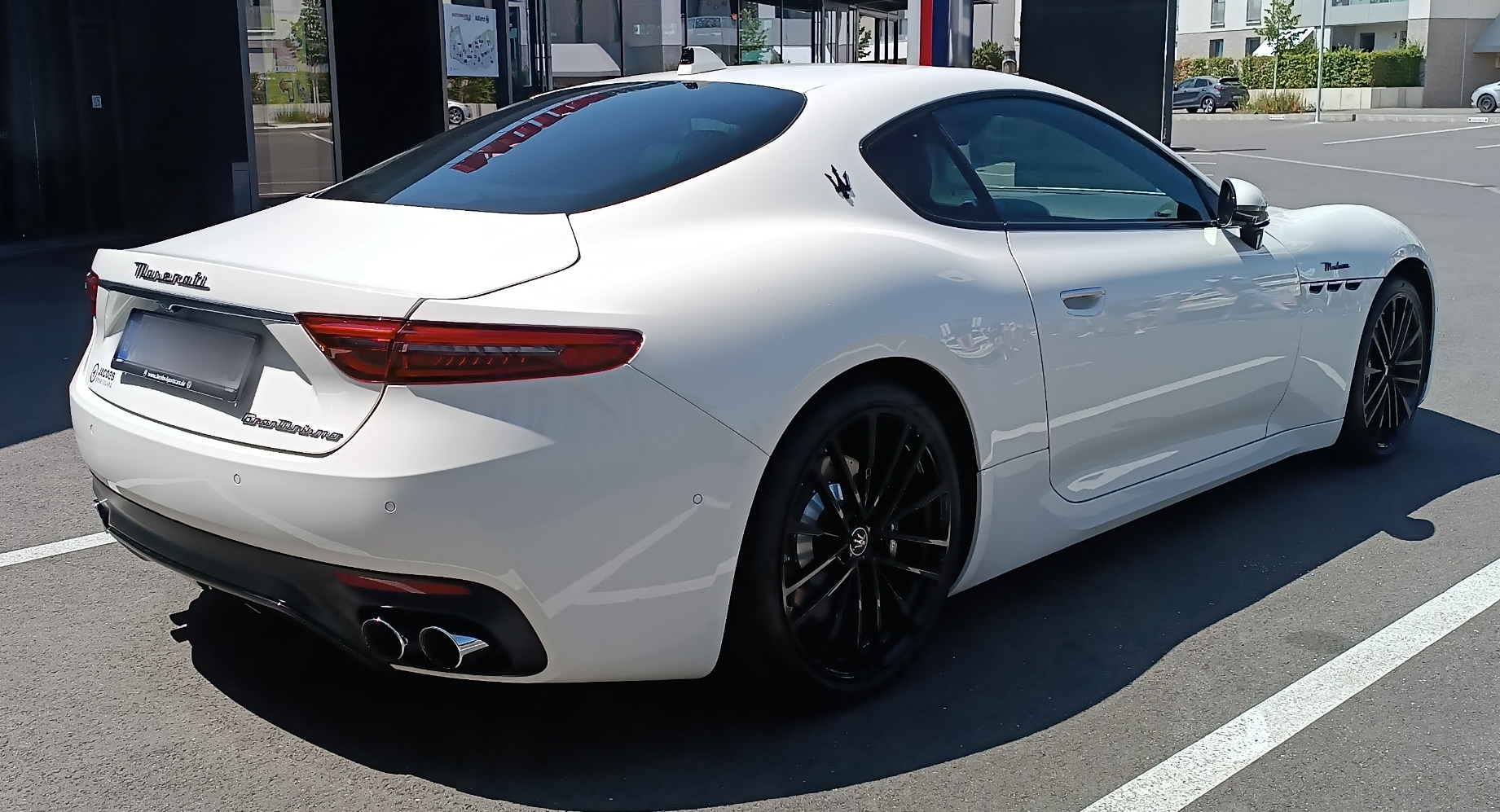
2023 Maserati GranTurismo Modena coupé

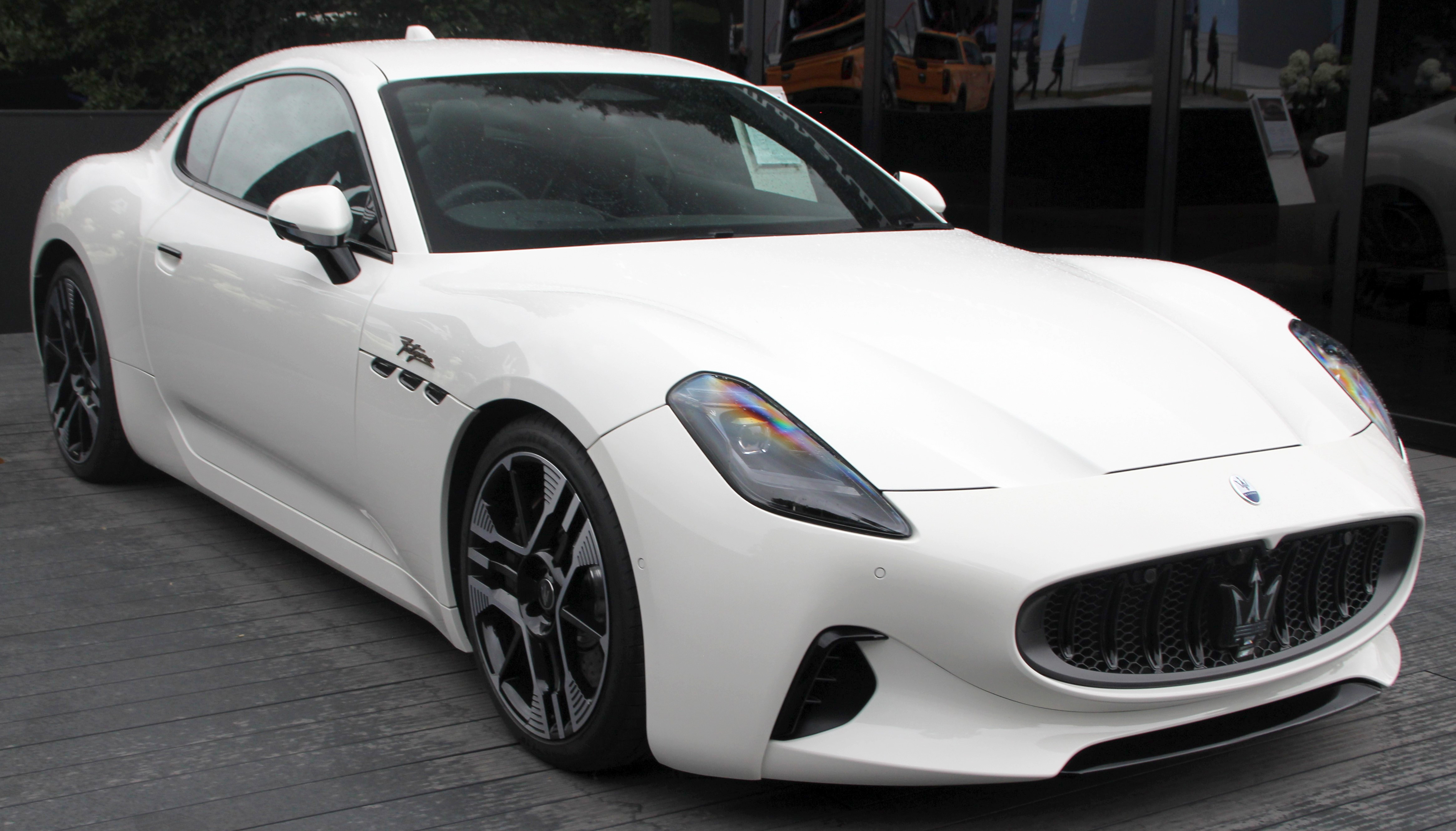
Folgore

=== GranCabrio II ===
In 2024, Maserati added an open-top variant based on the GranTurismo, the GranCabrio. It was initially offered only as a 550 PS Trofeo or a 761 PS fully-electric Folgore, both with AWD.

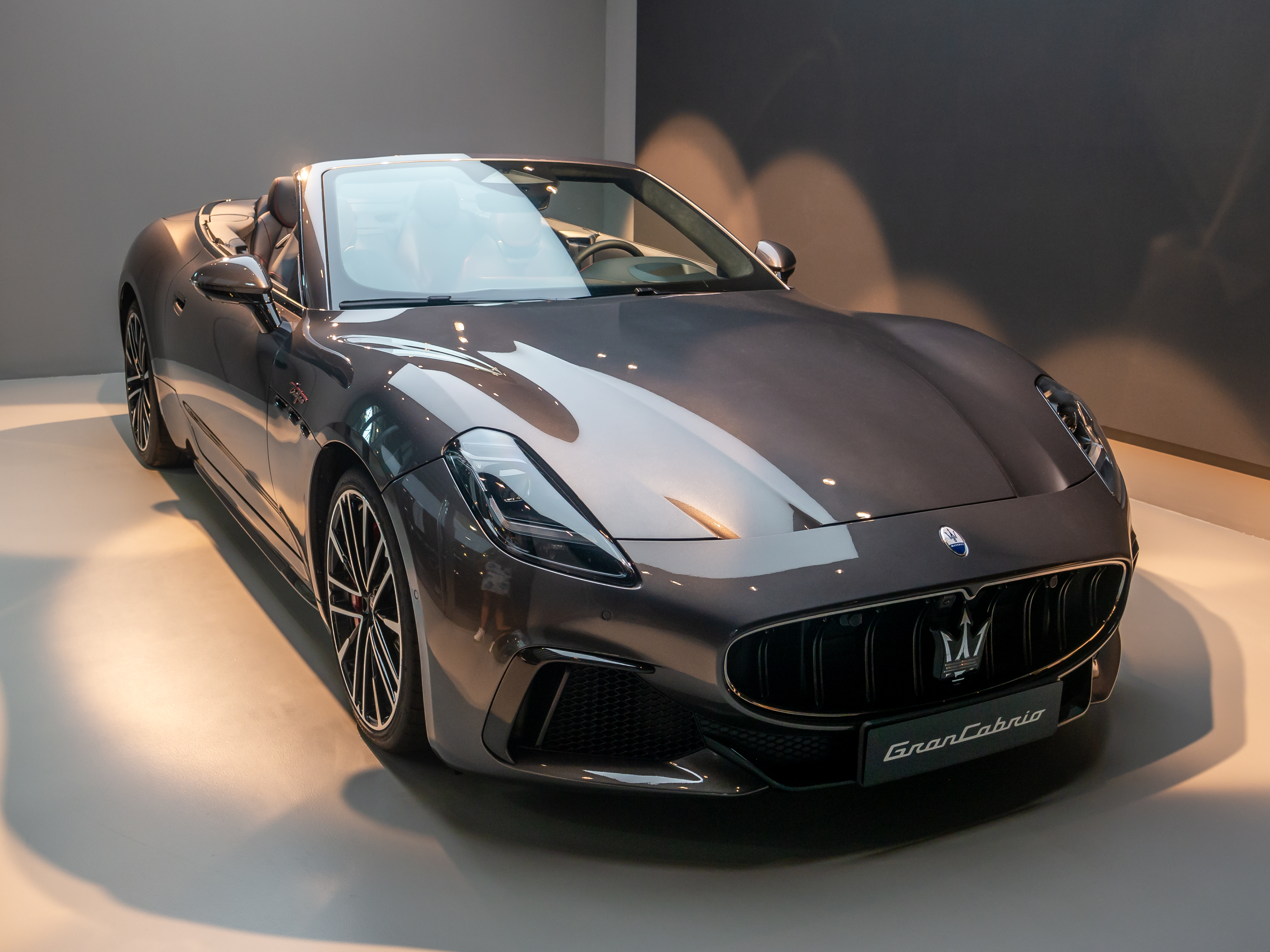
Maserati GranCabrio Trofeo

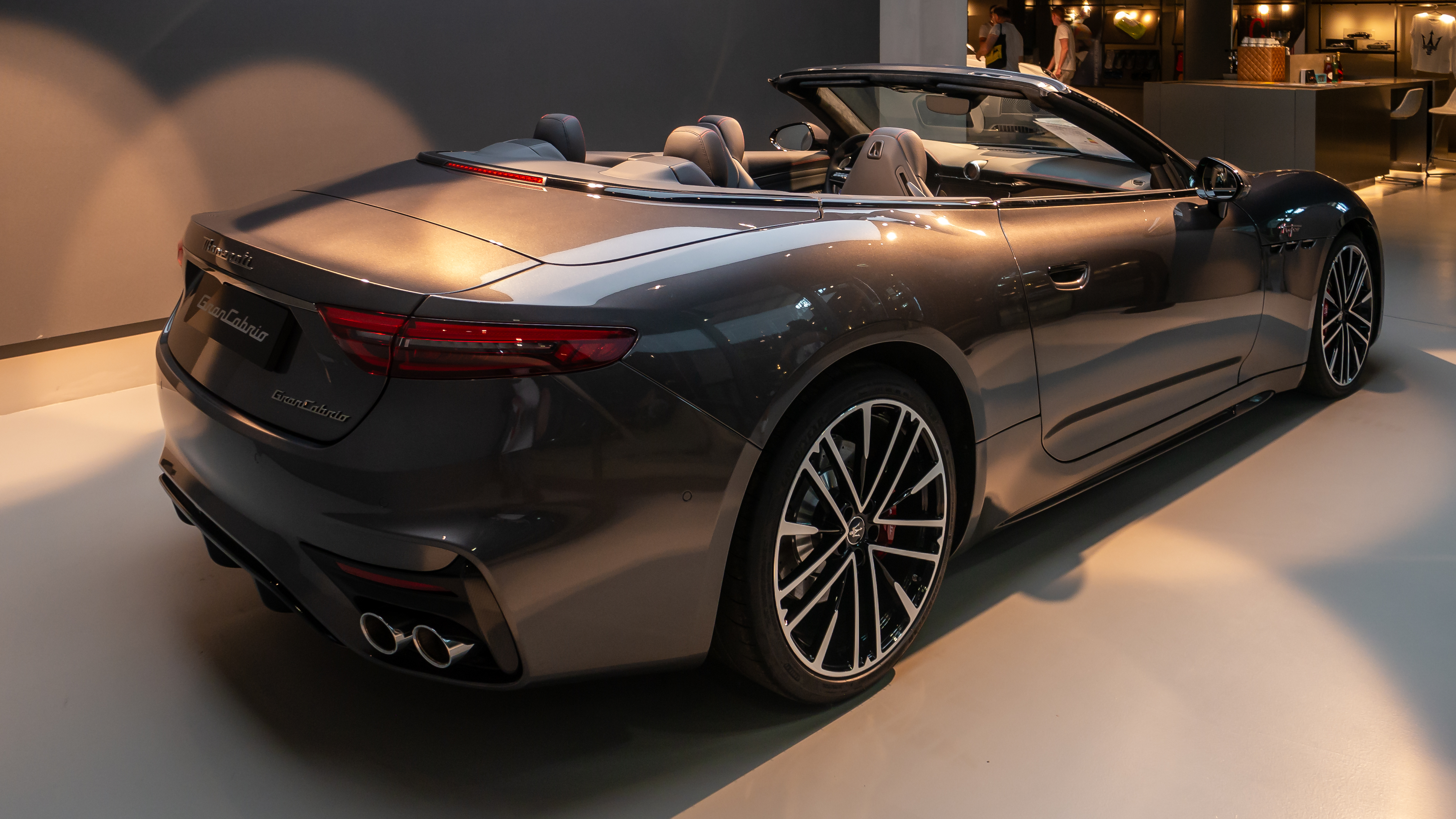
Rear view

=== 2026 facelift ===
On 18 June 2026, Maserati introduced a mid-cycle facelift for the second-generation GranTurismo and GranCabrio for the 2027 model year. The updates introduce revisions to the exterior styling, interior technology, and variant powertrains.

2026 Maserati GranTurismo Trofeo coupé

Rear view

Interior (GranTurismo)

2026 Maserati GranCabrio

Rear view

Interior (GranCabrio)

=== Powertrain ===
Petrol models use a 2992 cm^{3} (3.0L) Maserati Nettuno engine, while the Folgore has 3x electric motors, each producing 400 hp (300 kW). Petrol models use an 8-speed automatic transmission, while the Folgore uses a single-speed.

Specifications
Model	Modena	Trofeo	Folgore
Propulsion type	Internal combustion engine		Battery electric
Layout	Front-mid-engine, four-wheel-drive		Triple-motors, four-wheel-drive
Propulsion system	3.0 L Nettuno twin-turbocharged V6 petrol		3 x Permanent magnet synchronous radial motors
Power	360 kW (490 PS)	405 kW (550 PS)	560 kW (761 PS)
Torque	600 N⋅m (443 lb⋅ft)	650 N⋅m (479 lb⋅ft)	1,350 N⋅m (996 lb⋅ft)
0–100 km/h (62 mph)	3.9 sec	3.5 sec	2.7 sec
Top speed	302 km/h (188 mph)	320 km/h (199 mph)	325 km/h (202 mph)
Range			450 km (280 mi)

==== Styling and aerodynamics ====
The exterior updates feature a more prominent "shark nose" front fascia inspired by the MCPura, incorporating reshaped, angular air intakes and a revised front grille graphic to optimize cooling and downforce. Additional aerodynamic alterations were made to the vehicle underbody and the rear diffuser. The lighting units were revised with new clear-lens LED taillights. Furthermore, a new set of wider, gloss black "Tridente" wheels increases the track width by 10 mm (0.39 in) to enhance cornering stability. The high-performance Trofeo variant receives an aggressive styling kit containing bespoke Pegaso forged wheels and more exposed carbon fiber components.

==== Powertrain and mechanicals ====
The internal combustion variants continue to use the 3.0-litre twin-turbocharged Nettuno V6 engine. Output for the entry-level Modena remains unchanged at 360 kW (490 PS; 483 hp), while the high-performance Trofeo model received a 30 kW (40 hp) power increase to 435 kW (592 PS; 584 hp) achieved through increased turbocharger boost pressure. The 8-speed ZF automatic transmission was also recalibrated for faster gear shifts. Internal combustion models gain a rough-surface driving mode that can hydraulically lift the standard adaptive air suspension by 20 mm (0.79 in) at speeds up to 120 km/h (75 mph).The all-electric Folgore variant retains its tri-motor configuration but introduces a new "Wheel End Disconnect" system that automatically uncouples the front axle during low-load driving conditions to switch from AWD to RWD. Combined with optimized regenerative braking control algorithms, the vehicle's driving range on the WLTP cycle increased to 540 km (336 mi) for the GranTurismo Folgore and 508 km (316 mi) for the GranCabrio Folgore while utilizing the same 92.5 kWh battery pack.
