= Maserati M139 platform =

Fiat rear-wheel drive automobile platform

M139 is a rear-wheel drive automobile platform developed by Maserati for use in a range of vehicles in the Fiat group. It underpins the 2003 Maserati Quattroporte, 2007 Maserati GranTurismo as well as the 2010 Maserati GranCabrio and also forms the basis of the 2007 Alfa Romeo 8C Competizione and Alfa Romeo 8C Spider. It uses four-wheel independent suspension, composed of double wishbones on both axles.

A shorter version of the platform was evaluated to underpin the 2013 SRT Viper, but was not chosen.
