= Project 1221 =

Italian automobile company

Project 1221 is an Italian automobile company. The company began in 2001, originally sub rosa, to develop a new sports car called the MF1 which was to be powered by a Williams zero-emissions gas turbine engine. Two MF1 models were proposed, a two-seat rear-wheel drive version and a three-seat all-wheel drive version with optional armor plating. Both models had a proposed power-to-weight ratio of at least 1,000 hp/ton and a proposed top speed of 270 miles per hour (430 km/h). A lightweight grand tourer model called the "Alleopous" was also announced. It is unclear whether any of these projects progressed beyond the initial design phase. Project 1221 includes ex-Lamborghini and Ferrari engineer Mauro Forghieri and ex-Pininfarina designer Emanuele Nicosia with Andreas Andrianos as its CEO. As of April 2020, the Project 1221 website is no longer active, with the last archived update on the company's activities dated to 18 October 2008.
