= Ferrari Dino engine =

Overview
- Manufacturer: Ferrari
- Production: 1959–2004

Layout
- Configuration: 60°-65° V6; 90° V8
- Displacement: 1.5–4.0 L (91.5–244.1 cu in)
- Cylinder bore: 70–93 mm (2.8–3.7 in)
- Piston stroke: 57–79 mm (2.2–3.1 in)
- Compression ratio: 7.7:1 - 11.2:1

Combustion
- Fuel system: Carburetor/Electronic fuel injection
- Fuel type: Gasoline
- Cooling system: Water-cooled

Output
- Power output: 175–720 PS (129–530 kW; 173–710 hp)
- Torque output: approx. 142–521 lb⋅ft (193–706 N⋅m)

Chronology
- Successor: Ferrari-Maserati F136 engine

The Ferrari Dino engine is a line of mechanically similar V6 and V8 engines produced by Ferrari for about 40 years from the late 1950s into the early 2000s.

The idea for the engine came from Alfredo "Dino" Ferrari, who was the son of Enzo Ferrari. Dino suggested to Enzo Ferrari the development of a V6 engine for F2 at the end of 1955. Soon afterwards, Alfredo fell gravely ill, and he was diagnosed with muscular dystrophy. While hospitalized, he discussed technical details about the engine with a recently hired engineer named Vittorio Jano. Dino would never live to see the engine; he died on June 30, 1956, at the age of 24.

The Dino V6 was Ferrari's first V6 engine. The Dino V8 engine was introduced later; the latter used a flat-plane crankshaft configuration.

== V6 ==
The production Dino V6 began as a discussion between Vittorio Jano and Enzo and Dino Ferrari about the ideal 1.5 L engine for use in the 1957 Formula Two auto racing series. Jano, formerly of Alfa Romeo and Lancia, pressed for a conventional 60° V6 but the Ferraris were open-minded.

=== 60° ===
Jano's 60° design incorporated some of his ideas from the Lancia Aurelia, and were used in a number of Formula One, Formula Two, and Grand Prix cars from 1959 through the early 1960s. Appearing in 1958, it used a 77 mm × 71 mm (3.03 in × 2.80 in) bore and stroke for 1,984 cc (2.0 L) and produced 200 bhp (149 kW; 203 PS) in the 196 S. A larger version was also produced, the 245 bhp (183 kW; 248 PS) 2,417 cc (2.4 L) Dino 246 S. These engines continued in the 1962 Ferrari 196 SP and 286 SP. The latter had a bore and stroke of 90 mm × 75 mm (3.54 in × 2.95 in) for 2,863 cc (2.9 L) and 260 PS (191 kW; 256 hp).

=== 65° ===
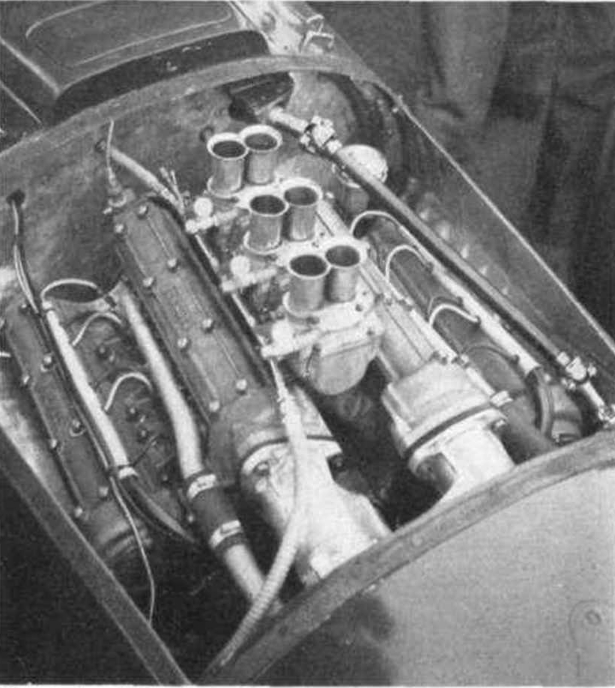
65° V6 in the 1957 Dino 156 F2 s/n 0011 on 28 April 1957.

Ferrari designers began work on the first Dino V6 engine in 1956 and the engine was running by the end of the year. The engine displaced 1,489 cc (1.5 L; 90.9 cu in). This engine was installed in the Dino 156 F2 car and was first raced in the Grand Prix of Naples in April 1957, where it finished in third place behind two Lancia-Ferrari V8 Formula One cars.

The result of the trio's creativity was the world's only 65° V6 engine. The extra 5° between cylinder banks gave Ferrari the straight intakes he wanted. As this engine was not a true V6 but had a separate crankpin for every connecting rod, the crankpins were offset by 55 degrees within every pair of cylinders. This ensured an even firing order for the complete engine as well as an even distance between firing pulses per cylinder bank. Thus the engine was as smoothly running as a conventional 60-degree V6, but had greatly enhanced potential for the design of harmonically balanced exhaust manifolds, giving much better performance. Although the Dino V6 was discontinued with the introduction of the V8 engine in the Dino 308 GT4, the 65° design continues to this day: It reappeared on Ferrari's 1992 456 V12.

The 85 mm × 71 mm (3.35 in × 2.80 in) 2,417 cc (2.4 L; 147.5 cu in) engine used in the 246 S produced 280 PS (276 bhp; 206 kW) with dual overhead camshafts pushing two valves per cylinder. The rear mid-engine, rear-wheel-drive layout 1961 Ferrari 246 SP used this same engine, as did the 246 P F1. A bigger displacement engine (2,962 cc (3.0 L)) with 296 bhp (221 kW; 300 PS) was used for the 1959 Dino 296 S.

The 65° Dino V6 continued in racing after 1962, and made its way to the street as well. The 60° unit was no longer being developed after the SP-series. Ferrari needed to have the engine in 500 production vehicles to homologate it for racing use. The company worked with Fiat to develop a sports car to house it, and the front-engine, rear-wheel-drive layout Fiat Dino project was born.

In competition, the 1965 Dino 166 P used a tiny 1,593 cc (1.6 L; 97.2 cu in) version of the 65° unit. Both bore and stroke were different from the earlier engine at 77 mm × 57 mm (3.03 in × 2.24 in) and output was impressive at 175 PS (129 kW; 173 bhp). Bore was up to 86 mm (3.39 in) for the 218 PS (215 bhp; 160 kW) 1,987 cc (2.0 L; 121.3 cu in) version found that same year in the Dino 206 SP as well as the 1966 Dino 206 S.

In 1968, Ferrari debuted its own Dino 206 GT, the company's first mid-engined road car. It used the 2.0 L engine from the 206 S transversely-mounted between the rear wheels. In compared with racing 206 S version the engine of road 206 GT was detuned to 180 PS (178 bhp; 132 kW). After producing just 152 cars, Ferrari bumped the bore and stroke up from 86 mm × 57 mm (3.39 in × 2.24 in) to 92.5 mm × 60 mm (3.64 in × 2.36 in) for 2,419 cc (2.4 L; 147.6 cu in). This increased power to 195 PS (192 bhp; 143 kW) at 7600 rpm and 226 N⋅m; 166 lbf⋅ft (23 kg⋅m) at 5500 rpm, but the engine block was now made of cast iron rather than aluminium.

The same V6 engine was handed off to Lancia for use in its WRC-champ Stratos in the early 1970s, but Ferrari's Dino street cars had moved on to eight cylinders. The Dino 206 V6 engine also saw a brief return to Formula Two racing in the late seventies after the rules were changed to allow six-cylinder engines, but without any notable success.

Applications:

- 2.0 L
  - 1966–1969 Fiat Dino
  - 1967–1969 Dino 206 GT
- 2.4 L
  - 1969–1973 Fiat Dino
  - 1969–1974 Dino 246 GT and GTS
  - 1973–1975 Lancia Stratos

== V8 ==
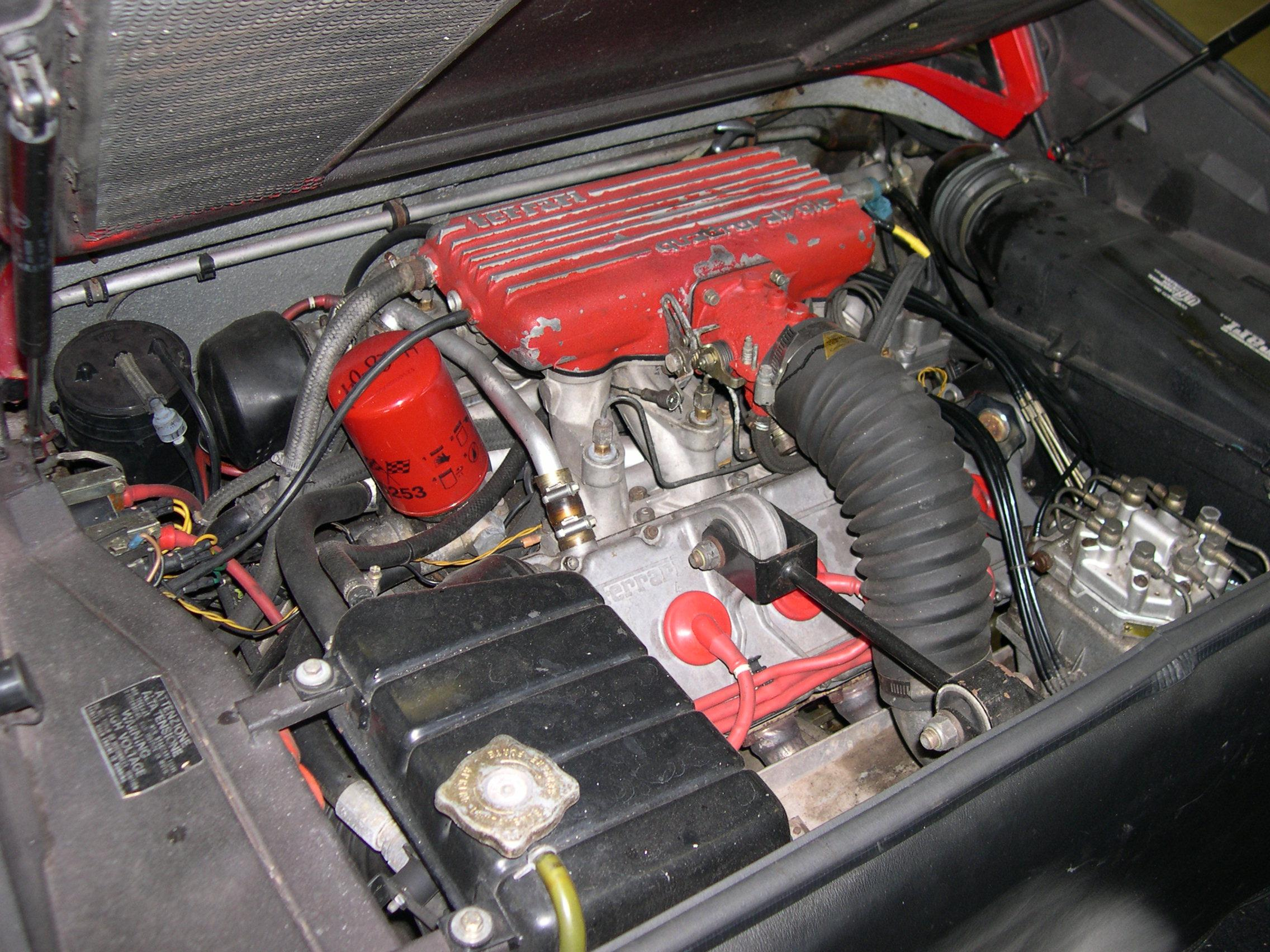
2.9 L Quattrovalvole V8 in a 1984 Ferrari 308 GTB

=== 2.9 ===
The Dino V8, now bored to 81 mm (3.19 in) and the stroke remained at 71 mm (2.80 in), replaced the V6 in the next line of street Dinos to be produced by Ferrari, the 1973 GT4 and 1975 GTB "308" cars. Although the model name suggests 3.0 L, the V8 displaced only 2,927 cc (2.9 L) which rounds down to 2.9 L and was another DOHC 2-valve design.

Applications:

- 1973–1976 308 GT4 (branded "Dino") F106AL
- 1976–1980 308 GT4 (branded "Ferrari") F106AL
- 1975–1980 308 GTB F106AB
- 1977–1980 308 GTS F106AB

==== Fuel injection ====
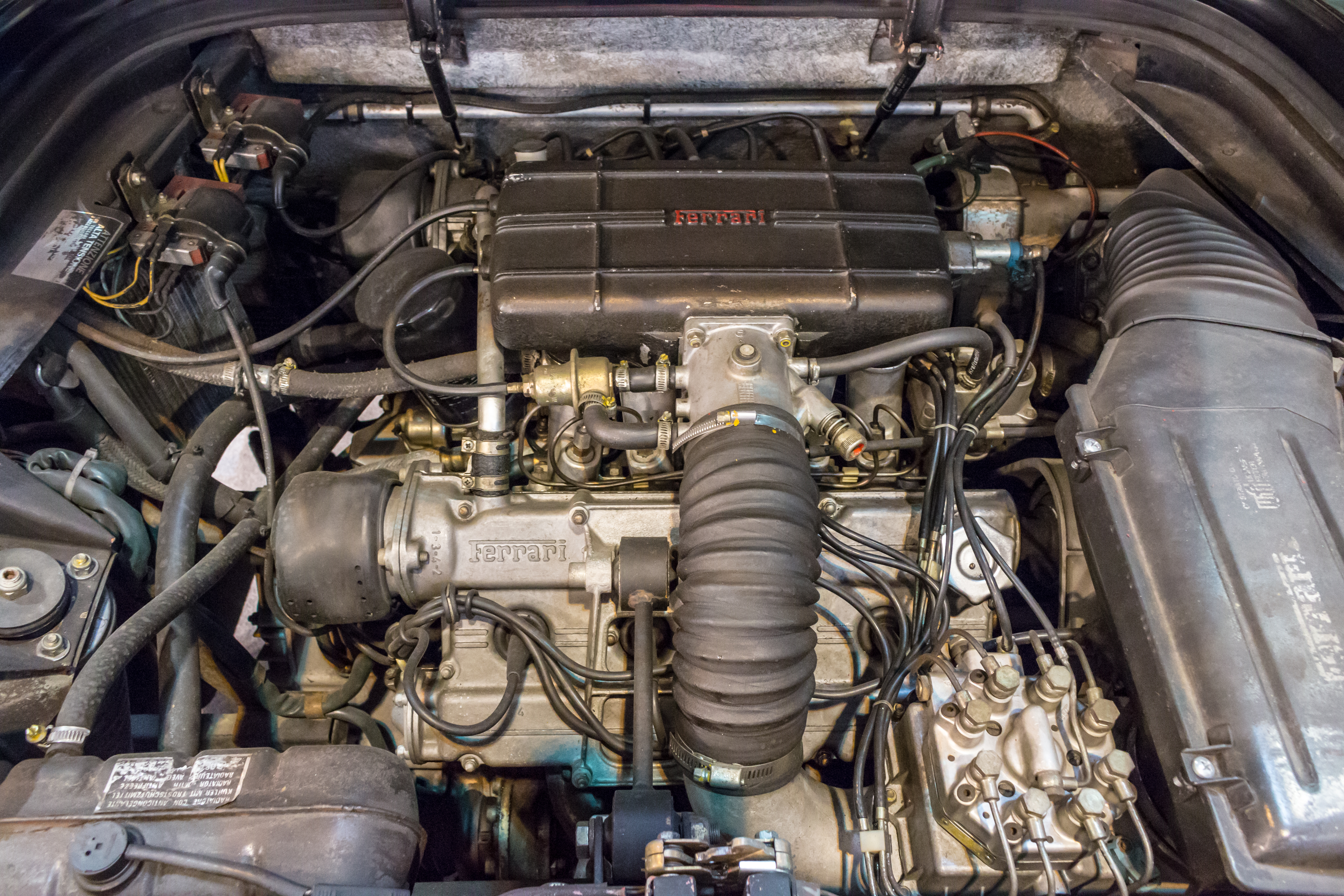
F106B engine

The 1980 "i" models added fuel injection to the existing 2,927 cc (2.9 L) engine.

Applications:

- 1980–1982 Mondial 8 F106B
- 1980–1982 308 GTBi & GTSi F106BB

==== Quattrovalvole ====
4 valves per cylinder were added for the 1982 308 and Mondial Quattrovalvole (or QV), bringing power back up to the pre-FI high of 245 PS (180 kW; 242 bhp).

A very unusual Dino Quattrovalvole was used in the Lancia Thema 8·32. It was based on the 308 QV's engine, but used a cross-plane crankshaft rather than the Ferrari-type flat-plane. The engine was constructed by Ducati rather than Ferrari, and was produced from 1986 through 1991.

The Quattrovalvole was also used by Lancia for their attempt at the World Sportscar Championship with the LC2. The engine was twin-turbocharged and destroked to 2.65 litres, but produced 720 PS (530 kW; 710 bhp) in qualifying trim. The engine was later increased to 3.0 litres and increased power output to 828 PS (609 kW; 817 bhp).

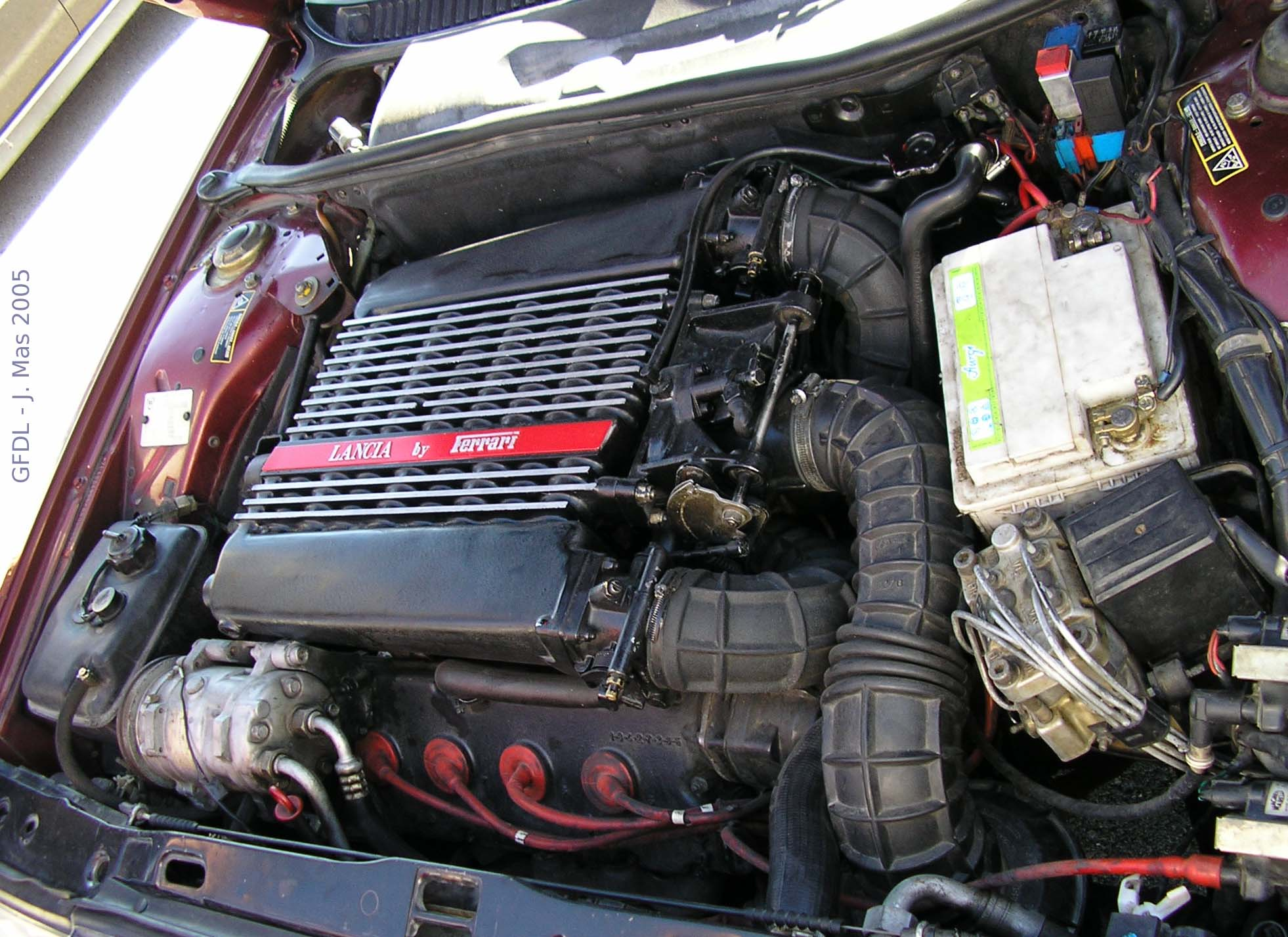
Ferrari V8 in a Lancia Thema 8.32

Applications:

- 1982–1985 308 GTB QV & GTS QV F105AB
- 1982–1985 Mondial QV F105A
- 1986–1991 Lancia Thema 8·32 F105L
- 1983–1991 Lancia LC2

=== 2.0 ===
These small V8 variants were chiefly intended for the domestic market, where cars with engines larger than two-litre incurred in an almost doubled 38% value added tax.

In 1975 the company introduced the Dino 208 GT4. The bore was reduced from 81 to 66.8 mm (3.19 to 2.63 in) but the stroke remained at 71 mm (2.80 in). Output was reduced as well, from 255 to 170 PS (188 to 125 kW; 252 to 168 bhp). Applications:

- 1975–1976 208 GT4 (branded "Dino") F106C
- 1976–1980 208 GT4 (branded "Ferrari") F106C
- 1980–1982 208 GTB F106CB
- 1980–1982 208 GTS F106CB

==== Turbocharged ====
1982 saw the introduction of the 208 Turbo. The 208 Turbo featured 220 PS (162 kW; 217 bhp), more than the fuel injected 308 from the previous year. Except for the non-intercooled 208 Turbo engine, all the forced induction F1 and road engines from 1980 to 1989 were designed and developed by Nicola Materazzi due to his experience with fuels, engines, combustion, turbo, and Comprex which he had accumulated in his career with Mobil, Lancia, and Osella.

Applications:

- 1982–1985 208 GTB Turbo F106D
- 1982–1985 208 GTS Turbo F106D
- 1986–1989 GTB Turbo F106N
- 1986–1989 GTS Turbo F106N
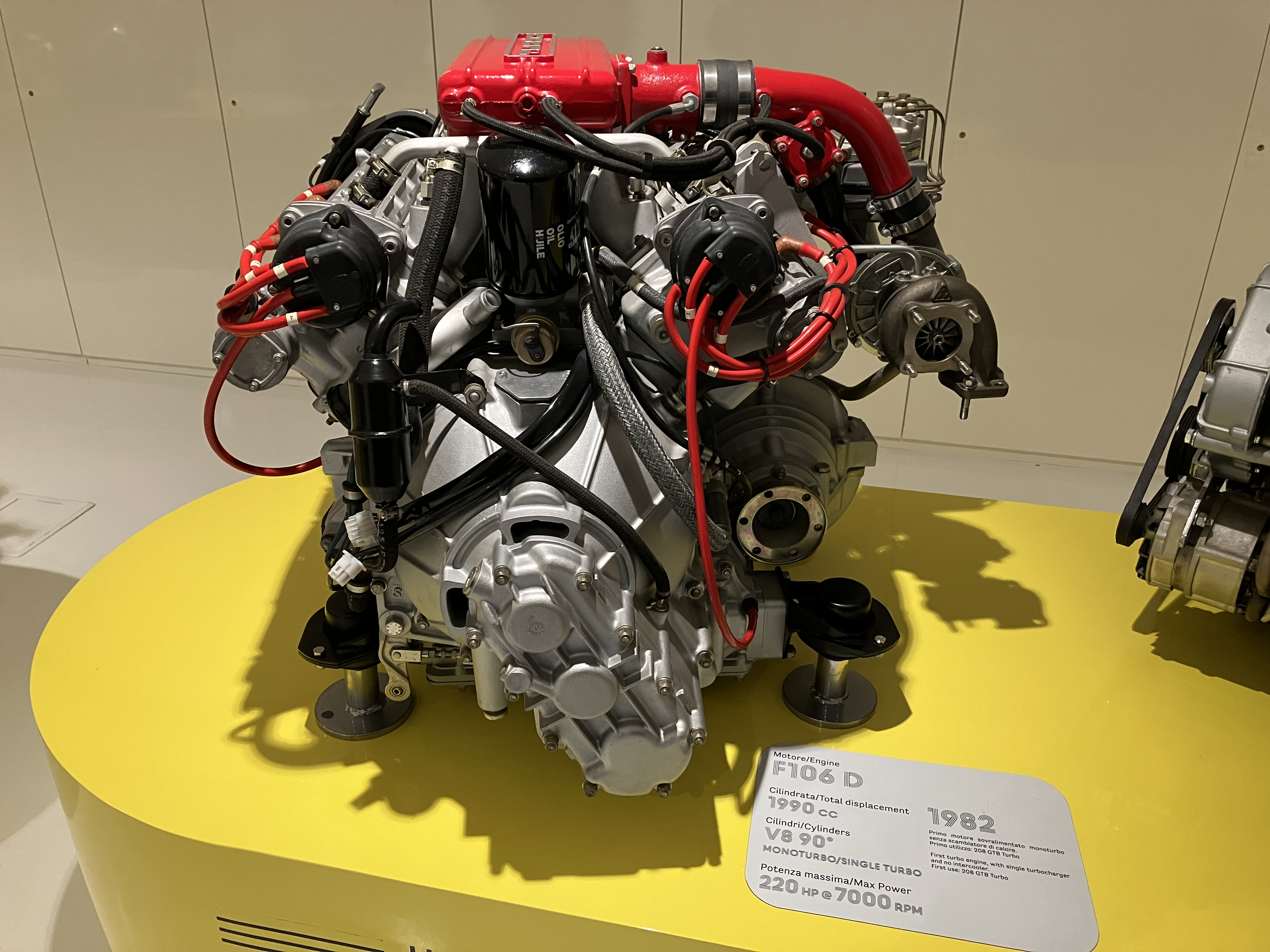
F106D engine (1982)

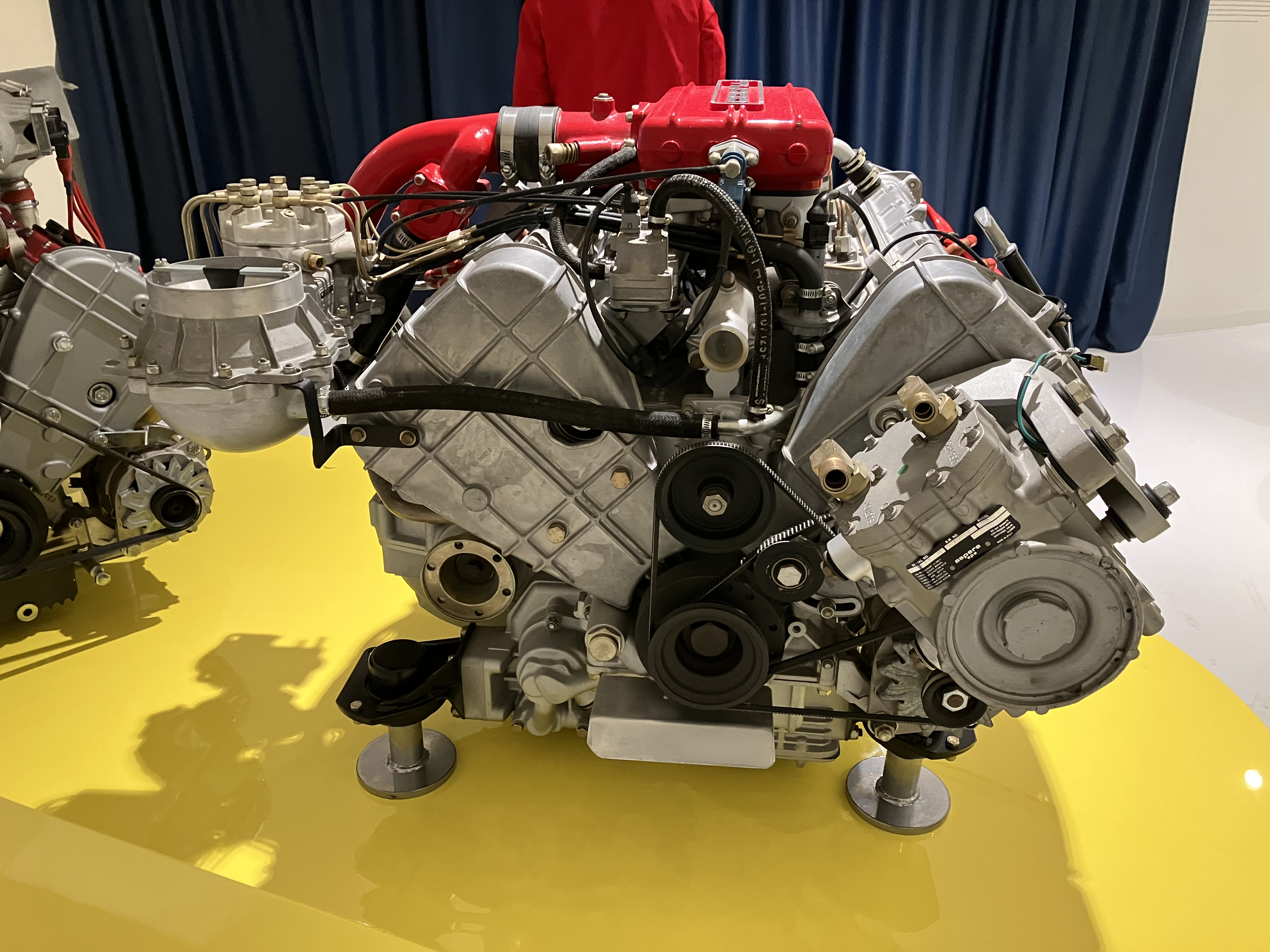

=== 288 GTO ===
The turbo also served as a development platform for the forthcoming 1984 288 GTO sports car. That famous Ferrari was meant for Group B racing, with a 2,855 cc (2.9 L) version of the 308's engine (bore was down by 1 mm (0.04 in) to meet the regulations of the class). With IHI twin-turbochargers, a Behr intercooler, and Weber-Marelli fuel injection, the GTO boasted 400 PS (294 kW; 395 bhp) from Dino's engine.

Applications:

- 1984–1985 Ferrari 288 GTO (Designer: Nicola Materazzi)

=== 3.2 ===
The 1985 328 and 3.2 Mondial used a bored and stroked 3.0 QV V8 to 83 mm × 73.6 mm (3.27 in × 2.90 in) version called the Tipo F105CB. That naturally aspirated 3,186 cc (3.2 L) engine boasted 270 PS (199 kW; 266 bhp).

Applications:

- 1985–1989 328 GTB & GTS
- 1985–1989 3.2 Mondial

=== F117 ===
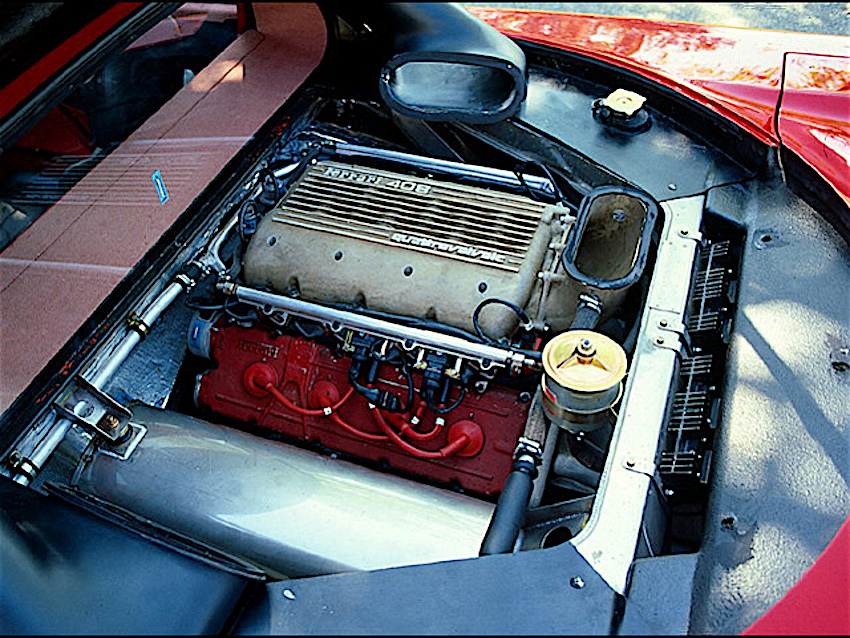
4-litre F117 engine in the Ferrari 408 4RM.

Two prototype Ferrari 408 4RMs from 1987 and 1988 used a 90° rear and longitudinally mounted 4.0 litre (3,999.7 cc) V8 that produces 221 kW (296 hp; 300 PS) at 6,250 rpm and 373 N⋅m (275 lb⋅ft) of torque at 4500 rpm. The engine has a compression ratio of 9.8: 1 and a bore and stroke of 93 mm and 73.6 mm respectively, bringing total displacement to 3 999.66 cm³ (4.0 L). The engine also features double overhead camshafts with four valves per cylinder, as well as Weber-Marelli fuel injection and dry sump lubrication.

A transverse mounted transaxle version of the engine called the F117A was built and tested by Ferrari as a possible option for the upcoming 348 but was decided against due to Ferrari's preference for smaller displacement high revving engines. A twin turbocharged version was also reportedly tested, producing 450 PS (331 kW; 444 hp) at 6800 rpm and 510 N⋅m (376 lb⋅ft) of torque at 4000 rpm.

=== F120A ===
In 1987, the F40 sports car debuted with the Tipo F120A engine. The 2.9 L (2,936.25 cc) Dino-based engine now had a bore x stroke of 82 mm × 69.5 mm (3.23 in × 2.74 in) and 16 psi (1.1 bar) of turbo boost for 351.5 kW (478 PS; 471 hp) at 7000 rpm and 577 N⋅m (426 lbf⋅ft) of torque at 4000 rpm while the US designated engines, code named the Tipo F120 D were rated at 356 kW (484 PS; 477 hp).

Applications:

- 1987–1992 F40 (Designer: Nicola Materazzi)
  F120 A at the Museo Casa Enzo Ferrari
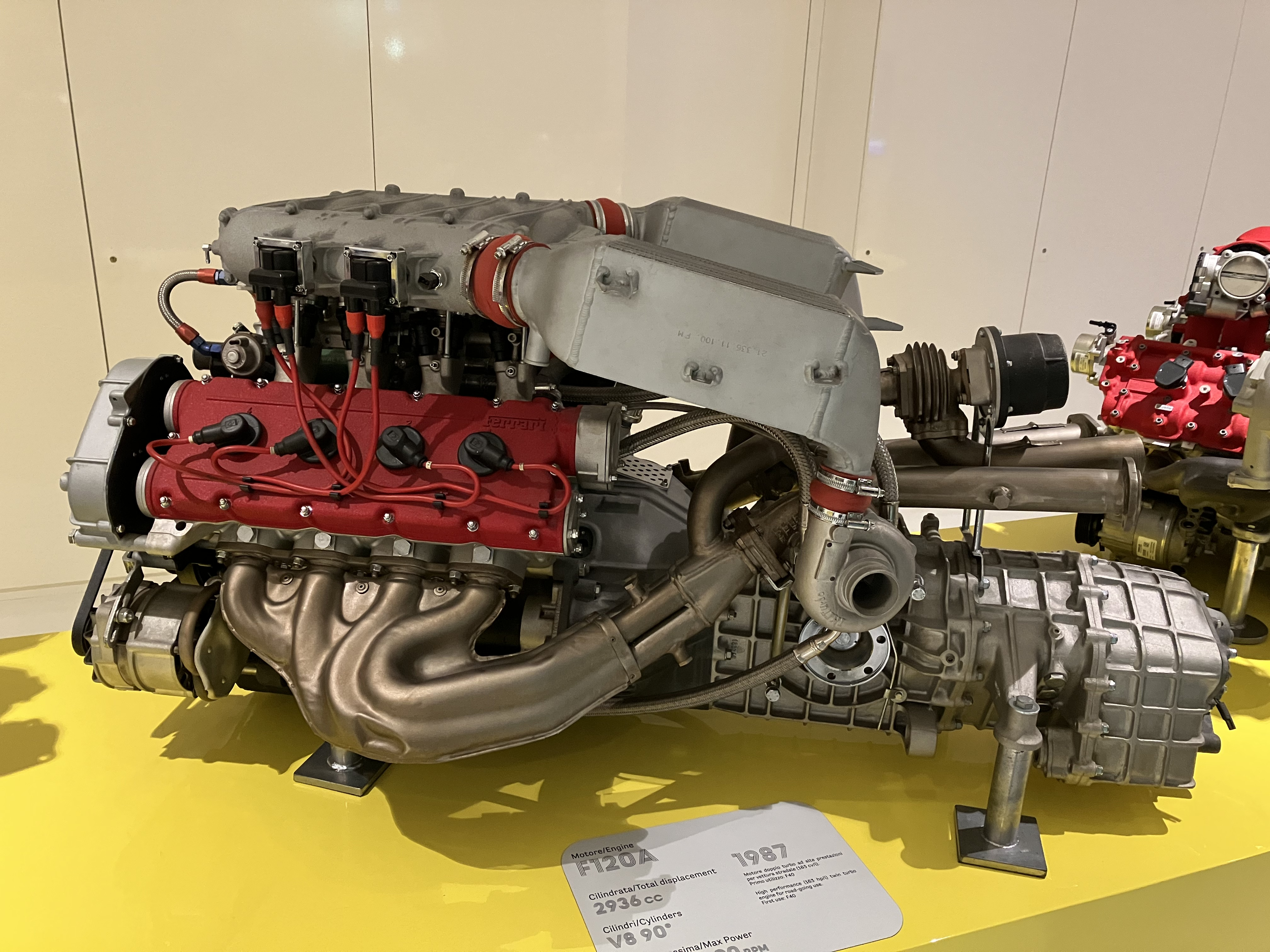
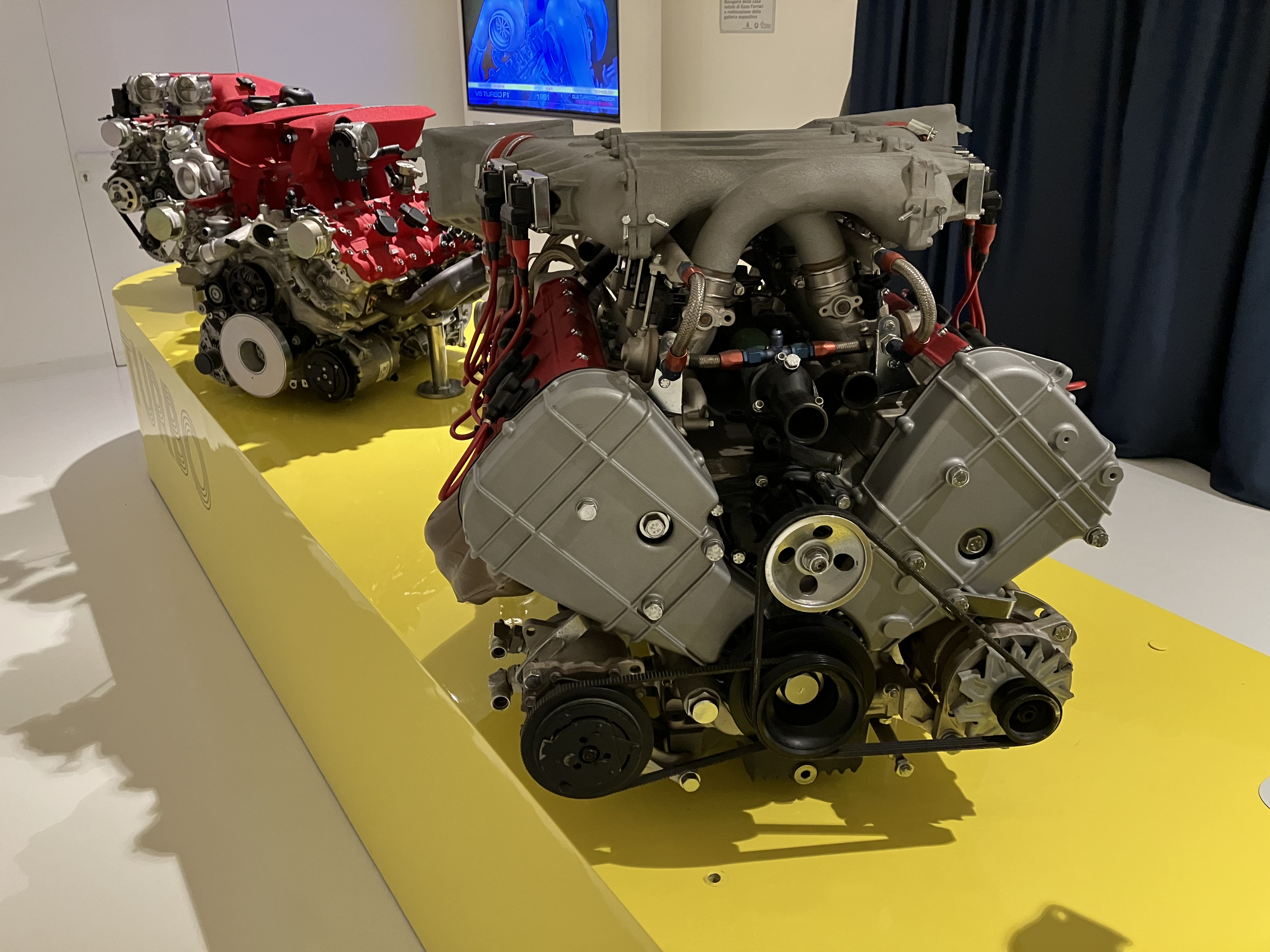
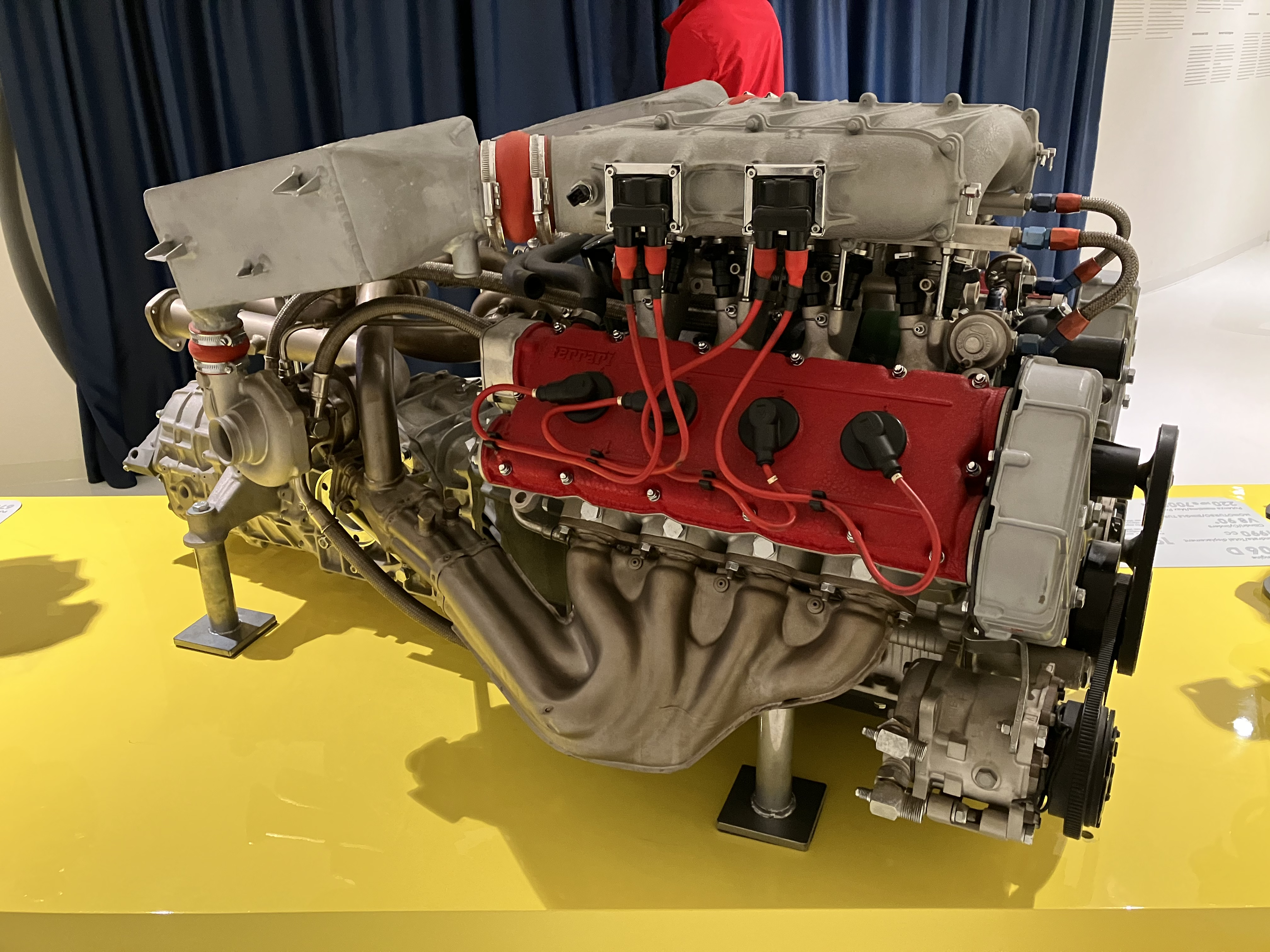

=== F120B ===
The Tipo F120 B, used in the Ferrari F40 LM, retained the same displacement as the F120A, but the output of the IHI turbochargers was upped to 2.6 bar (38 psi) and the compression ratio was increased to 8.0:1 for 720 hp (540 kW; 730 PS) at 7500 rpm.

Applications:

- 1989-1996 Ferrari F40 LM (Designer: Nicola Materazzi)

=== 3.4 ===
The 1989 introduction of the 348 and Mondial t saw the Dino V8 pushed to 3.4 L (3,405 cc) with a bore x stroke of 85 mm × 75 mm (3.35 in × 2.95 in). Power was up to 300 PS (296 bhp; 221 kW) in the Tipo F119D/G, and revised as the Tipo F119H with 320 PS (316 bhp; 235 kW) in later Ferrari 348s.

Applications:

- Tipo F119D & Tipo F119G
  - 1989–1993 348 tb & ts
  - 1989–1993 Mondial t
  - 1993–1994 348 GTB, GTS & Spider
- Tipo F119H
  - 1994 348 GTC

=== 3.5 ===
The 1994 F355 included their first production 5-valve engine, and sported a 2 mm (0.08 in) longer stroke for 3.5 L (3,496 cc) and 380 PS (375 bhp; 279 kW). This Tipo F129B was used from 1994 through 1998. It was revised as the Tipo F129C, debuting in 1998 and used through 1999.

Applications:

- Tipo F129B
  - 1994–1998 F355 GTB & GTS
  - 1995–1998 F355 Spider
- Tipo F129C
  - 1998–1999 F355 GTB, GTS & Spider
  - 1998–1999 355 F1 GTB, GTS & Spider
F129B at the Museo Casa Enzo Ferrari

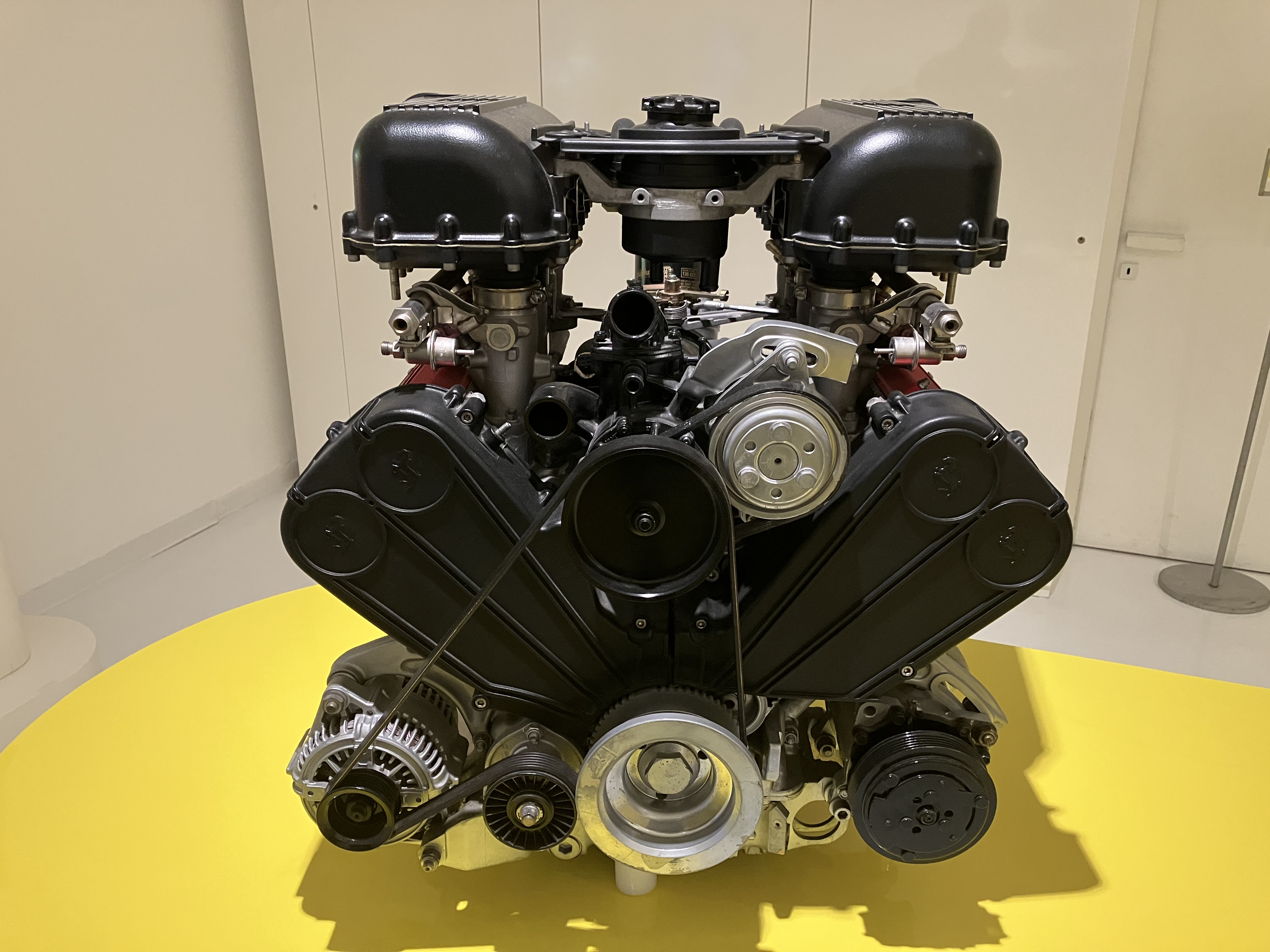

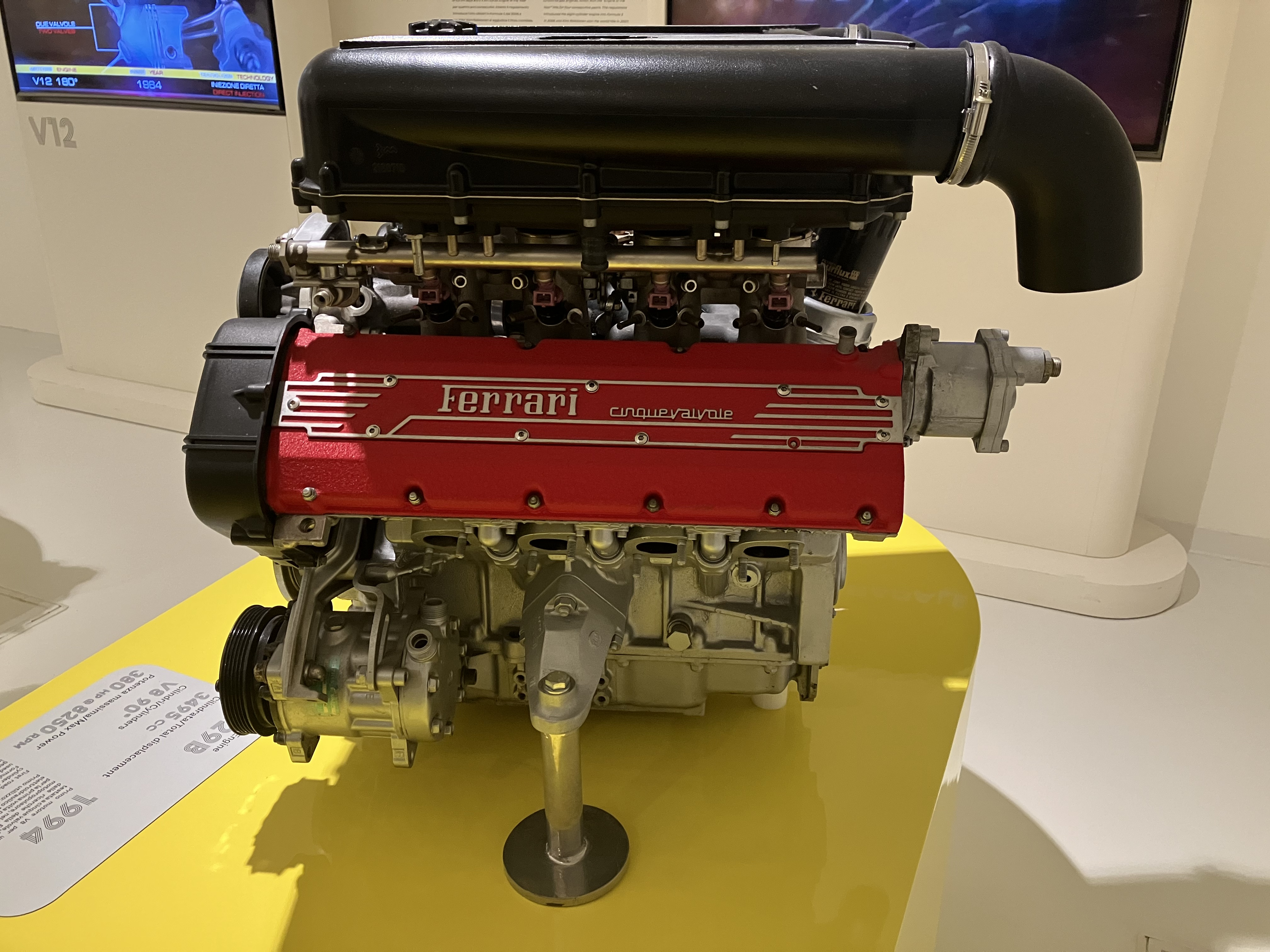

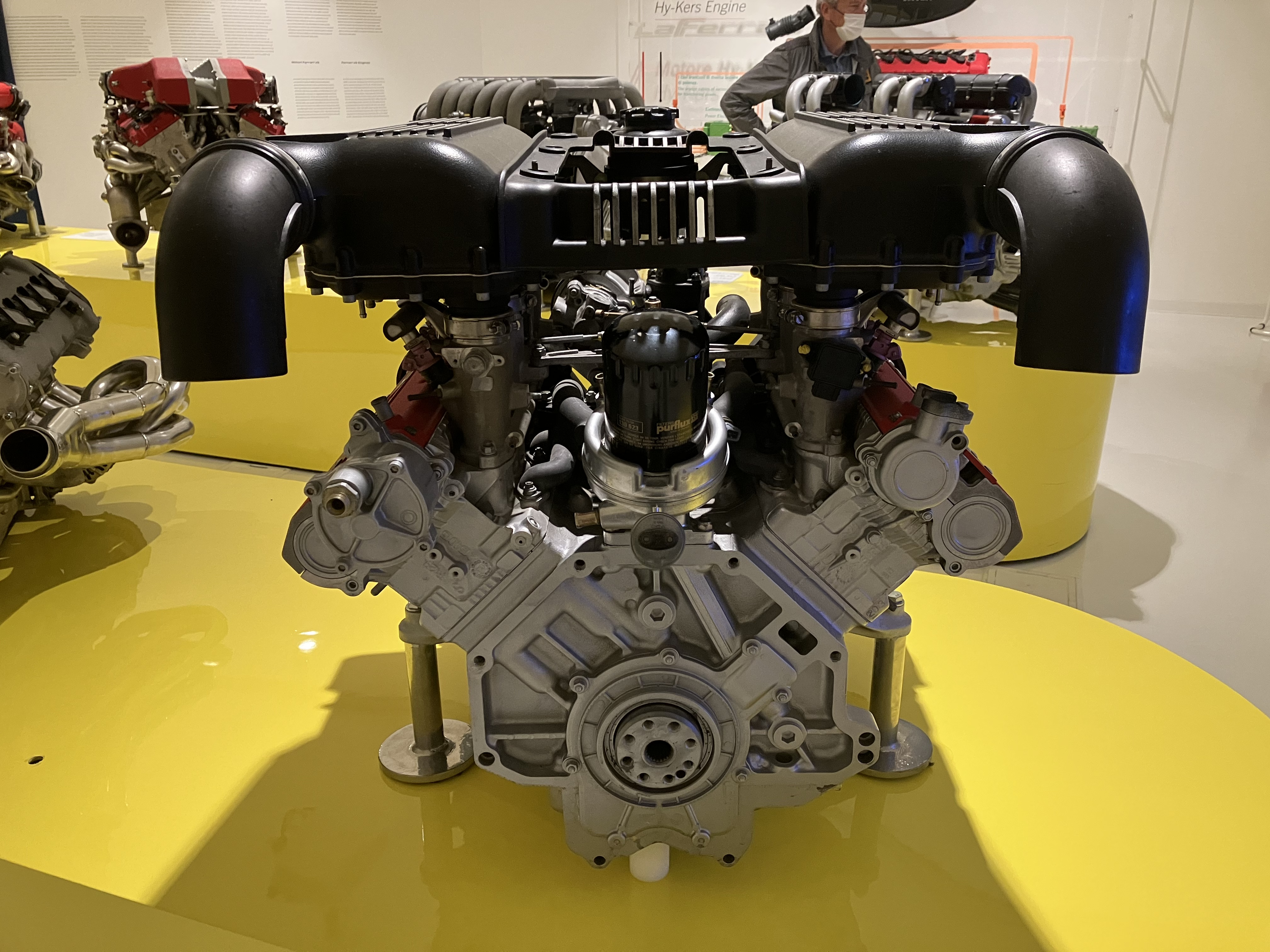

=== 3.6 ===
The 1999 360 Modena retained the 85 mm (3.35 in) bore of the F355 engine and the 5-valve per cylinder layout, but increased the stroke to 79 mm (3.11 in), to raise the displacement again to 3.6 L (3,586 cc) and 400 PS (395 bhp; 294 kW). Modifications to the intake/exhaust and an increased 11.2:1 compression ratio produced 425 PS (419 bhp; 313 kW) for the 360 Challenge Stradale. This Tipo F131 was produced from 1999 through 2004.

Applications:

- 1999–2004 360 Modena
- 2000–2005 360 Spider
- 2003 Challenge Stradale
- 2026 Ælla-60
F131 B at the Museo Casa Enzo Ferrari

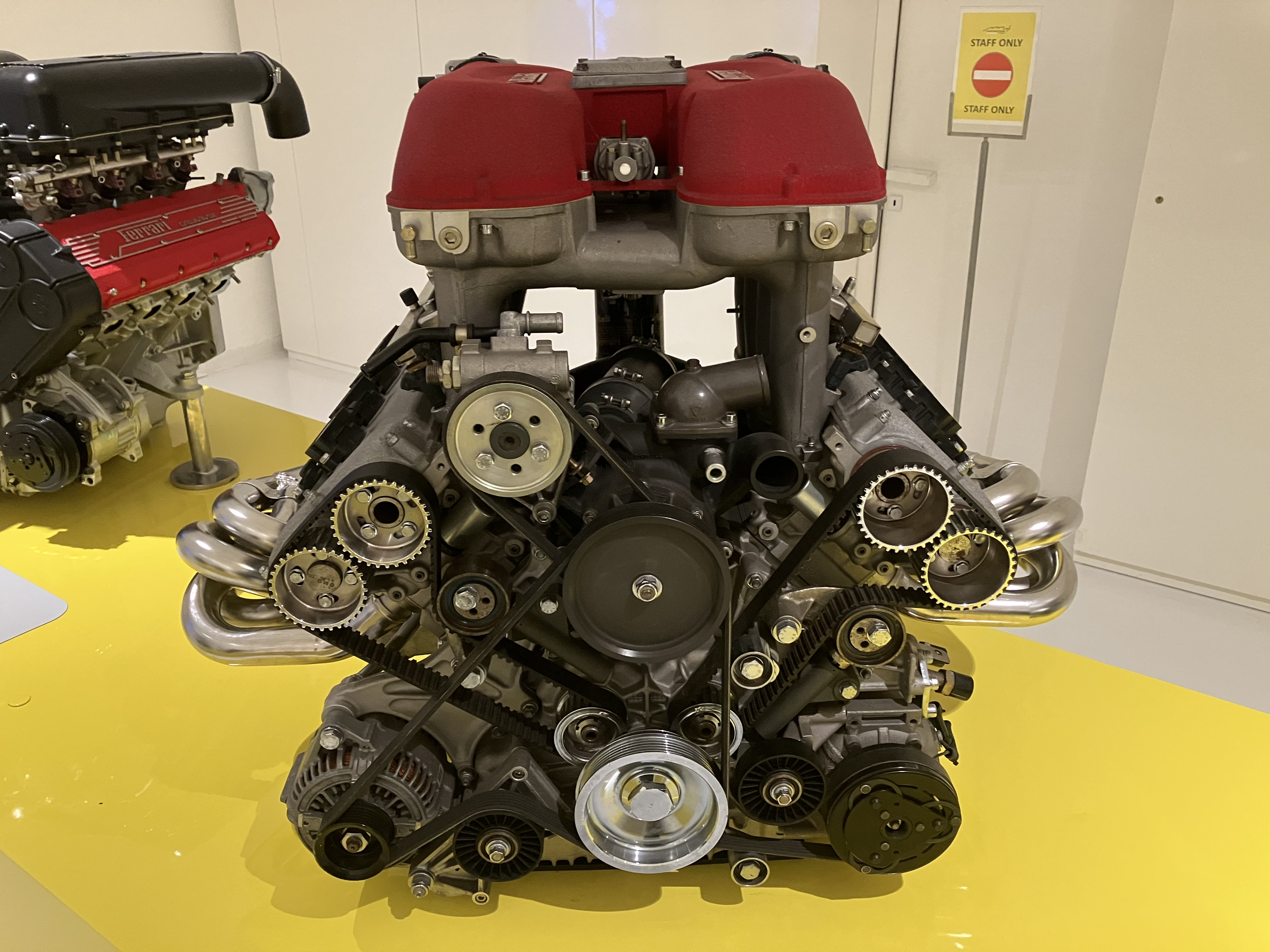

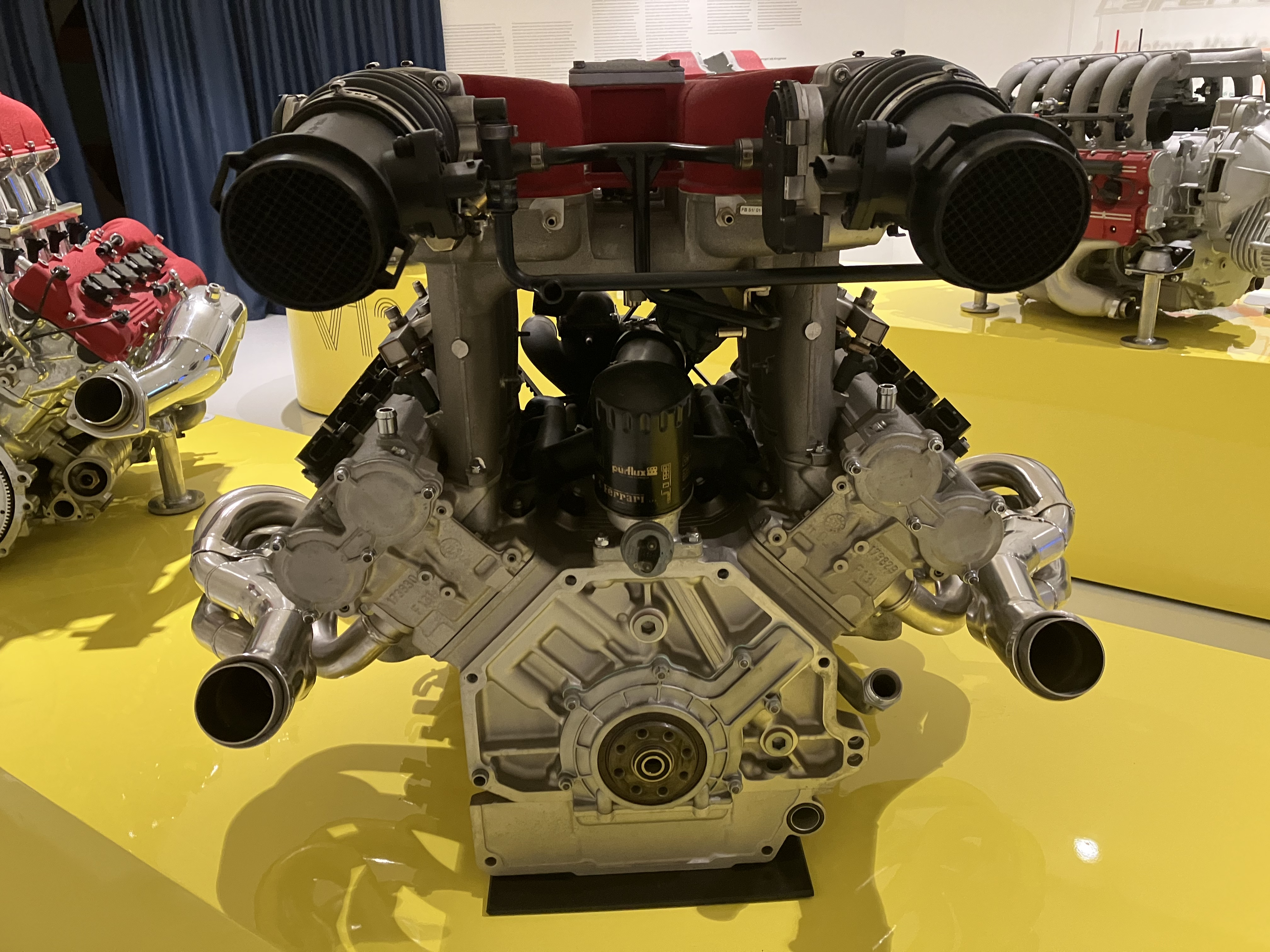

The Dino V8 was retired in 2004 with the introduction of the new Ferrari-Maserati F136 engine used in the Ferrari F430.

== V12 ==
A new V12 engine family debuted in the 1992 456 as the Tipo F116. It featured the Dino 65° V angle with an 88 mm bore and the same 75 mm stroke as the Dino V8 found in the 348, that was produced at the time of introduction.

It was then revised again as the "Tipo F133" and used in the front engined 550 (5.5 litre) and later in 575M Maranello and 612 Scaglietti (5.75 litre).

== See also ==
- List of Ferrari engines
