= Ferrari 408 4RM =

Mid-engine, four-wheel drive prototype car developed by Ferrari

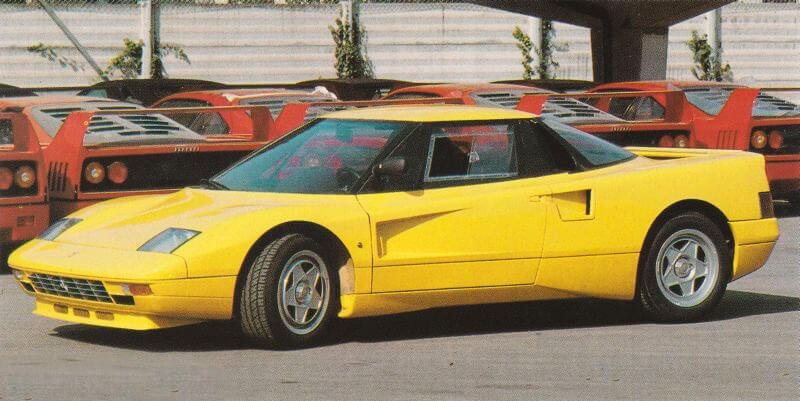
- The second prototype of the Ferrari 408 4RM s/n 78610 in front of a lineup of Ferrari F40s

Overview
- Manufacturer: Ferrari
- Production: 1987–1988; 2 prototypes made

Body and chassis
- Layout: Mid-engine, four-wheel-drive layout

Powertrain
- Engine: 4.0 L (3,999.7 cc) Tipo F117 DOHC V8
- Power output: 221 kW (296 hp; 300 PS)
- Transmission: 5-speed manual

Dimensions
- Wheelbase: 2,550 mm (100.4 in)
- Length: 4,220 mm (166.1 in)
- Width: 1,885 mm (74.2 in)
- Height: 1,200 mm (47.2 in)
- Curb weight: 1,343 kg (2,960.8 lb) (with liquids)

The Ferrari 408 4RM is a prototype car built by Ferrari in 1987. It was the first Ferrari to feature 4-wheel drive. The model name was linked to the characteristics of the engine, with the 40 in 408 standing for its 4.0 L displacement, and the 8 representing the number of cylinders. The abbreviation "4RM" stood for “4 Ruote Motrici”, meaning four-wheel drive.

== History ==
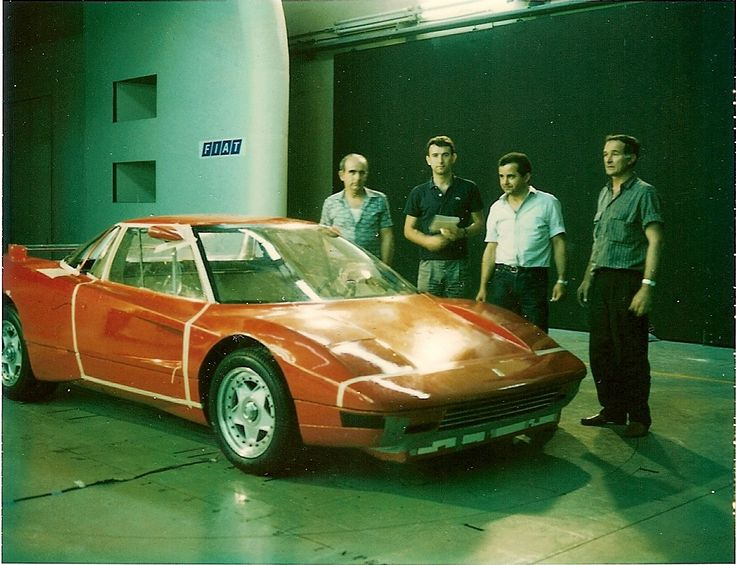
The first 408 4RM was red, s/n 70183

the 408 4RM project, led by Mauro Forghieri, aimed to explore new design ideas for Ferrari's road cars. The car featured a hydraulic four-wheel-drive system developed by Ferrari, and was the first Ferrari to feature 4-wheel drive. The system used a center differential mated to a hydraulic coupling, connected to shafts driving the front and rear differentials, with torque biased 29 percent to the front wheels and 71 percent to the rear. In 1991, Ferrari deemed that the system was not suited to the company's philosophy, stating that it increased the weight of the car by 200 kg (441 lb). The 408 remained as the only Ferrari to use 4-wheel drive until the Ferrari FF, introduced in 2011, which became the first production Ferrari with 4 wheel drive. The FF also uses a system called "4RM", which is said to be more technologically advanced and lighter than the system in the 408, and its unclear whether it shares any of its design with the 408. The 408 4RM also featured composite body panels and a cast magnesium front bulkhead. The suspension was an all independent parallel wishbone design that used identical uprights and wishbones on all 4 corners. The suspension also featured hydraulic rams that allowed for automatic or manual adjustment of the suspension height. When tested in a wind tunnel at its lowest suspension height, the car achieved a drag coefficient of 0.274. Other unique features include a single pivot windshield wiper and a self inflating door seal.

Two copies were built. The first one, chassis no. 70183, was painted in red and was fitted with an all-steel welded chassis, made from folded sheets of stainless steel instead of stampings, and was built in June 1987. The second one, chassis no 78610, was painted yellow and had an aluminum frame bonded with adhesives, co-developed with Alcan. The second car was completed in September 1988 and has been exhibited at the Galleria Ferrari in Maranello.

The 408 4RM was featured on the cover of Road & Track in December 1988.

== Performance ==
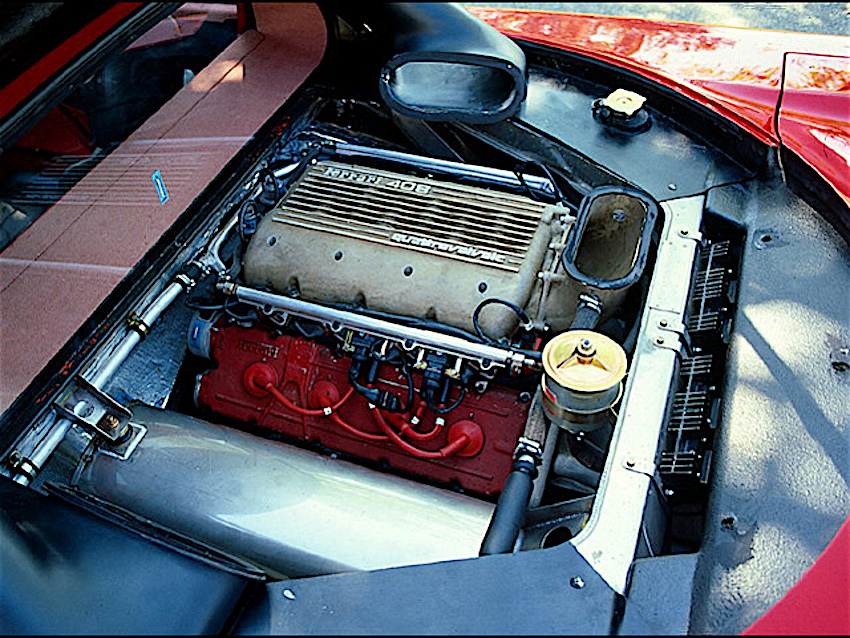
4-litre V8 of the 1987-model 408.

The 408 4RM is powered by a 90° rear and longitudinally mounted 4.0 litre F117 V8 that produces 221 kW (296 hp; 300 PS) at 6,250 rpm and 373 N⋅m (275 lb⋅ft) of torque at 4500 rpm. The engine has a compression ratio of 9.8: 1, and a bore and stroke of 93 mm and 73.6 mm respectively, bringing total displacement to 3 999.66 cm³ (4.0 L). The engine also features double overhead camshafts with four valves per cylinder, as well as Weber-Marelli fuel injection and dry sump lubrication. The engine was offset slightly to the right in the engine bay to make room for the 5-speed manual transmission. At its lowest suspension setting, it was estimated that it could reach a top speed of 192 mph (309 km/h).
