= Ferrari 348 =

V8 sports car manufactured by Ferrari

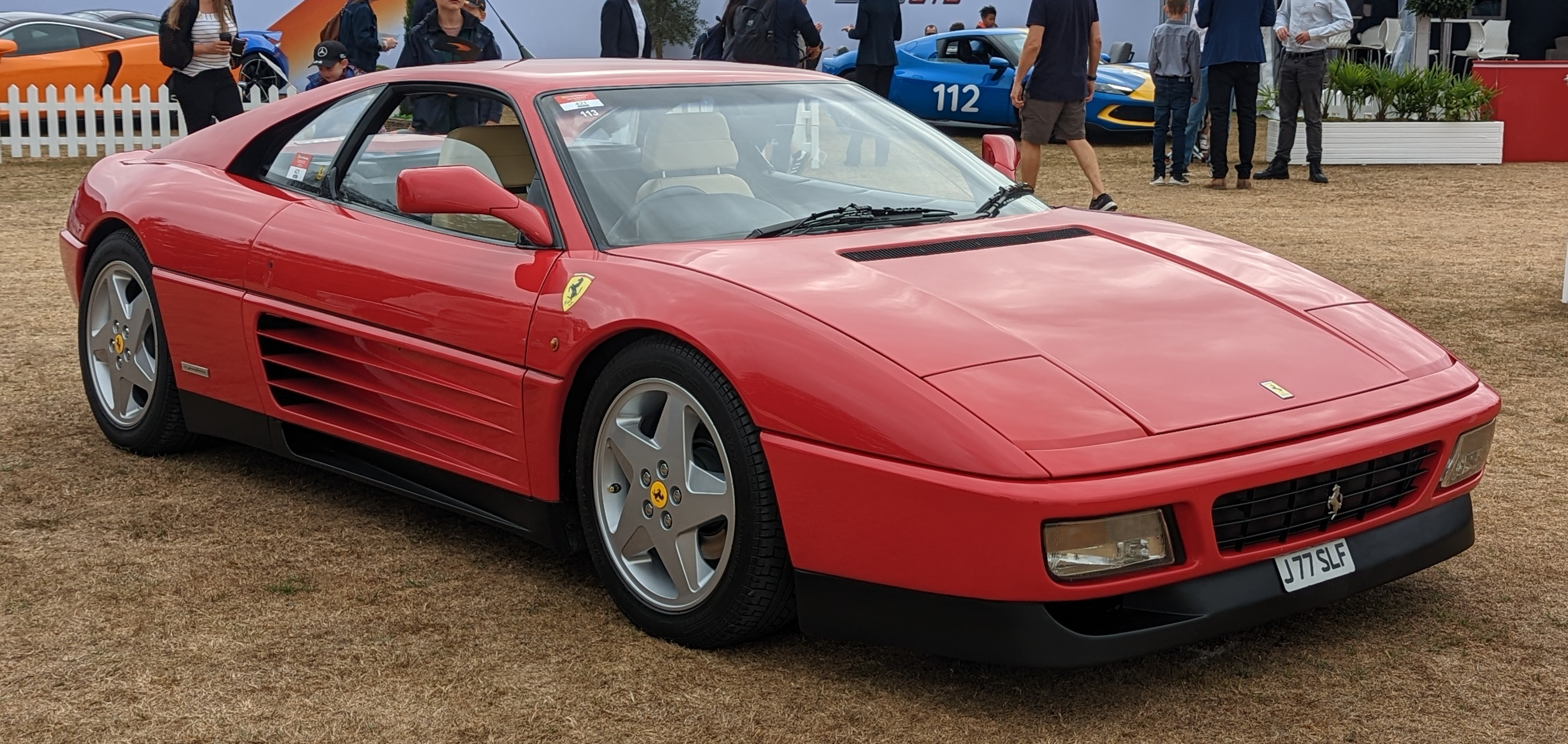
- Ferrari 348 tB

Overview
- Manufacturer: Ferrari
- Production: 1989–1994; 8,844 produced
- Assembly: Italy: Maranello
- Designer: Leonardo Fioravanti at Pininfarina

Body and chassis
- Class: Sports car (S)
- Body style: 2-door Berlinetta (tb, GTB); 2-door targa top (ts, GTS); 2-door convertible (Spider)
- Layout: Longitudinal, rear mid-engine, rear-wheel-drive

Powertrain
- Engine: 3.4 L Tipo F119 V8
- Transmission: 5-speed manual

Dimensions
- Wheelbase: 2,450 mm (96.5 in)
- Length: 4,230 mm (167 in)
- Width: 1,894 mm (74.6 in)
- Height: 1,170 mm (46.1 in)
- Kerb weight: 1,500 kg (3,300 lb)

Chronology
- Predecessor: Ferrari 328
- Successor: Ferrari F355

The Ferrari 348 (Type F119) is a mid-engined, V8-powered, two-seat sports car produced by Italian automaker Ferrari, replacing the 328 in 1989 and remaining in production until mid-1994, when it was replaced by the F355. It was the final V8 model developed under the direction of Enzo Ferrari before his death, commissioned to production posthumously.

== Variants ==
=== 348 tb, ts ===
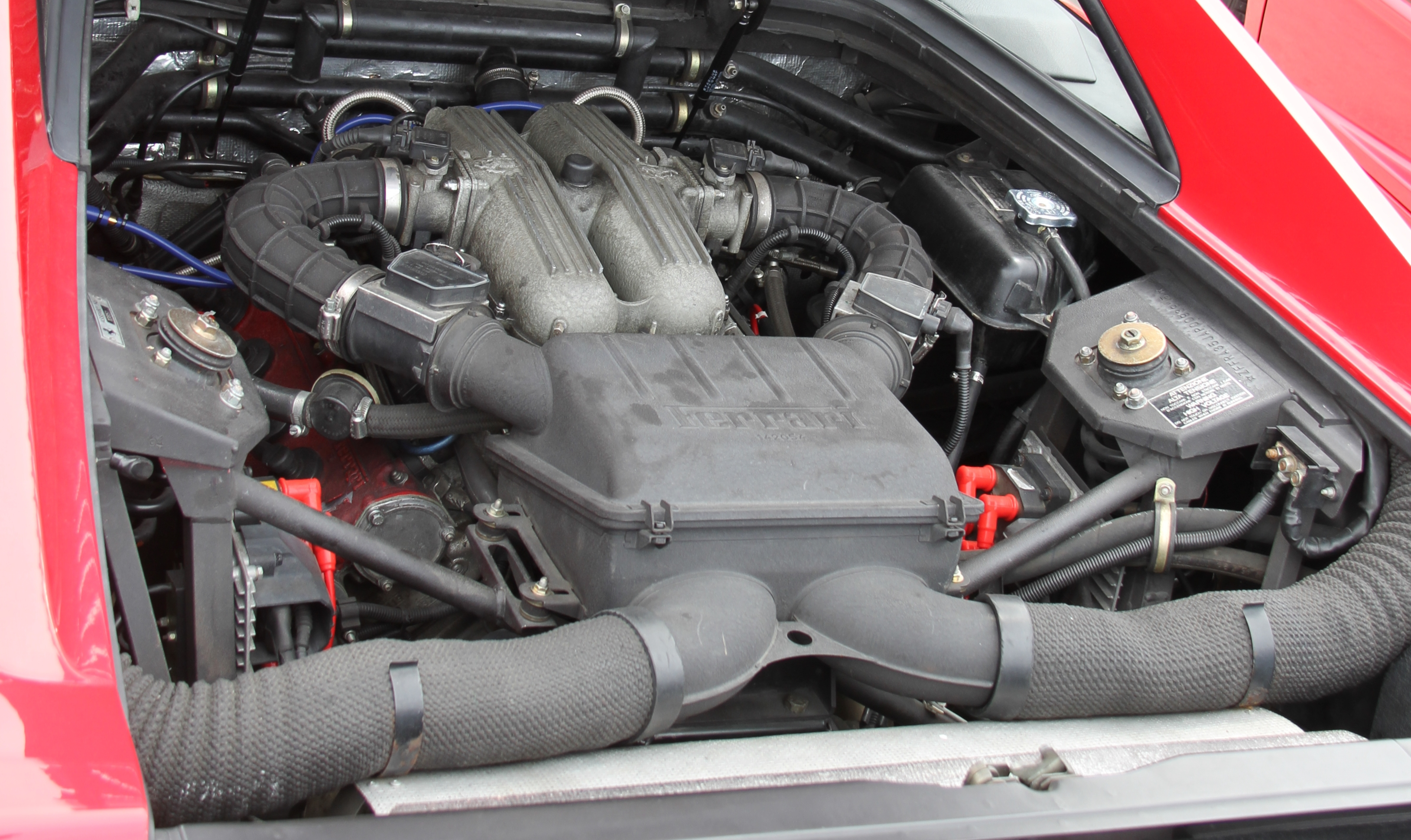
The 3.4L Tipo F119 V8 engine

The 348, badged 348 tb for the coupé (Trasversale Berlinetta) and 348 ts for the targa (Trasversale Spider), featured a naturally aspirated 3.4-litre version of the quad-cam, four-valve-per-cylinder V8 engine. As with its predecessors, the model number was derived from this configuration, with the first two digits being the displacement of the engine and the third being the number of cylinders. The engine, which had a power output of 300 PS (221 kW; 296 hp), was mounted longitudinally and coupled to a transverse manual gearbox. This marked the first street Ferrari application of the transverse gearbox design, originally developed for the Ferrari 312T F1 car. The "t" in the model tb and ts designations refers to the transverse position of the gearbox, which Ferrari sought to highlight for the model range, celebrating this technical lineage. This was the also the first time Ferrari featured a mid-engined, longitudinal V8 in one of its standard road cars, after the 288 GTO. Overall, 2,894 examples of the 348 TB and 4,228 of the 348 TS were produced.

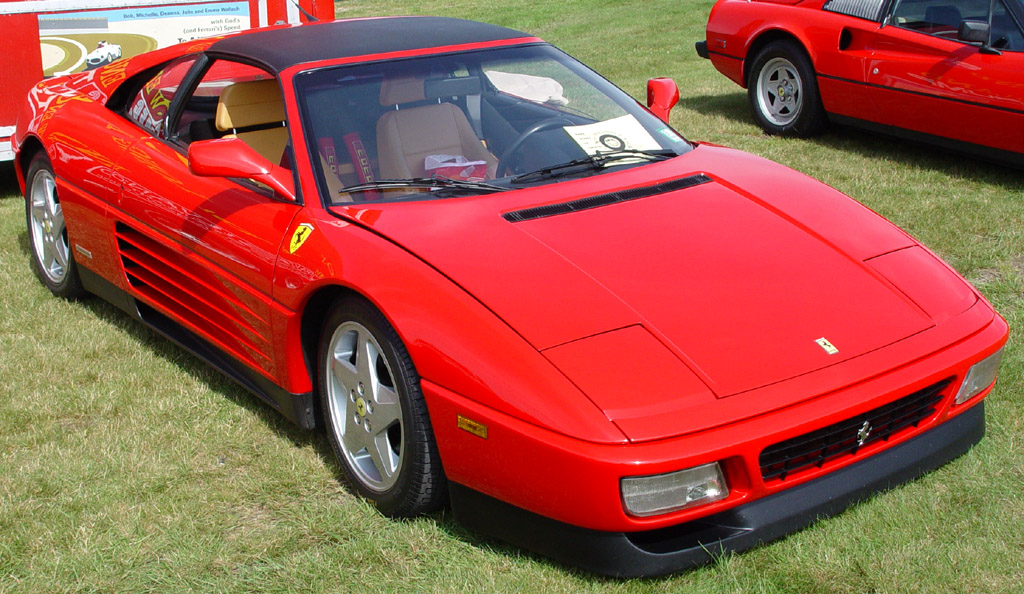
Ferrari 348 TS (pre-facelift model)

The 348's styling differed from previous models with straked side air intakes and rectangular taillights resembling the Testarossa, stylistic themes reminiscent of the F40, the world's fastest production car at the time, and other Ferrari models of the past. The model was also the final design overseen by chief stylist Leonardo Fioravanti, known for such designs as the F40, Daytona, 512 Berlinetta Boxer, 288 GTO, P5, P6 and others. The F355 that succeeded the 348 returned to the styling cues of the 328 with round tail lights and rounded side air scoops.

The 348 was fitted with dual-computer engine management using twin Bosch Motronic ECUs, double-redundant anti-lock brakes, and self-diagnosing air conditioning and heating systems. In 1990, the Bosch Motronic engine management system was updated from the 2.5 to the 2.7 version. Later versions of the 348 (1993 and beyond) have Japanese starter motors and Nippondenso power generators to improve reliability, as well as the battery located within the front left fender for better weight distribution.

All 348s have OBD-I engine management systems, though European and general market variants do not come with the self-test push button installed, which is needed to activate this troubleshooting feature. Similar to the Testarossa but departing from the 512 BB and 308/328, the oil and coolant radiators were relocated from the nose to the sides, widening the side of the car substantially, but making the cabin much easier to cool since hoses routing warm water no longer ran underneath the cabin as in the older front-radiator cars. This also had the side effect of making the doors very wide.

The 348 was equipped with a dry sump oil system to prevent oil starvation at high speeds and during hard cornering. The oil level could only be accurately checked on the dipstick when the engine was running due to this setup. The 348 was fitted with adjustable ride-height suspension and a removable rear sub-frame to speed up the removal of the engine for maintenance.

=== 348 Serie Speciale ===
Between 1992 and 1993, Ferrari made 100 limited edition units of the 348 Serie Speciale of its tb and ts versions. It was only made for the US market. The main technical modifications consisted in a revised engine which produced 316 PS (232 kW; 312 hp) at 7,200 rpm, a wider rear track (50mm), a free-flow exhaust system, a shorter ratio final drive and Pirelli P Zero tyres. Ferrari indicated a 0–97 km/h acceleration time of 5.3 seconds and a standing ¼ mile of 13.75 seconds.

Several modifications were made to the exterior as well: new front spoiler to optimize aerodynamics similar to the F40, new front grille with the chrome prancing horse, bumpers and rocker panels in body colour, engine cover in body colour, modified taillight assembly and new rear grille with the chrome prancing horse.

The cars were offered with F40 style sport seats in Connolly leather with the regular seats included as an option. The door panels were also modified and made of leather. Each car was numbered (1 to 100), with a 348 Serie Speciale plaque on the passenger's side door-post.

=== 348 Challenge ===
The Ferrari Challenge was designated for the Ferrari 348; the series debuted in 1993 and included the Italian and European series. The engine used in the participating cars was similar to the road going GT models introduced in the same year with the only noticeable changes being the slick tyres, new body kit, better brake-pads, roll-bar, smaller battery in a different position and seat belts. In 1994 the G-spec engined cars had to be modified with the H-spec cylinder heads and injection system. The cars were mostly modified by dealers by installing factory supplied Challenge kits. The car's final season was in 1995 and was replaced subsequently by the F355 Challenge.

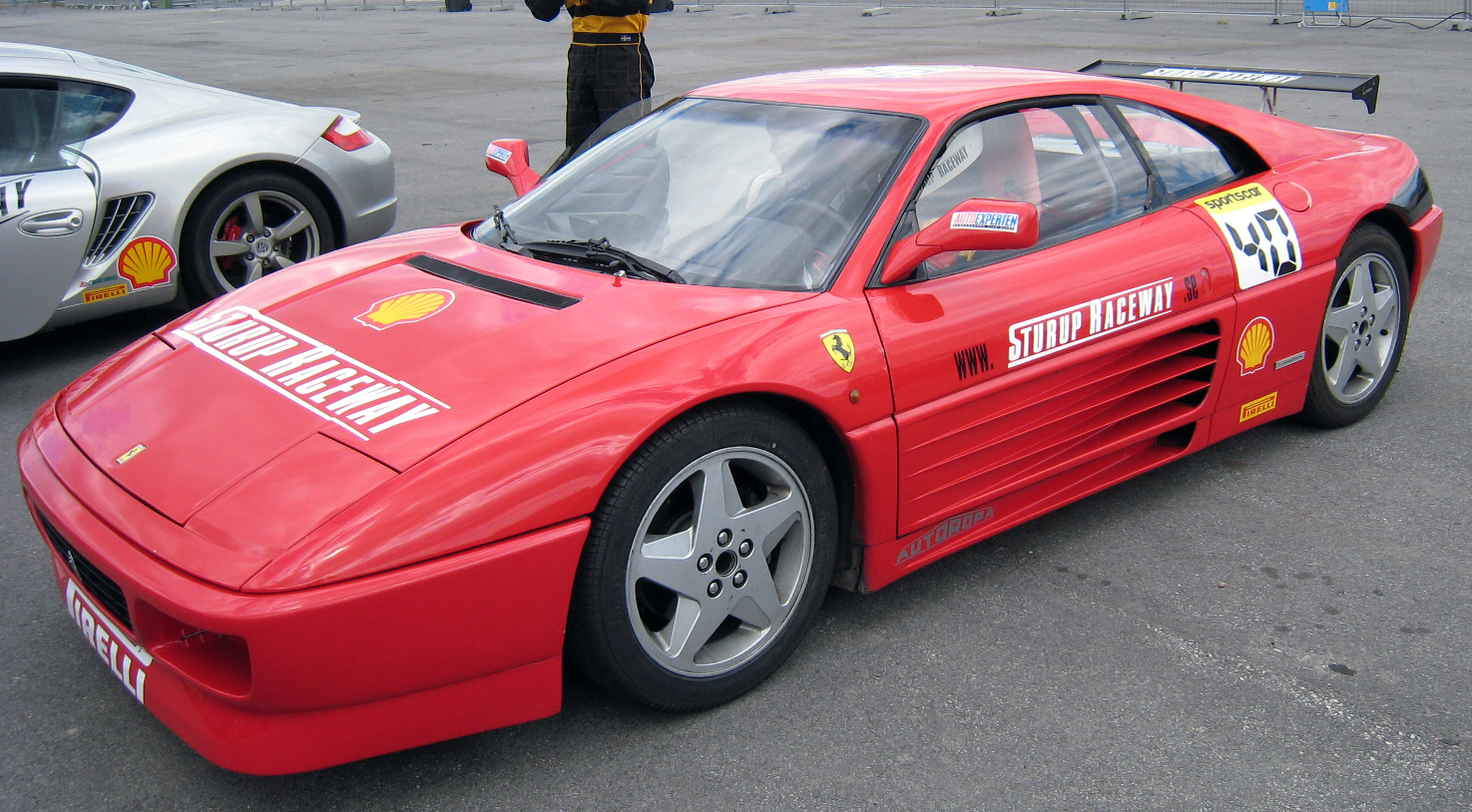
Ferrari 348tb Challenge

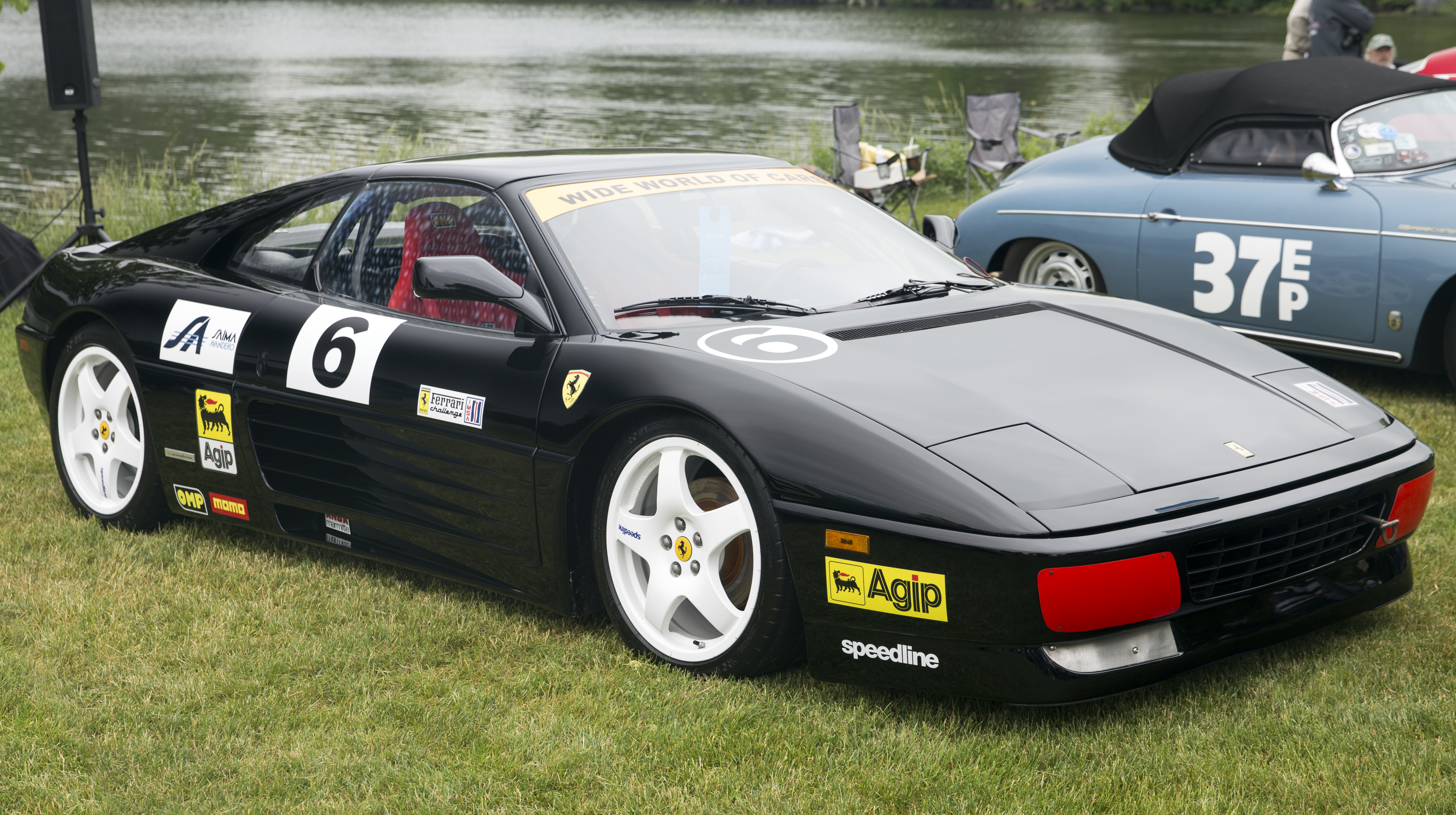
The targa-topped ts was also built to Challenge specifications

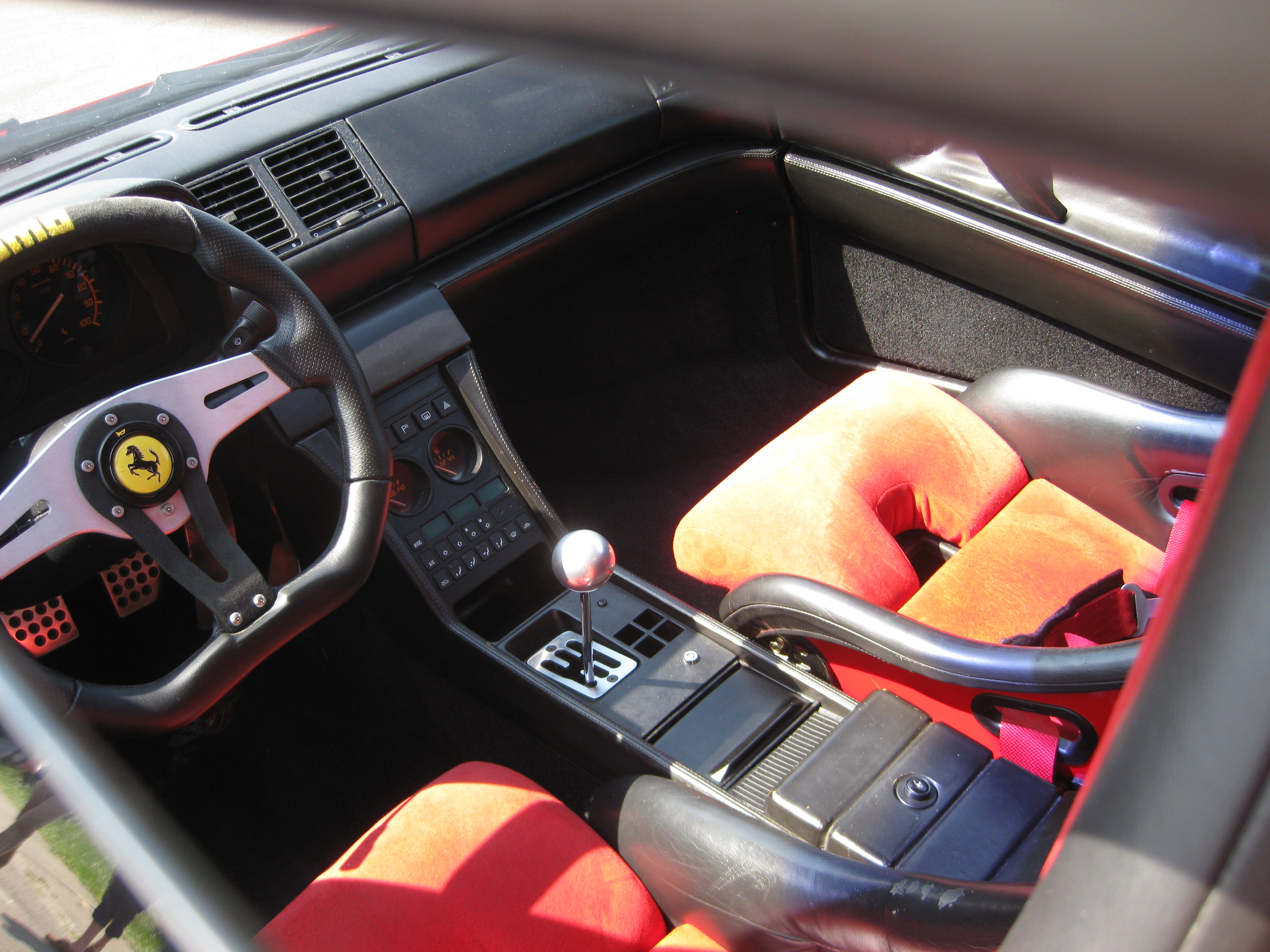
348 Challenge interior

=== 348 GTB, GTS, Spider ===
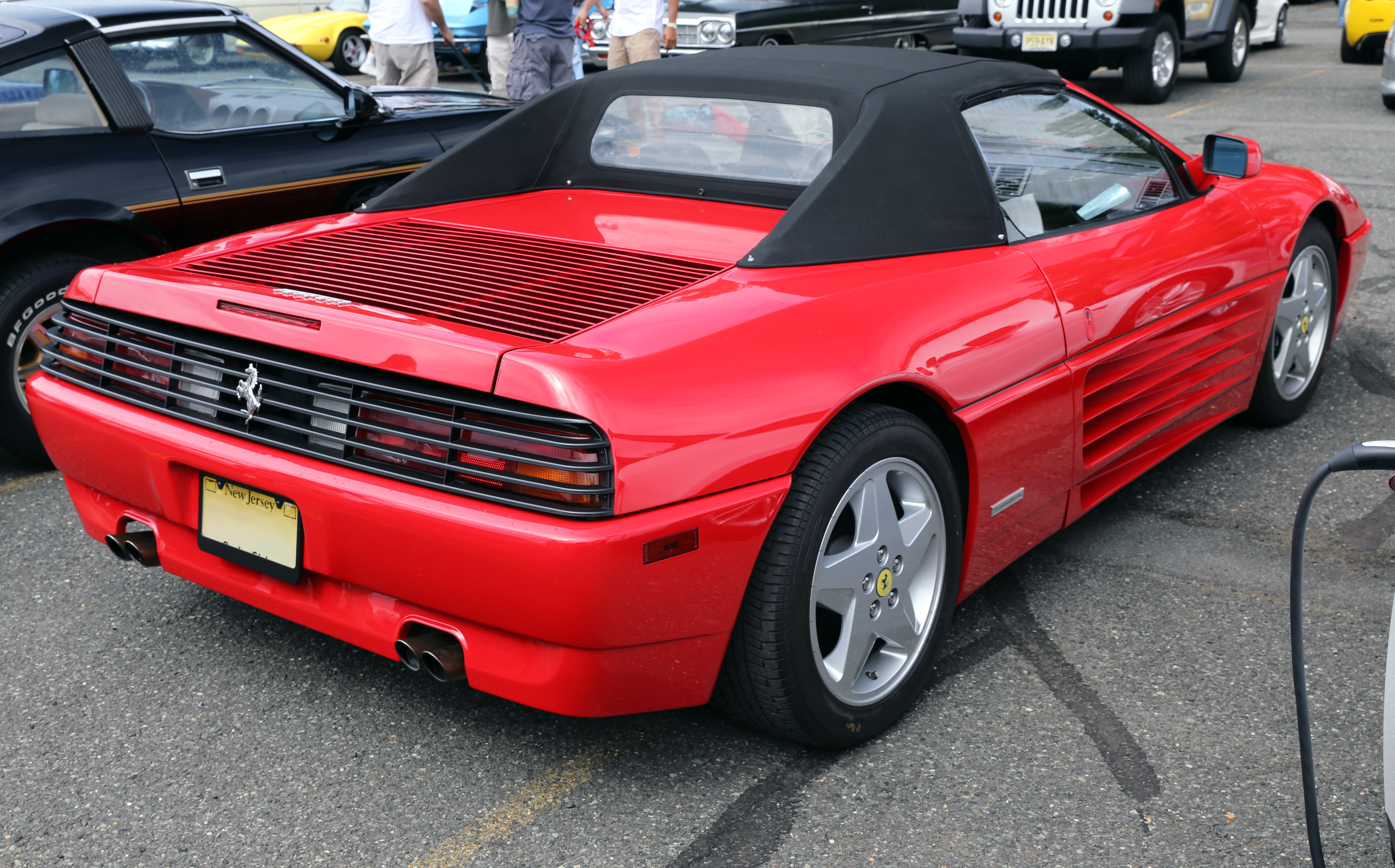
Ferrari 348 Spider

In late 1993, the 348 was revised, featuring subtle styling changes (front grille, rear chrome Cavallino and removable seat cushions) and a bump in power, this time 320 PS (235 kW; 316 hp); 312 hp (233 kW; 316 PS) for North America. The engine remained the same 3.4-litre unit, with an improved version of the Bosch Motronic 2.7 Engine Management System and a new exhaust system with a single muffler.

The revised cars are called 348 GTB and GTS and were presented to the public as the 348 GT versions, equipped with the F119H engine (as opposed to the original F119D and federalized F119G). The F119H engine had an increased 10.8:1 compression ratio as compared to the F119D & F119G's 10.4:1 compression ratio, taller intake plenums, a larger intake compensation valve, fuel pressure raised from 3.4 bar to 3.8 bar, and different camshaft timing.

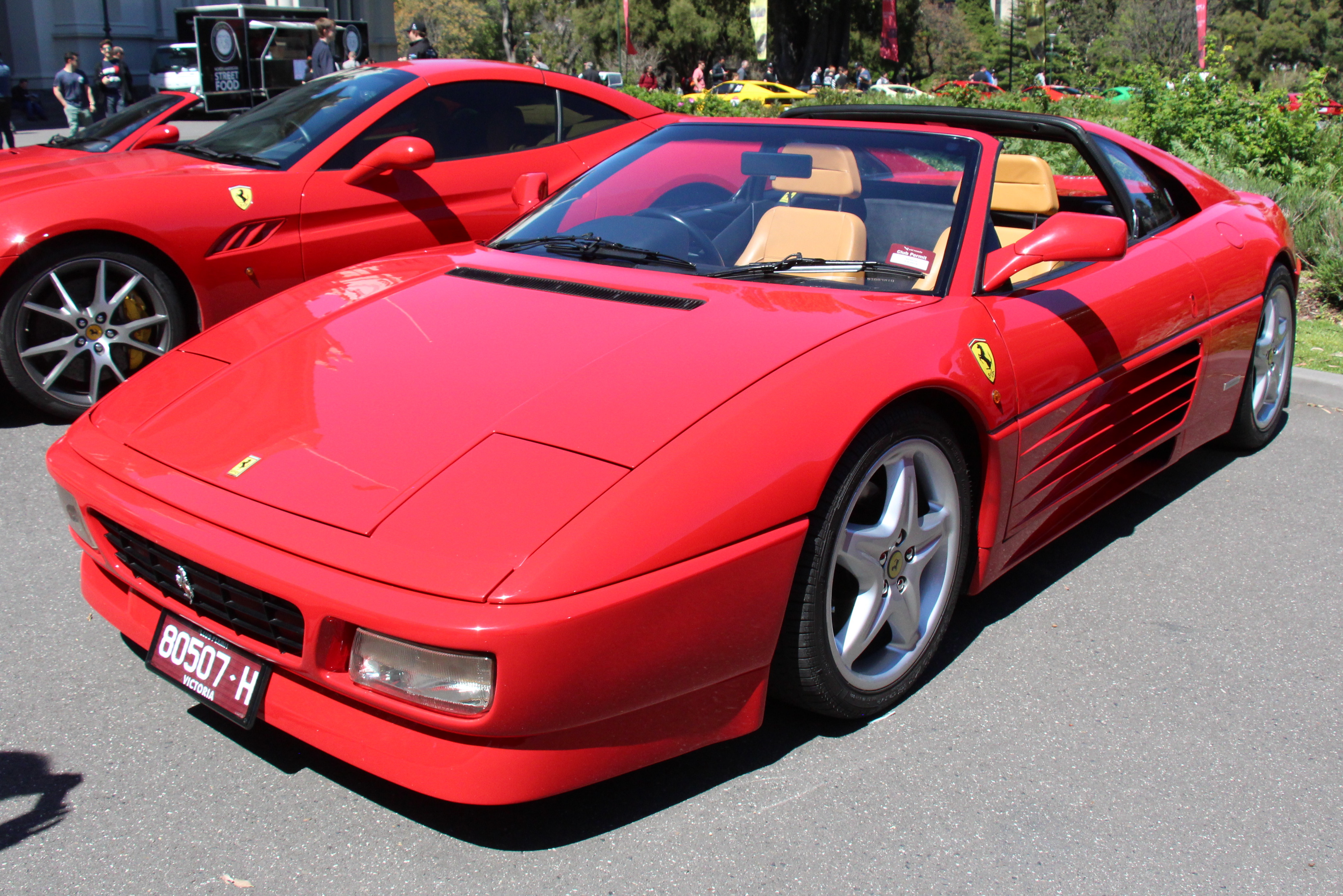
Ferrari 348 GTS

For these models, both the engine cover and lower body skirts were body-coloured instead of black, and the rear track was one inch wider due to the mounting area, on the inside, of the rear wheels being thicker. The suspension geometry was revised which greatly enhanced its handling, ride and body control. The fuel tank was made smaller to reduce overall weight and provide space to improve chassis rigidity; it now held 88 L (23.2 US gal; 19.4 imp gal).

A convertible variant called the Spider was introduced in 1993, ahead of the GTB/GTS which received the same visual revisions. Visual changes for the spider included body coloured lower cladding pieces, a specially designed engine cover and a manual folding soft top. The rear track was increased by 50 mm (2.0 in) compared to the 348 tb. The Spider used the same engine as the 348 GT models and hence benefitted from the increased power output. A new transverse mounted gearbox with modified gear ratios was installed to ensure better acceleration times and shift response.

The GTB and GTS had a very short lifespan, only being built for under a year, with production ending in May 1994. Only 440 examples of the GTB and GTS were built; 222 berlinettas and 218 targas.

=== 348 GT Competizione ===
In 1993, Ferrari presented a lightweight 348 GT Competizione variant as a homologation version for competing in the GT Championship. Safety equipment such as a tool kit was carried over from the 348 Challenge. The braking system was derived from the F40 Evoluzione model. The cars also had modified racing suspension and exhaust system. The engine had a power output of 320 PS (235 kW; 316 hp) at 7,000 rpm and 324 N⋅m (239 lb⋅ft) of torque at 5,000 rpm, consistent to standard late 348 production with the F119H engine. Only 50 were made, including 8 Right Hand Drive models. Special features included a specially trimmed steering wheel indicating the number sequence in the production of the 50 cars, 5-spoke 18-inch Speedline Competizione wheels and cloth trim seats with kevlar structure for weight reduction. Aiding further in the weight reduction was the carbon kevlar composite material used for the front and rear bumpers as well as the doors and a lightweight polycarbonate rear window. Additional interior trim pieces such as door sills featured carbon kevlar and creature comforts such as air conditioning and sound proofing materials were removed. These changes resulted in a dry weight of 1,180 kg (2,601 lb). The final drive in the gear box was changed to 25/27 ratio for improved performance.

== Specifications ==
=== 348 tb and ts ===
- Engine: (F119D, F119G) DOHC, 32 valve V8, 3405 cc / 207.77 cid
- Bore/stroke: 85mm x 75mm
- Compression ratio: 10.4:1
- Dual 54mm throttle bodies
- 30.5mm intake valves, 27.5mm exhaust valves
- Intake cam: .362" lift with 227° of duration at 0.50" of lift
- Exhaust cam: .324" lift with 219° of duration at 0.50" of lift
- Firing order: 1–5–3–7–4–8–2–6
- Power: 300 PS (221 kW; 296 hp) at 7,200 rpm
- Maximum torque: 238 lb/ft, 324 Nm at 4,200 rpm
- Transmission: 5-speed manual
- Chassis: Steel platform & sub-frame
- Suspension: Independent all round
- Brakes: 4-wheel disc ABS
- Maximum speed: 267 km/h (166 mph)
- Acceleration:
  - 0–97 km/h (60 mph): 6.0 seconds
  - 0–161 km/h (100 mph): 15.3 seconds
- 1/4 mile : 14.5 seconds

=== 348 GTB, GTS and Spider ===
- Engine: (F119H) DOHC, 32 valve V8, 3405 cc
- Bore/stroke: 85mm x 75mm
- Compression ratio: 10.8:1
- Power: 320 PS (235 kW; 316 hp) at 7,200 rpm
- Maximum torque: 238 lb⋅ft (323 N⋅m) at 5,000 rpm
- Transmission: 5-speed manual
- Chassis: Steel platform & sub-frame
- Suspension: Independent all round
- Brakes: 4-wheel disc ABS
- Maximum speed: over 280 km/h (over 174 mph)
- Acceleration
  - 0–100 km/h (62 mph): 5.4 seconds
  - 0–161 km/h (100 mph): 12.0 seconds
- 1/4 mile : 13.6 seconds (As rated)

== Custom made specials ==
=== Zagato Elaborazione ===
Between 1991 and 1992, Italian coach builder Zagato announced the Zagato Elaborazione package for the Ferrari 348 TB. The changes were all cosmetic and the engine and other mechanical components remained identical to the donor car. At the front of the car a new bumper removed the original's fake central grille and also replaced the Ferrari prancing horse emblem. The side intake cooling ducts were enlarged with the strakes removed and the engine cover was replaced with a glass engine cover showing off the V8 engine. A new round triple tail-light arrangement and an electronically controlled rear spoiler were added. A double bubble roof replaced the original, the idea being that Zagato could lower the roofline of a car, but retain enough headroom for each occupant. Other modifications included custom OZ Racing alloy wheels, external fuel filler caps and a completely reworked interior including a three-inch rear view screen and suede upholstery. Zagato initially announced a production run of 22 examples, but only 10 cars were made.

=== 348 Barchetta Competizione ===
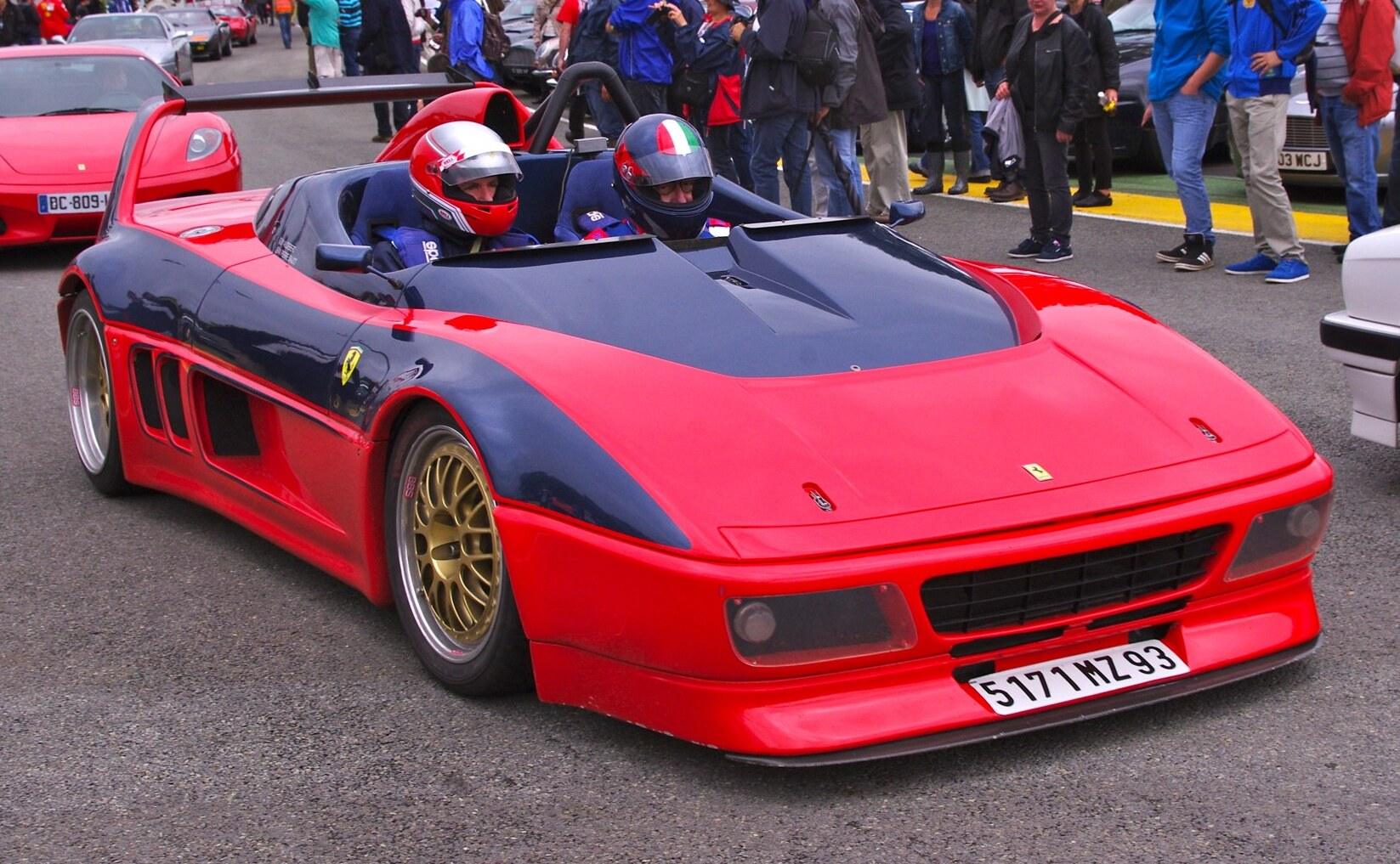
Ferrari 348 Barchetta Competizione

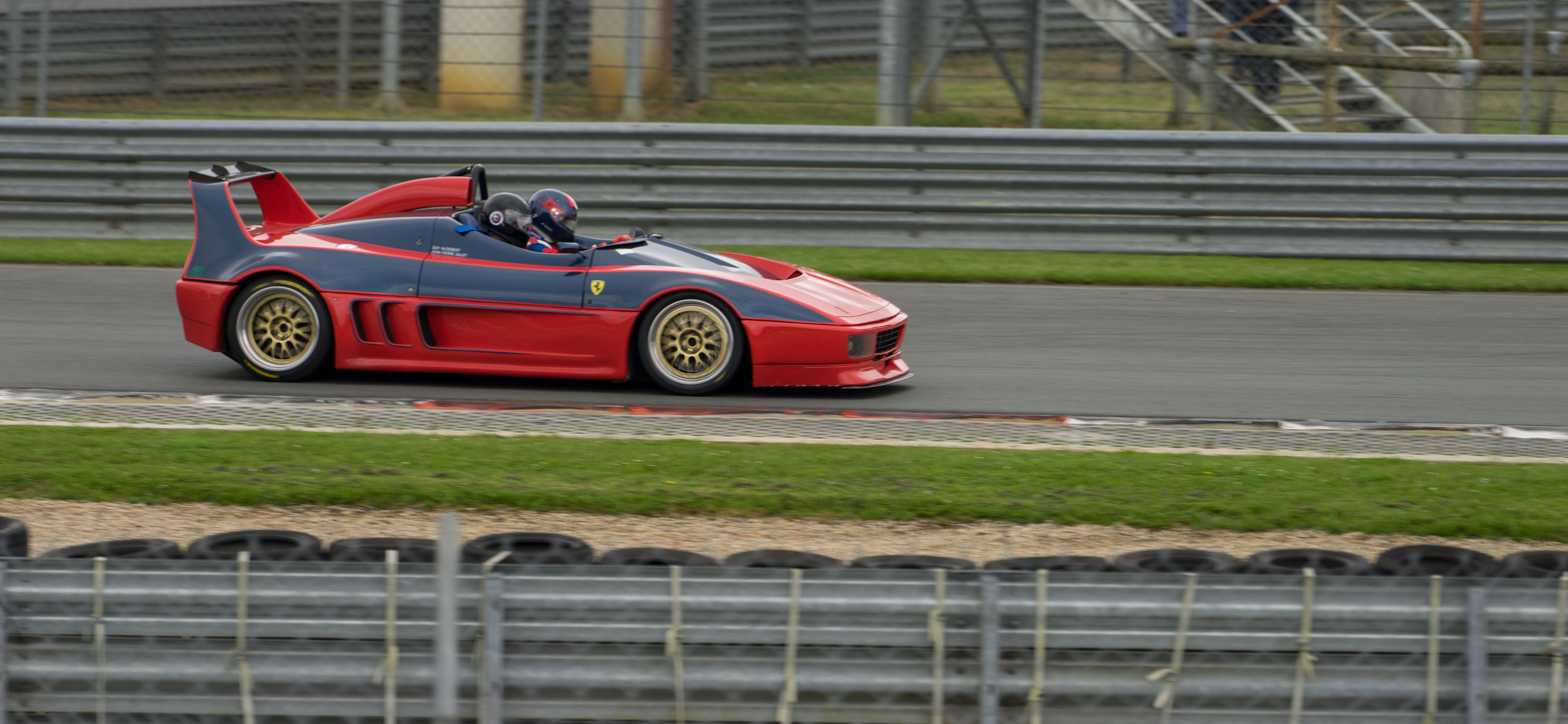
Ferrari 348 Barchetta Competizione on a track

The Ferrari 348 Barchetta Competizione is a one-off special created for car collector Guy Audebert from his crashed Ferrari 348. The car, which has a true open top barchetta body style features heavily modified body work that includes a deeper chin spoiler, removal of the pop-up headlamps with the headlamps integrated in the fog light assembly, quick release bonnet, minimalist racing interior; featuring a detachable steering wheel, Sparco racing bucket seats with six-point harness and a roll bar for the driver's safety, a large air scoop reminiscent to that used in Ferrari F1 cars, racing wing mirrors, replacement of the straked side air intakes with larger air intakes along with two additional vents, tail lights from the Ferrari 328, perforated rear grille, 18-inch BBS racing alloy wheels and a large rear wing inspired by the Ferrari F40 LM. Details of the coach builder that carried out this conversion, the materials used for the body work and the car's technical specifications remain unknown due to the car being mostly kept private but the weight was revealed to be 1,100 kg (2,425 lb).

== Motorsports ==
In 1991, 348 chassis number 82881 was delivered to Ecurie Francorchamps for the purposes of evaluating the 348's suitability for competition use, and its development set the stage for the 348 GT Competizione production models to come near the end of the model run. Outfitted with composite doors, polycarbonate competition windows, and experimental exterior and underbody aerodynamic treatments, the development mule was designated as 348 tb/f, with the f designating the car's creator, Francorchamps, and weighed a total of 1,165 kg (2,569 lbs). The car was frequently run at Spa Ferrari race events, but did not campaign formally within any major series.

For 1993, Michelotto, then known as Ferrari's unofficial race preparation specialist based upon their work in developing the 288 GTO Evoluzione, F40 LM, and 333SP, was commissioned to prepare 11 examples of the 348 CSAI-GT model for competition in such prestigious events as the 24 Hours of Le Mans and Daytona races. Sold with the intention of being campaigned by privateer teams, only 2 of the cars ever saw true competition use, with the remaining 9 disappearing into private collections. Italian race team Jolly Club campaigned one of the 348s alongside their Michelotto-prepared F40 LM, achieving significant success in the Campionato Italiano Supercar GT series, with the 348 winning sequential outright titles in 1993 and 1994, along with 3 category titles.

Michelotto built a further 2 cars in 1994, designated as 348 GTC-LM for competition within the GT2 class, campaigned by Team Repsol and Ferrari Club Italia. Team Repsol placed 4th in the GT2 class for the 1994 24 Hours of Le Mans, following a trio of Porsche 911 GTs, and 11th overall. The 348 GTC-LMs also placed 2nd and 6th at Vallelunga 6hr and 4hr races, and 5th at Spa 4 hours for the season, along with another Michelotto 348 taking 7th in the GT2 class for the Daytona 24 hours.

== Other uses ==
=== Use as a test mule ===
Two Ferrari 348s were used as two of the three test mules for the Ferrari Enzo namely M1 and M3 respectively. Details about the M1 remain unknown but some images surfaced online show that it was painted black and had stretched bodywork while the M3 featured heavily modified bodywork to accommodate the V12 engine and gearbox which were intended to be used in the production car along with many components from its successors, the F355 and the F430 respectively. The engine in the test mule produced 679 PS (499 kW; 670 hp), 20 PS (15 kW; 20 hp) more than that of the production car. The car was not kept by Ferrari and was auctioned off in 2005 to a private collector at a price of €190,000; making its presence known to the public. The car was famous as "the Frankenstein Ferrari" due to it being a by-product of many Ferrari models. Due to this fact and a lack of model name and safety features, it was deemed not road-legal.

== Reception ==
The Ferrari 348 made its debut in September 1989 at the Frankfurt Auto Show to positive reviews, cited as "Best in Show" by Road & Track and AutoWeek coverage. In a later 1991 comparison against the NSX, Road & Track inquired, "Has Honda bettered Ferrari?" The magazine concluded the Ferrari 348 was "the better exotic" and would later name it "one of the ten best cars in the world". Auto journalists described the 348 as, "something quite special", and the engine being the formative element in defining the car's character, rising in an "operatic crescendo", having the "power to raise goose bumps as Pavarotti climbing to that note in Nessun Dorma." Gavin Green reviewed the 348 against contemporaries in Car Magazine in October 1990: "There is nothing like it. It communicates so richly, involves you so completely. And, when you have finished driving it – cocooned in that exquisite cockpit – you can get out and feast your eyes on one of the loveliest cars ever designed."

Los Angeles Times staff writer Paul Dean described the car in July 1990, "Ferrari builds motor cars in much the same way Claude Monet painted landscapes—not to please the populace, but more to satisfy self, a technique and a coterie", with the 348 as a "better looking, stronger, faster" successor to the "enormously successful" 308/328 series, and "thoroughly irresistible". Revising the longitudinal V8 layout in the way of the 288 GTO and F40, with a dry sump and transversely mounted "new gearbox and transmission (actually a carry-over from a Ferrari Formula 1 racing car)", the center of gravity is lower "by about 2 inches. Ergo flatter handling, and better steering response."

Autocar Magazine featured a comparison of the 348tb, Honda NSX, Porsche 911 Turbo, and Lotus Esprit in the July 1993 article, "Lord of the Fliers", by Stephen Sutcliffe. Through the road test that extended from Paris to Le Mans, the 348 was lauded for its styling and presence, "Crawling out of Paris in the thick of the densest French traffic jam any of us can ever recall, three things about our convoy were already becoming apparent. The First – how much more attention and affection the French public had in reserve for the Ferrari – was perhaps predictable, especially since the 348 had already blown the others into the water at Dover when it came to impressing the locals. Even so, the crowds that gathered like bees to honey wherever and whenever we parked it, and the comparative lack of enthusiasm for the other three, still came as something of a shock."

On the Le Mans race circuit, the 348s control and steering garnered praise over the NSX, "It's the Honda's body control and its meaty yet beautifully positive steering that allows it to feel so natural through the Esses of Le Mans; both seem peerless. Until you try the Ferrari. In the 348 you've got the same degree of body control, the same iron tautness through the corners, but the steering – lighter than the Honda's but with much more feedback – lifts it clear of even the mighty NSX at La Sarthe." Critique found the 348 difficult in traffic due to heavy steering and controls, though transformative on open road, "the further we traveled and the harder we drove in France, the more special, the more unique the Ferrari felt. We argued long and hard over which of the two made the best noise under full throttle, although no one disputed the fact that the NSX was more refined overall and had vastly superior gearchange. But ultimately this is as much the Honda's problem as it is its strength. Because it is so well honed as an all-rounder, so easy to live with, it misses out on that last 10 per cent of pure, raw thoroughbred sports car appeal that makes the Ferrari such a deliciously rich experience. Partly it is the steering; the NSX's is very good, the 348's exquisite. And partly it is the extra sharpness of the Ferrari's chassis, which is that crucial fraction more responsive to your inputs than not only the NSX but also any other supercar this side of £100,000 we can think of."

Peter Dron of Motor Trend gave the car a negative review, criticising its acceleration by saying, "For some manufacturers, it might be hard to go to market when competitors are offering cars with demonstrably better performance for tens of thousands of dollars less. Ferrari, however, seems blessed with such cache that the numbers gleaned from mere fifth wheels don't seem to make much of a difference. Take the Ferrari 348, for example. Its 0-60-mph time of about 6 seconds can be bested by such lesser-priced machinery as an L98 Corvette. Its slalom speed of a little over 63 mph is flat blown away by the humbly priced Nissan 300ZX Turbo." The engine note was also criticised, with the publication noting, "It doesn't sound like a V-8; in fact, the noise it makes is more like a high-pitched turbine than anything else, the characteristic whine of the flat-plane crank. It doesn't have the hard edge of Lamborghini's V-8 (similar to the old Cosworth DFV) or the deep, throaty rumble of the high-performance domestic engines. It isn't an unpleasant noise, but it won't make the hairs on the back of your neck stand on edge. It's simply an efficient device, to be used to the fullest." The exterior design, especially the fake front grille received a negative reception as well, with the publication remarking, "Least flattering is the full frontal view, and that dummy grille is a copout: If you don't need a grille, why have one? An innovative aerodynamic approach would have made more sense. In the press handout (referring to the Testarossa-style side strakes) is the following remark: 'On a Ferrari a technical requirement becomes a stylistic theme and nothing is simply there for decoration.' Oh, really?"

In a 2015 retrospective, Evo Magazine compared the 458 Italia against its 308, 348, F355, 360 and F430 ancestors, where Henry Catchpole noted the primary highlight of the day being the 348's steering, describing it as, "instantly obvious this car has some of the best steering, possibly the best, that I have ever sat behind." He expounded on the car's analogue character, describing the steering as, "coming alive in my hands. It literally starts wriggling around, talking excitedly about all the bumps in the road and sometimes making a bigger gesture as a camber attracts its attention. Despite the lack of assistance and the wheel’s relatively small diameter, it’s not heavy in any way, there’s just perfect weight and no slack to add to the constant communication."

Some areas of critique focused around the long-established topic of Ferrari gearboxes, typically stiff and balky when cold. The 348 did not break from tradition in this area, requiring careful adjustment and lubricating considerations, as well as full warm up, and was found to perform best with quick and aggressive driving. Mike McCarthy of May 1994's Wheels Magazine said, "It's only when you allow the engine full voice that the 348's drivetrain really works ... Only then does this drivetrain achieve harmony", with the gear lever "moving fast and fluidly", leaving "no surprise to anyone who knows why Ferrari has the reputation it does", summarizing it to be, "very much like what you imagine a Ferrari might be." Paul Dean described, "Gears are given up smoothly only when the moment, the engine, the clutch and shift are in concert. But finding that moment, being the conductor of a coordinated downshift, earning some respect from a benchmark machine that rises above the best of our abilities ... ah, there's the defiance but also the satisfaction of Ferrari." Though lauded for its capability on a race circuit, oversteer characteristics at the limit in early 348s became a point of concern for the buying public due to the sensitive nature of the chassis setup, leading to updated mounting points in the rear combined with revised alignment specifications in later cars.

The 348 was particularly despised by former Ferrari president Luca Cordero di Montezemolo. According to him, back in 1991 he purchased a yellow 348, and while driving around Rome he stopped at a traffic light and, when the light turned green, for a few dozens meters the 348 was out-accelerated by a Volkswagen Golf Mk2 GTI driven by a young man, who recognized Montezemolo and jokingly remarked that his car run much better than the Ferrari. Afterwards Montezemolo held a meeting at Ferrari where he scolded his engineers, declaring that the 348 was "a shitty car, that makes noise and doesn't move". He then called former Formula One driver Niki Lauda for a test drive, who later confirmed Montezemolo's harsh opinion.
