= Mauro Forghieri =

Italian mechanical engineer (1935–2022)

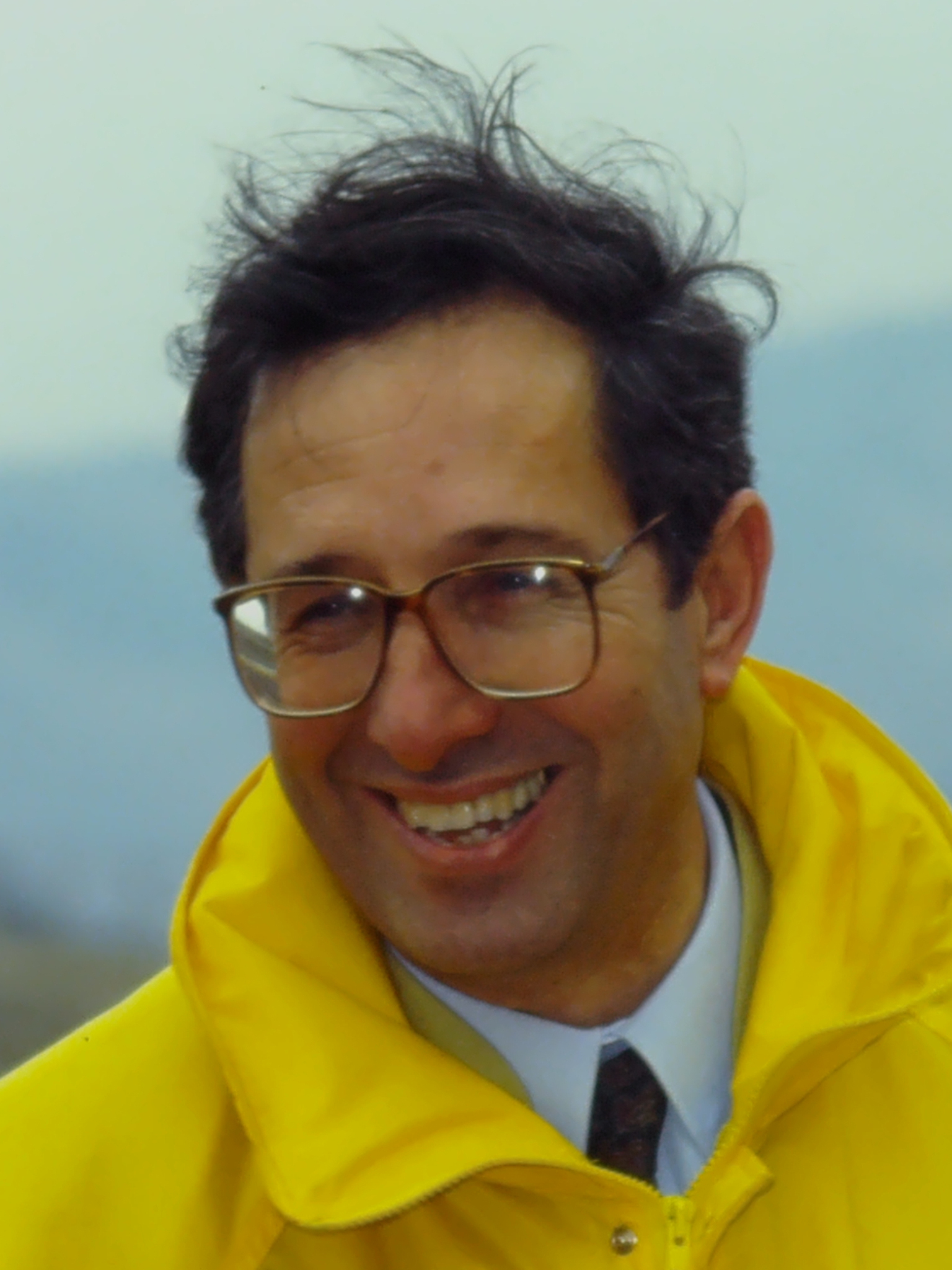
- Forghieri in 1991
- Born: 13 January 1935; Modena, Italy
- Died: 2 November 2022 (aged 87); Modena, Italy
- Occupation: Formula One car designer

Mauro Forghieri (13 January 1935 – 2 November 2022) was an Italian mechanical engineer, best known for his work as a Formula One racing car designer with Scuderia Ferrari during the 1960s and 1970s. He is credited with introducing the first designed rear wings to Formula One at the 1968 Belgian Grand Prix. He oversaw numerous technical developments during his tenure at Ferrari, including the creation of the 250 GTO and P-series sports racing cars, the Ferrari flat-12 series of engines, Ferrari's first turbocharged engine in the 126 C F1 car, and a prototype semi-automatic transmission in 1979. During Forghieri's tenure with Ferrari, the company won the F1 World Driver's Championship four times and the F1 World Constructors' Championship seven times. After leaving Ferrari in 1987, he worked at Lamborghini and Bugatti then founded the Oral Engineering Group in 1995.

== Early life ==
Forghieri was born in Modena, Emilia-Romagna, on 13 January 1935, the only child of Reclus and Afra Forghieri. His father Reclus, a turner, did war work during World War II for the Ansaldo mechanical workshops of Naples. During this time, Mauro lived primarily with his mother, spending time in Naples, Milan, Modena and Abbiategrasso. After the war, the Forghieri family reunited and returned to Modena, where Reclus began working in the Ferrari workshop in Maranello. Meanwhile, Mauro completed the liceo scientifico and in 1959 obtained a laurea in Mechanical Engineering from the University of Bologna.

== Career ==
=== Ferrari ===
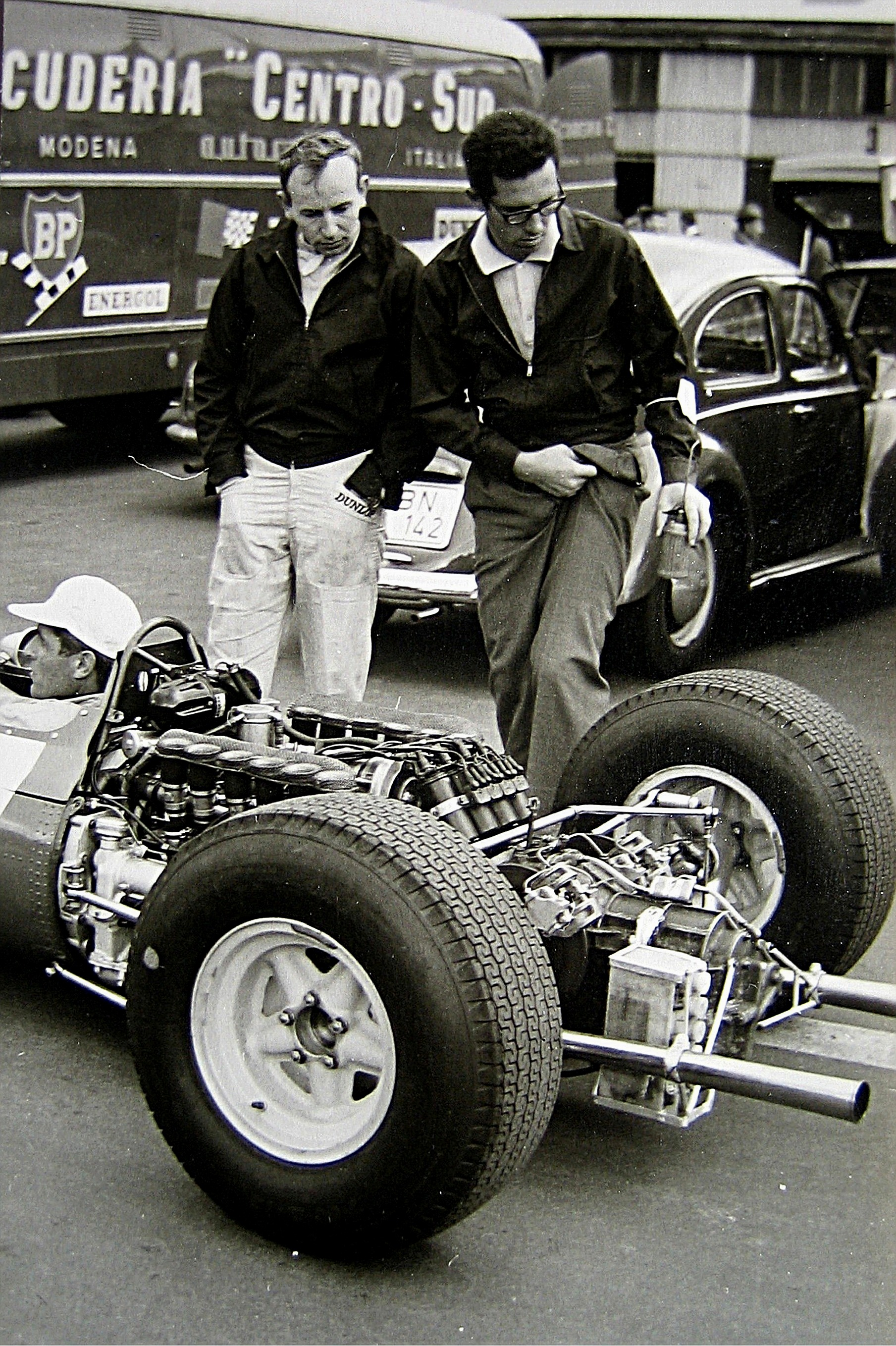
Forghieri (right) with John Surtees inspecting a Ferrari 1512 in 1965 at the Nürburgring

Despite his initial interest in aviation design, Forghieri accepted an internship offer from Ferrari, to which he had been introduced by his father. Beginning in spring of 1960, he started an apprenticeship in the engine department. Forghieri began working alongside many engineers involved in Ferrari's early history, including Vittorio Jano, Carlo Chiti and Luigi Bazzi, as well as race director Romolo Tavoni. He also worked alongside Giampaolo Dallara, who joined Ferrari shortly after Forghieri in 1960. Forghieri's early work at the factory involved both racing cars and production road cars.

In 1961, some key figures at Ferrari, including chief designer Carlo Chiti, left to join the breakaway ATS Formula One team, in an event that became known as "the great walkout". Forghieri remained as the only credentialed engineer on staff. Soon after the walkout, Forghieri was personally asked by Enzo Ferrari to begin studying the "full technical questions of the Factory" (Forghieri's words). As he was only 27 years of age at the time, Forghieri received guidance from a few more experienced staff members, including Franco Rocchi, Walter Salvarani and Angelo Bellei. Forghieri was soon appointed technical director for racing cars, a position he would remain in until 1984. His responsibilities included overseeing technical development, managing the technical section during races and collaborating with other Ferrari departments, including the testing department and the drafting department.

Forghieri left his position as technical director in 1984. In January 1985, he began work on the Ferrari 408 4RM concept car. The 408 project was completed in Spring of 1987 and Forghieri departed Ferrari for good shortly after.

==== Notable designs at Ferrari ====
Forghieri was involved to some degree in the development of every racing car produced by the Factory between his hiring after graduation and his departure in 1987.

The sports racing cars designed under Forghieri's supervision included the GT-class 250 GTO, the development of which Forghieri continued after the original team headed by Chiti and Giotto Bizzarrini left during the 1961 walkout. Other GT-class cars included competition versions of the 275 GTB and the 330 LMB. Sports prototypes designed by Forghieri's team included the P series and later iterations of the Dino series, starting with the 1965 Dino 166 P. Forghieri stated that the 1967 330 P4 was his favorite out of all the cars he designed.

In 1964, Forghieri designed the V8-powered Ferrari 158, in which John Surtees won the 1964 Formula One World Championship. The 158 and the Ferrari 1512 shared a Forghieri-designed aluminum monocoque chassis, the first use of this technology in a Ferrari F1 car.

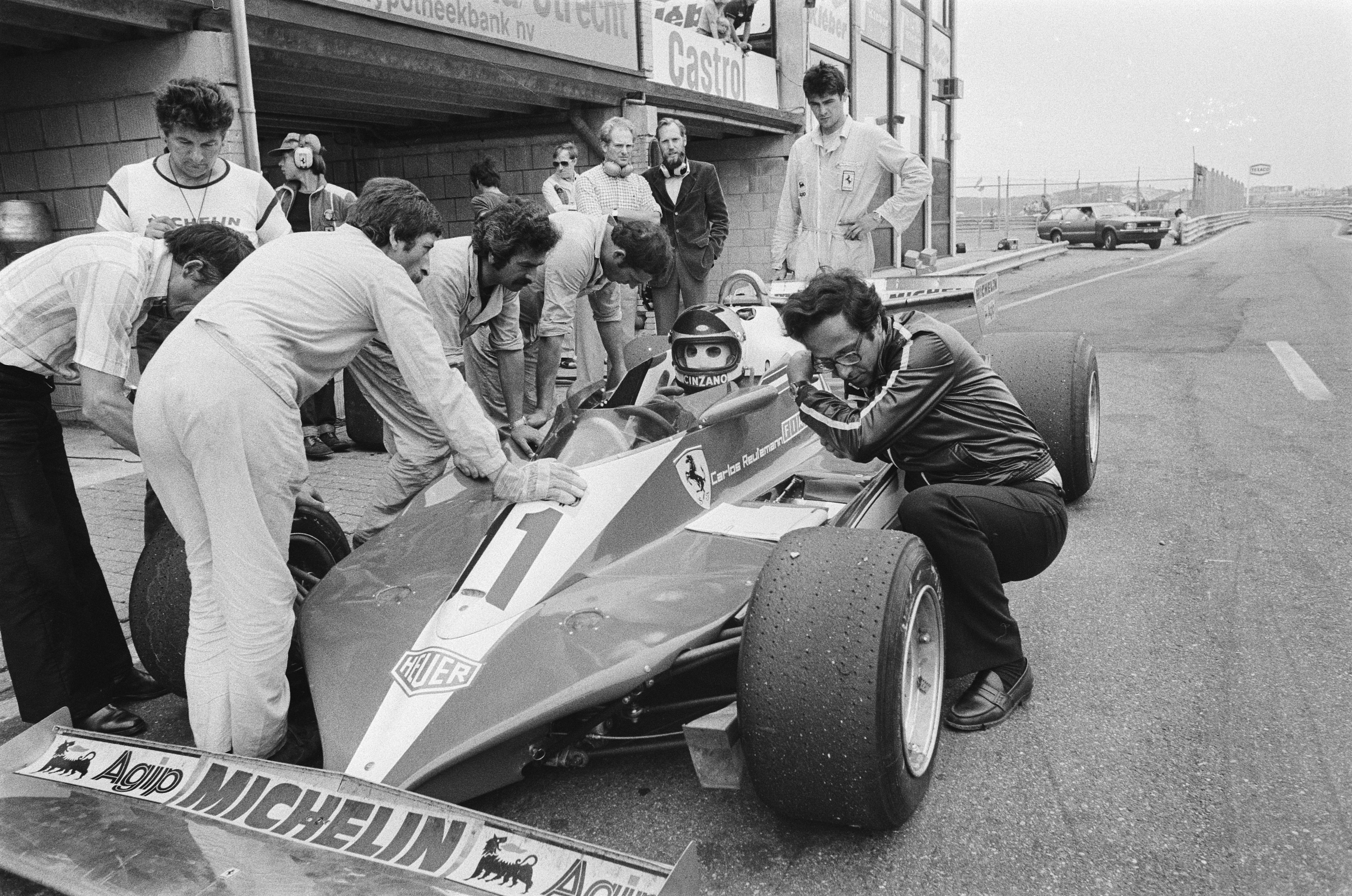
Forghieri (kneeling, right) with driver Carlos Reutemann testing the Ferrari 312 T3 at Zandvoort in 1978

Beginning in 1966, Forghieri designed the Ferrari 312 series (consisting of the 312, 312B and 312T Formula One cars and 312P and 312PB sportscars). In 1979, he designed a semi-automatic transmission for the 312T, which was tested by Gilles Villeneuve but never used in competition. This predated the use of a similar system in the 1989 Ferrari 640 F1 car and the introduction of the roadgoing "F1" automated manual transmission in the 1997 F355. In 1979 he began work on Ferrari's first turbocharged engine, which debuted in the 1981 126 C. Under his guidance, Ferrari won the driver's F1 world championship title four times, with John Surtees (1964), Niki Lauda (1975 and 1977), and Jody Scheckter (1979). Ferrari also won the constructors F1 world championship title seven times.

=== Lamborghini and Bugatti ===
In September 1987, Forghieri joined Lamborghini Engineering, a department created by Lee Iacocca, then CEO of Chrysler, who had bought the Emilian car firm Lamborghini.

In that organization, which had ex-Ferrari Daniele Audetto as sports director, Forghieri designed the naturally aspirated Lamborghini 3512 V12 engine, which made its Formula One racing debut at the 1989 Brazilian Grand Prix. The V12 engine was used by the Larrousse/Lola team during the 1989 F1 season. This engine was also used in the 1990 Lotus 102 F1 car.

Following the encouraging performance of the engine, the project of designing a complete F1 car was conceived, thanks to financing by the Mexican businessman Fernando Gonzalez Luna. The newly-formed team was named GLAS F1, from an abbreviation of Gonzales Luna Associates. Former journalist Leopoldo Canettoli was picked to run the team. The car's suspension and gearbox were designed by Forghieri and the bodywork was designed by Mario Tolentino. The first complete car, the GLAS 001, was slated for a debut at the 1990 Mexican GP, but the day before the official presentation to the press, Gonzalez Luna disappeared with a conspicuous amount of money that had been paid by sponsors. Following Luna's disappearance, the car and team remained in financial limbo until the team was purchased by Carlo Patrucco in July 1990. Patrucco created Modena Team (also known as the Lamborghini or "Lambo" team) and the Forghieri/Tolentino-designed car debuted as the Lambo 291 at the 1991 United States Grand Prix.

In 1991, the Lamborghini Engineering department was completely reorganized by Chrysler enterprise and Forghieri was replaced by Mike Royce. In 1992, he became the technical director of the re-emerging Bugatti, where he stayed until 1994. While at Bugatti, Forghieri was involved in the development of the EB 110 and the EB 112.

In 1994, he was called as an expert in the trial relating to the death of driver Ayrton Senna at the 1994 San Marino Grand Prix.

=== Oral Engineering Group ===
On 1 January 1995, Forghieri co-founded with Franco Antoniazzi and Sergio Lugli the Oral Engineering Group, a mechanical design company. Forghieri was active in company operations, which include design, research and development of automobile, motorcycle, marine and go-kart engines and components. Clients include BMW, Bugatti, and Aprilia. Oral Engineering was commissioned to convert the Ferrari Pinin concept car from a static display into a driveable vehicle.

=== Project 1221 ===
Around 2005, Forghieri joined Project 1221, an Italian automobile company developing a new MF1 sports car, as chief engineer.

== Later life ==
Forghieri was critical of the drag reduction system introduced to Formula One in the 2010s. He was declared an honorary citizen of Modena in 2021.

Forghieri died on 2 November 2022, at the age of 87. Scuderia Ferrari commemorated Forghieri's passing with decals reading "ciao Furia", meaning "goodbye Fury," Forghieri's nickname during his time at Ferrari. These decals were applied to Scuderia Ferrari F1-75 cars at the 2022 São Paulo Grand Prix and 488 GTE cars at the 2022 8 Hours of Bahrain FIA World Endurance Championship race.

== Formula One Championships ==
Forghieri-designed cars won eight World Constructors' and four World Drivers' championships.

No.	Season	Constructors' Champion	Drivers' Champion	Car	Engine
1	1964	Ferrari	John Surtees	158/1512	Ferrari 1.5L V8/Flat-12
2	1975	Ferrari	Niki Lauda	312T	Ferrari 3.0L Flat-12
3	1976	Ferrari	—N/a	312T2	Ferrari 3.0L Flat-12
4	1977	Ferrari	Niki Lauda	312T2	Ferrari 3.0L Flat-12
5	1979	Ferrari	Jody Scheckter	312T4	Ferrari 3.0L Flat-12
6	1982	Ferrari	—N/a	126C2	Ferrari 1.5L V6 turbo
7	1983	Ferrari	—N/a	126C3	Ferrari 1.5L V6 turbo
