= Nicola Materazzi =

Italian mechanical engineer (1939–2022)

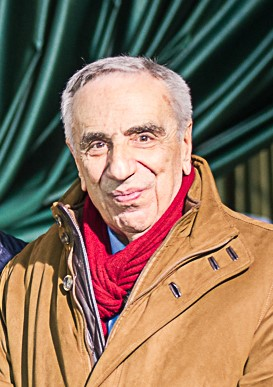
- Materazzi in 2018
- Born: 28 January 1939; Caselle in Pittari, Italy
- Died: 24 August 2022 (aged 83); Sapri, Italy
- Education: University of Naples Federico II
- Occupations: Technical director, mechanical engineer
- Employers: B Engineering; Laverda; Bugatti; Cagiva; Ferrari; Osella; Lancia
- Known for: Lancia Stratos Gr.4 Gr.5; Osella FA2 FA1; Ferrari 288 GTO; Ferrari F40; Ferrari 126C; Lancia LC2 (Engine design); Bugatti EB110 GT & SS; Cagiva C589 (Engine design); Laverda 750; B Engineering Edonis

Nicola Materazzi (28 January 1939 – 24 August 2022) was an Italian mechanical engineer who developed several sports and racing cars, including the Ferrari 288 GTO, Ferrari F40, Bugatti EB110, and B Engineering Edonis. He was one of Italy's leading turbocharging specialists from the mid-1970s, a respected sports car and motorcycle engineer, and is sometimes referred to as "Mr. F40" or the "father of the F40".

== Early life ==
Born into a family of doctors, Nicola Materazzi showed an early interest in cars at the age of 4, asking his parents to read him pages of the press articles of the time. During his adolescence, he enrolled in the Liceo Classico school in the town where his father was a practising doctor.

In 1961, he built his first go-kart at the age of 22, and he attended as a spectator his first Targa Florio race in 1966, where he was influenced by agile cars such as the Porsche 904 and Ferrari Dino. In 1970, while a spectator at Monza, he witnessed the accident in practice where Jochen Rindt lost his life.

== Career ==
Along with Gordon Murray, Colin Chapman, Eric Broadley, and Carroll Shelby, Materazzi was one of the most prolific engineering designers of the 1970s, 80s, and 90s, having worked on a total of 38 projects in motorsports, supercars, and motorcycles during a career spanning 42 years. Coming from the region of Cilento, where no automotive industry was present, his first career role started as a Calculations Specialist at the Lancia Turin headquarters. During his career in the Italian automobile industry, he worked with or was the successor to a number of notable engineers, such as Francesco De Virgilio (Lancia), Mario Mezzanotte (Pirelli), Franco Rocchi, Angelo Bellei (Ferrari), Antonio Tomaini (Ferrari, Osella), Massimo Tamburini (Cagiva), Paolo Stanzani (Bugatti), Marcello Gandini, Sergio Scaglietti, and Leonardo Fioravanti.

== List of projects & designs ==
- Lancia Flavia (1968–69) - Materazzi carried out calculations (by hand or mainframe computer) for chassis, steering, suspension
- Lancia Fulvia 1300 & 1600 HF (1969–70) - same as above
- Lancia Stratos Group 4 (1970–74) - became more involved in engine and suspension (MacPherson) applications for racing; then provided race support
- Lancia Stratos Group 5 "Silhouette" (1975–77) - developed the turbocharged engine and the car's bodywork aerodynamics
- Formula Abarth (1978) - developed the whole car for the project initiated by Aurelio Lampredi
- Osella FA2 (1979) - designed the car to compete in Formula 2
- Osella FA1 (1979) - designed the car to compete in Formula 1
- Ferrari 021 engine (1980) - engineered an improved Comprex system (not used) and the KKK turbocharger system
- Ferrari 126C (1980–83) - worked as responsible person for the design office, overseeing engine development for 1980, 81, 82, 83
- Lancia LC2 (1982) - developed "268" engine (2.6L V8), the chassis was designed by Giampaolo Dallara
- Ferrari F114B engine (1983–84) - developed 2.857L V8 engine for the 288 GTO and defined much of the vehicle architecture (change from transverse to longitudinal engine)
- Ferrari Testarossa engine (1984) - collaborated on the engine design
- Ferrari 412 engine (1985) - collaborated on the engine design
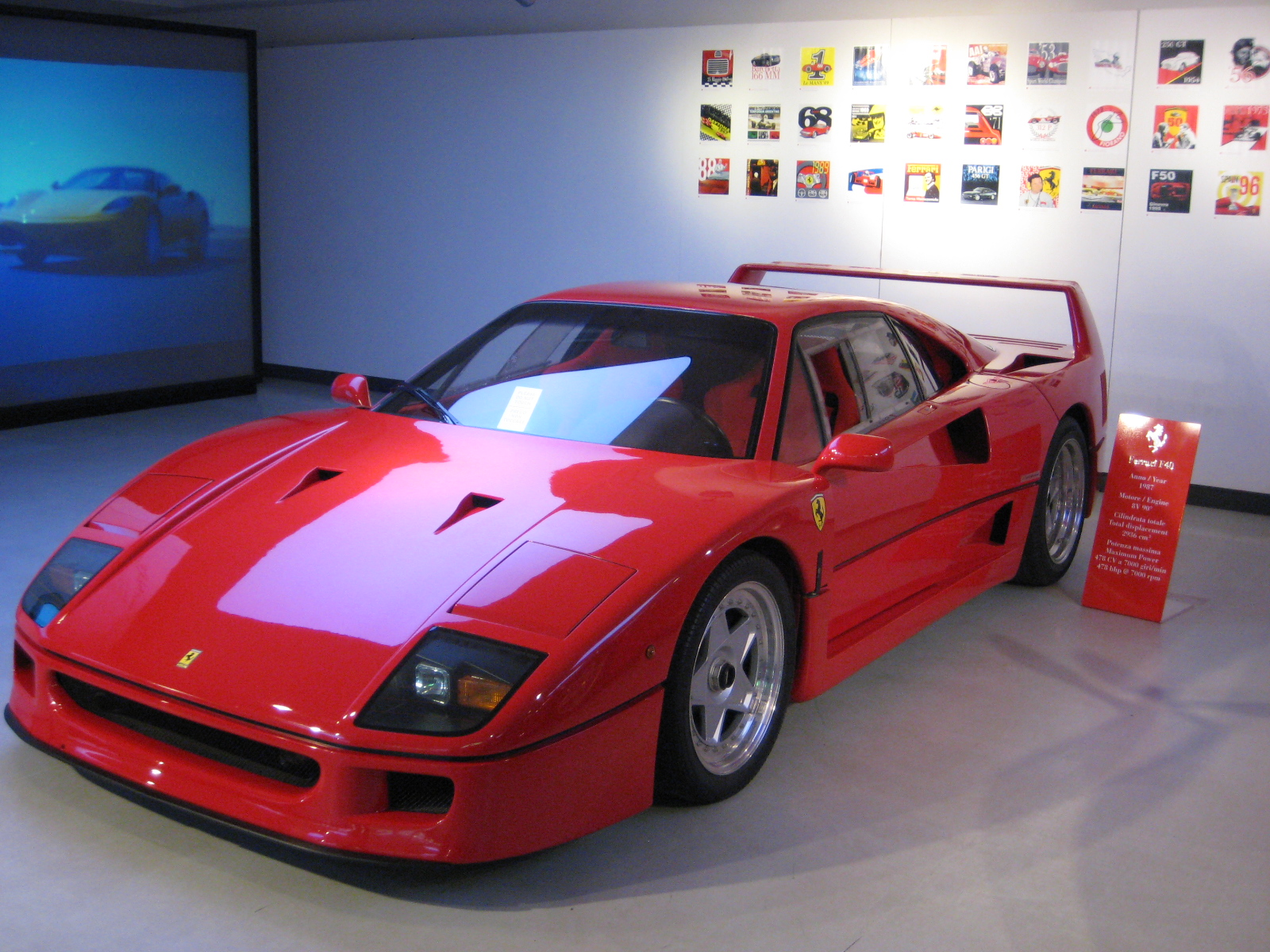
  Ferrari F40
- Ferrari GTO Evoluzione (1984–86) - Chief Engineer for the vehicle
- Ferrari 328 Turbo (1985–86) - Chief Engineer for the engine
- Ferrari F120A/B engine (1986) - Chief Engineer for the engine
- Ferrari F40 (1986) - Chief Engineer for the vehicle
- Ferrari F121A engine (1987) - Chief Engineer. This 200 hp/litre engine was not used
- Cagiva 589 (1988) - Technical Director
- Cagiva 591 (1990) - Technical Director
- Bugatti EB110 GT (1991) - Technical Director; introduced carbon-fibre chassis, engine improvements (engine was designed by Tecnostile), altered F/R torque distribution
- Bugatti EB110 SS (1992) - Technical Director; implemented technical specification for lightweight model for 340 km/h
- Laverda 750 (1996–97) - Technical Director; developed new engine
- B Engineering Edonis (2000–05) - Technical Director; chief engineer for complete vehicle (car styled by Marc Deschamps)

== Lancia, Abarth, Osella (1968–1979) ==
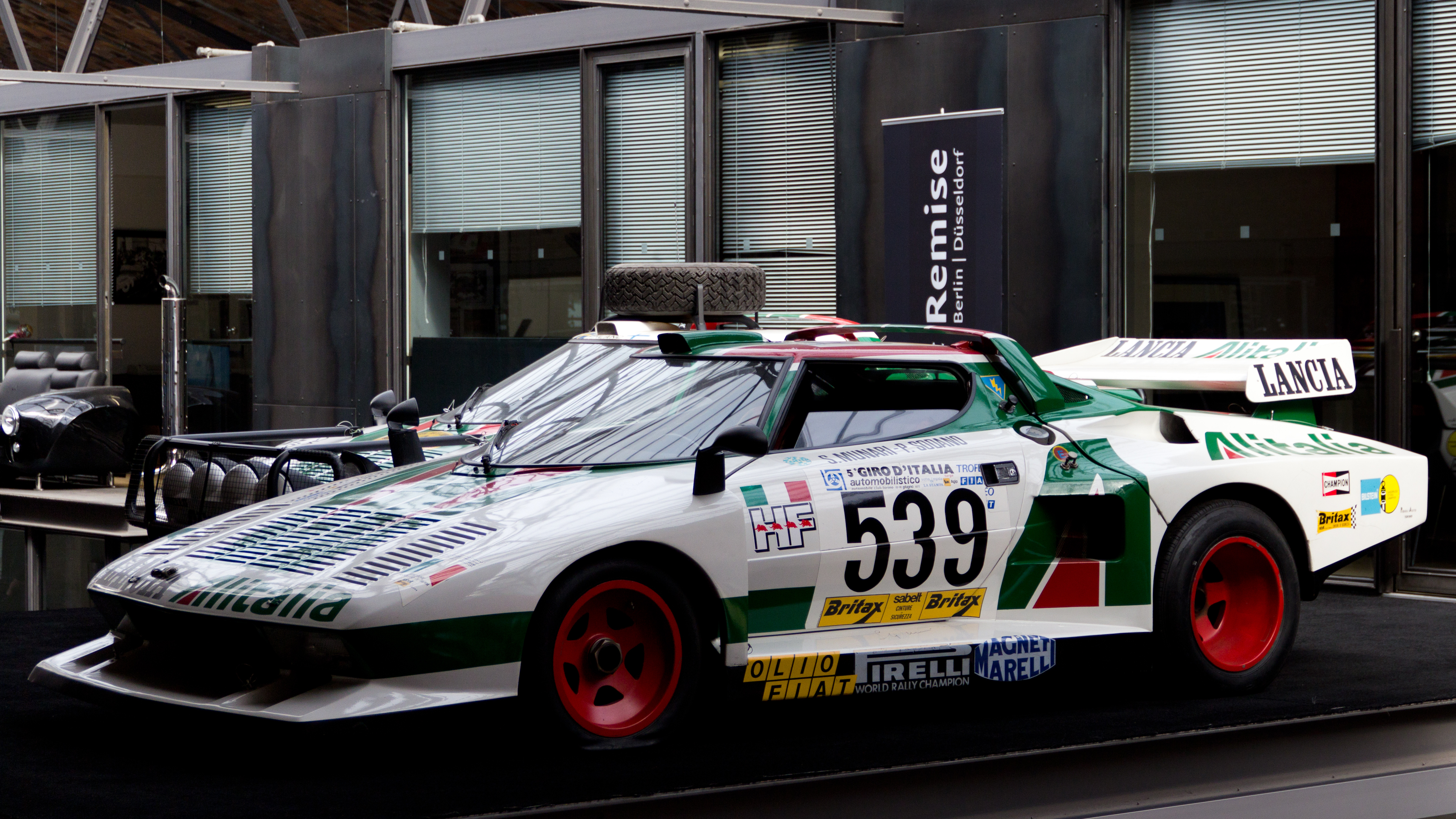
Lancia Stratos Turbo Group 5

After high school, he spent the summers of 1964 and 1965 in internships at the Mobil Oil refinery near Naples, where he learned about fuels and the important octane properties of different formulations of gasoline. After graduation in engineering at the University of Naples, he spent about a year working there as an assistant professor, leaving during the tense atmosphere created by the student protests of 1968.

Hired by the Lancia technical team in the early seventies, he moved to Turin, where he worked as a calculations specialist on chassis, suspension, and steering structures. One of his first important experiences was participating in the development of the Lancia Stratos for rallying. Later, as part of the design team responsible for modifying the engine and aerodynamics of the Group 5 turbocharged Stratos Silhouette, he began his long technical career, mostly dedicated to the design and testing of supercharged engines.

In 1978, following the merger of the Lancia and FIAT racing departments, he went to Abarth to design the car for the Formula FIAT Abarth, a racing series for developing young race drivers.

At the end of 1978, he worked at Osella, where he was responsible for the design of a Formula 2 car (FA2) and later of a Formula 1 car. However, he did not follow the FA1's racing campaign because, by January 1980, he was working at Ferrari.

== Ferrari Formula 1 and performance road cars (1979–1988) ==
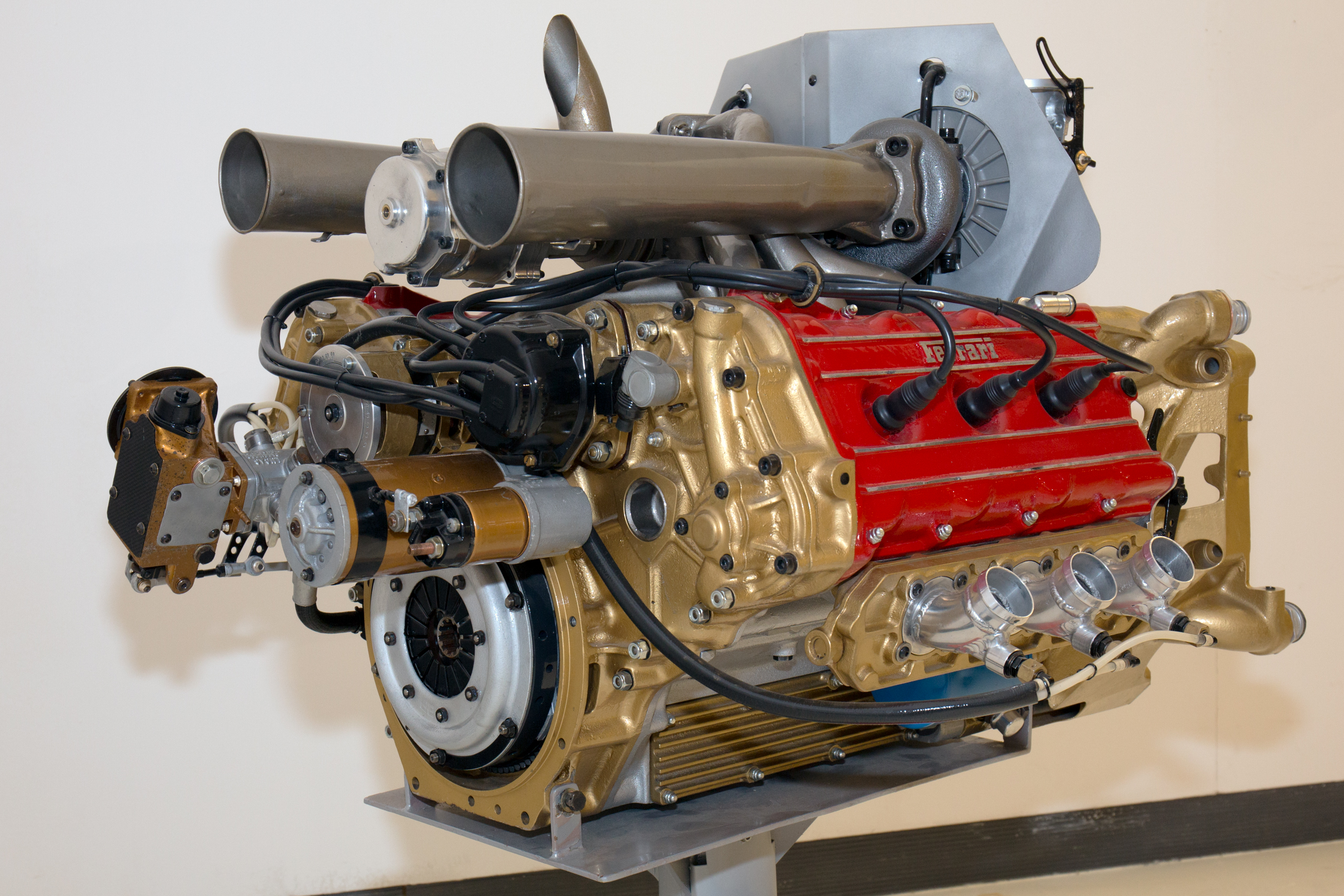
Ferrari 021 engine

In 1979, Materazzi was hired by Ferrari's racing division as head of the design/engineering office (while Mauro Forghieri remained Technical Director) due to his specialisation in forced induction, which would help the team from the 1980 season onwards. He was the main engineer responsible for the adoption of turbo engines at Ferrari.

Later, he was also assigned several production car developments, such as the engine for the 328 Turbo, Ferrari 288 GTO, 288 GTO Evoluzione, Testarossa, 412 GT. He was then directed by Enzo Ferrari, shortly before his death, to lead the development and creation of the F40, which is probably the project Materazzi is most associated with by Ferrari owners. He also designed various engines such as the type 268 used by the Lancia LC2 in endurance races.

== Working under Enzo Ferrari ==
Materazzi was notified of Enzo Ferrari's interest in hiring him by a friend who was working for Ferrari. During a telephone call, Enzo Ferrari invited Materazzi to visit his office and discuss a job offer that would involve him taking responsibility for engine development, in particular with regards to turbocharging. After the successful agreement, the company released an article in the Italian press with the title "The technical expert who knows everything about the turbo has left Osella and joined Ferrari."

Mr. Ferrari, who was 100% in control of the Gestione Sportiva (Racing Division), structured the 1981 staff with Mauro Forghieri as technical director, Angiolino Marchetti as head of vehicle design, Gianfranco Poncini as head of structural and aerodynamic calculations, and Nicola Materazzi as head of the technical office for all development of chassis and engines.

The racing department of Ferrari in the 1980s was of relatively limited size, so there was daily discussion between Ferrari, Forghieri, Materazzi, Tomaini, and other experienced engineers in the team.

Materazzi in particular was in a delicate position once the turbocharged engines started to run "in anger" on the cars, due to the need to control any reliability issues and prevent failures that would cause the drivers to retire from a race. The turbo cars were powerful, but the technology of the time was not always fully robust. Enzo Ferrari asked to anticipate the introduction of the turbo on the 126 car, while Materazzi argued that some additional time was required to prove on the dynamometers that the engine would run for the required race distances.

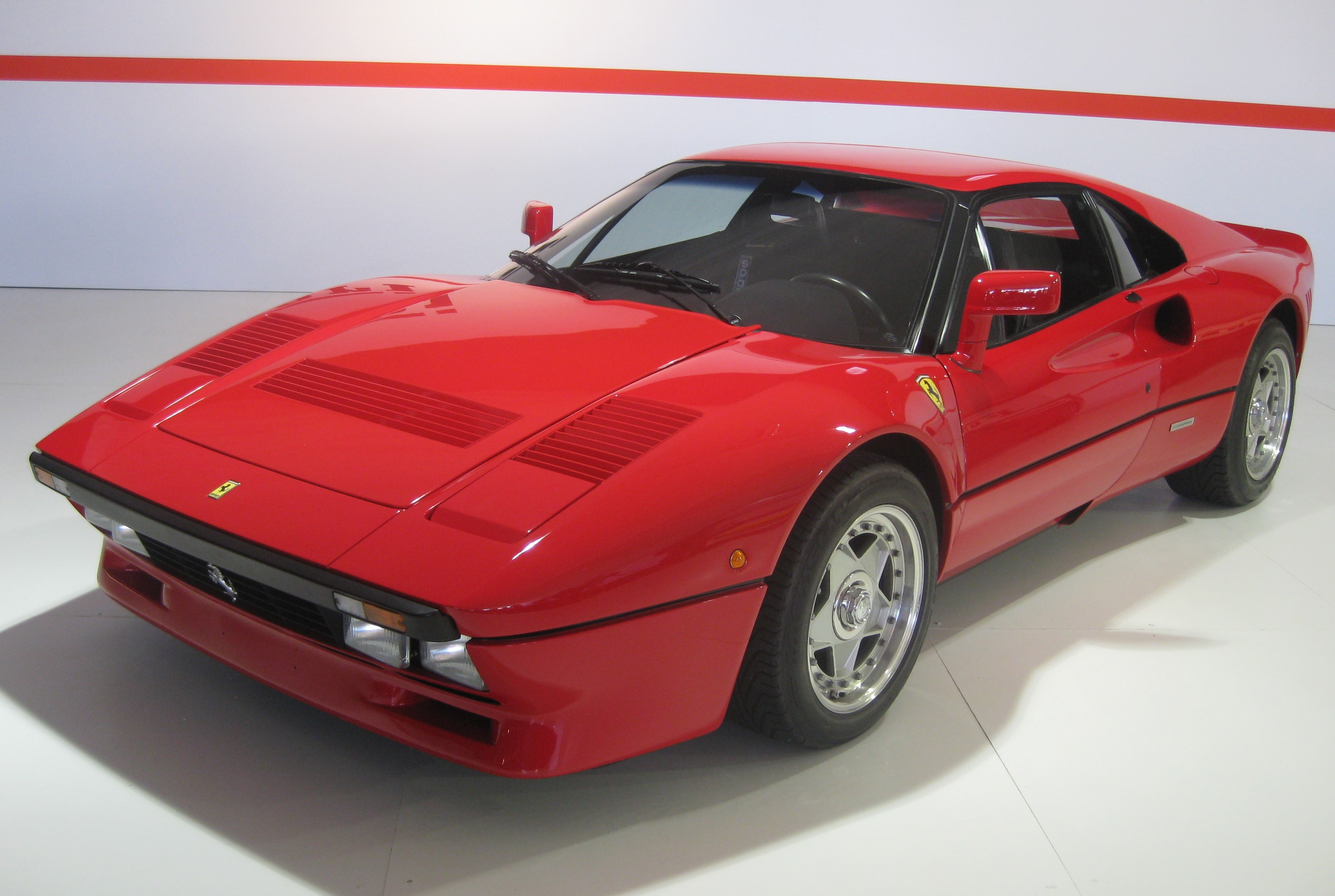
Ferrari 288 GTO

Owing in part to his total passion for engineering and in part due to not being married, Materazzi was fully dedicated to his work. Ferrari understood this driving passion and sought to encourage him to take on some issues that were predominant in the road car division, where the old man, however, did not have full control; it was FIAT who controlled the Gestione Industriale (Industrial Division). Enzo Ferrari lamented that new emissions regulations and cost economising had made the new cars "sleepy," in other words, heavy or underpowered. He felt that Materazzi could look into the powertrain designs and breathe new life into them, bringing the racing know-how into the hands of the gentleman customer.

On a late evening in Ferrari's office, the two discussed the project for an engine, where Materazzi clearly stated that a road car engine with three litres of displacement should allow for at least 400 horsepower and not merely 300, as the initial specification stated. Ferrari took this bold statement as an opportunity to delegate the responsibility to him, something Materazzi initially declined due to other racing commitments but reluctantly accepted after the insistence of the old man. The work on the engine then led to more work on the general layout of the (288) GTO vehicle, where Materazzi chose to install the engine longitudinally to allow better space and equal exhaust lengths for the turbocharging.

The GTO Evoluzione was unfortunately a victim of the cancellation of the FISA Group B championship. It was ready and should have been produced in the numbers required for homologation but for the deaths of Toivonen and Cresto. The few cars that were built were sold to a handful of enthusiasts, and one or more remained parked in a corner of the workshops. Ferrari entrusted one of the experienced test drivers to try it on the road and asked Materazzi why the car would be "killed" and if it could please be developed into a road car.

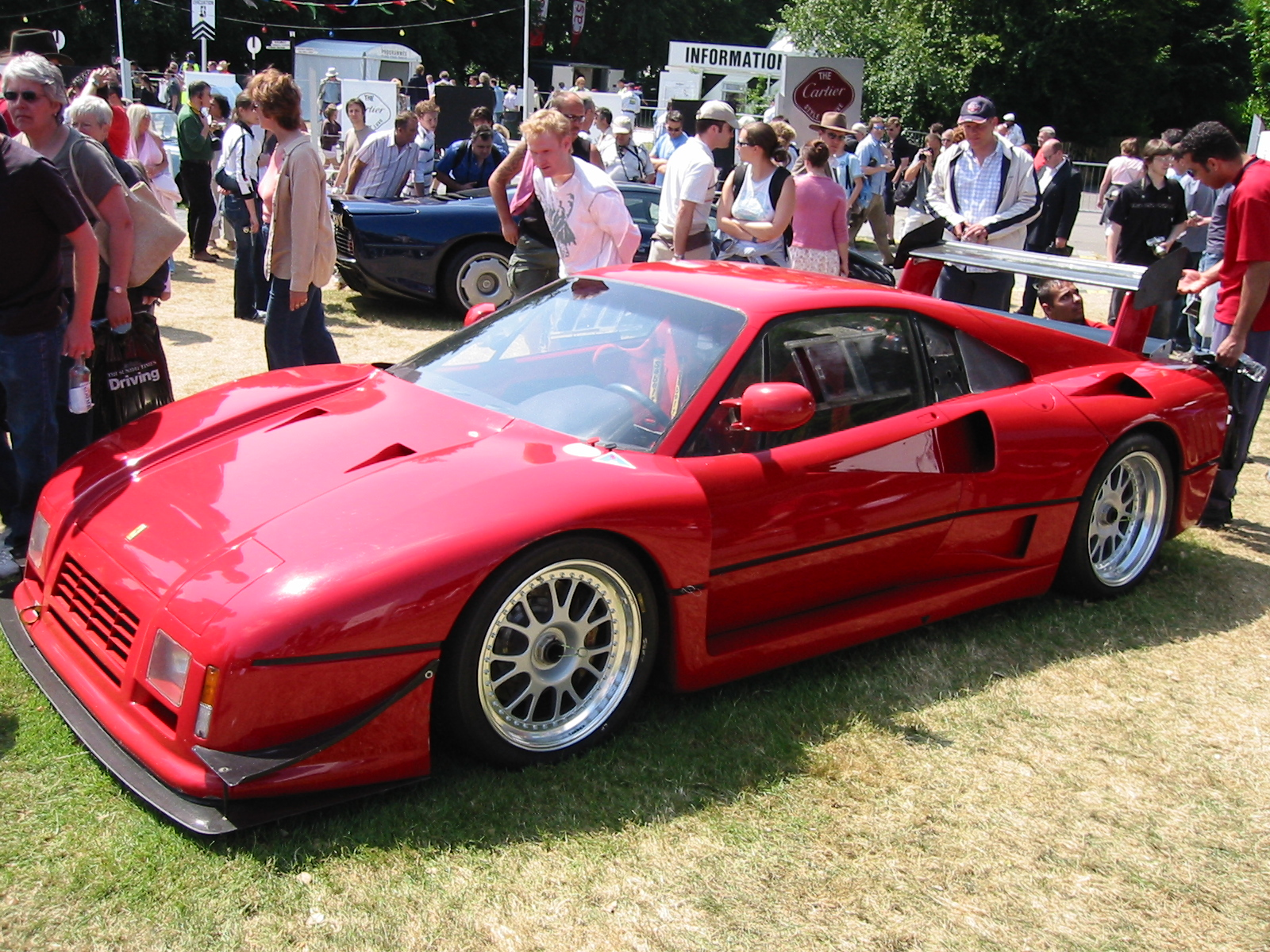
Ferrari 288 GTO Evoluzione

Materazzi pointed out to Ferrari that it would be very tricky to develop a car in a very short space of time, but that it could be possible if he did not have interference from people and politics. Ferrari thus invited Materazzi to choose his collaborators and, due to his habit of noting everything day by day in a diary, wrote down "Materazzi, no rompicoglioni": Materazzi, no ball-busters (interfering). This agreement after the meeting meant that the project for a new car (the name was not yet chosen) started on 10 June 1986. It was not possible to schedule a launch in October (Frankfurt) because that would have clashed with the Alfa Romeo 164. Instead of postponing the date, Mr. Ferrari insisted that the car be presented before the August holidays, putting considerable pressure on Materazzi to complete the work in just 12 months, which was achieved by working on week-ends and bank holidays. The car was presented to the press during a relatively low-key event at the Civic Centre in Maranello on 21 July 1987, where (from left to right) Materazzi, Fioravanti, Ferrari, and Razelli sat at the table to answer questions from the press.

The F40 was described in certain press articles as Ferrari's answer to the Porsche 959 owing to the similar release dates. Materazzi, however, confirmed that this was not possible since the Porsche Gruppe B prototype was initiated by Porsche's management (Bott & Schutz) in 1981 and manufactured from 1986 after delays in development related to the high technological content (and related workload). Materazzi always maintained that, logically, only the 288 GTO was the competitor to the 959 due to its development from 1983 to 1984, with the brief to bring more performance to the road cars which Ferrari felt were underpowered. The GTO's link with FISA Group B was predominantly an opportunity to prove the car rather than the raison d'etre of the GTO. The F40, whose development was initiated in June 1986, was a car borne out of the GTO Evoluzione but without any specific brief to match the 959 technical content (4WD, adaptive damping, etc.).

In August 1987, Enzo Ferrari decided to hand the role of technical director for the road car division to Materazzi, but because FIAT had overall control of that division, it chose instead a manager from Carraro Tractors (then part of the FIAT group). This decision led to Materazzi's departure from Ferrari and employment at the Cagiva motorcycle company, upon invitation from its MD Claudio Castiglioni.

== Motorcycles and Bugatti (1989–1997) ==
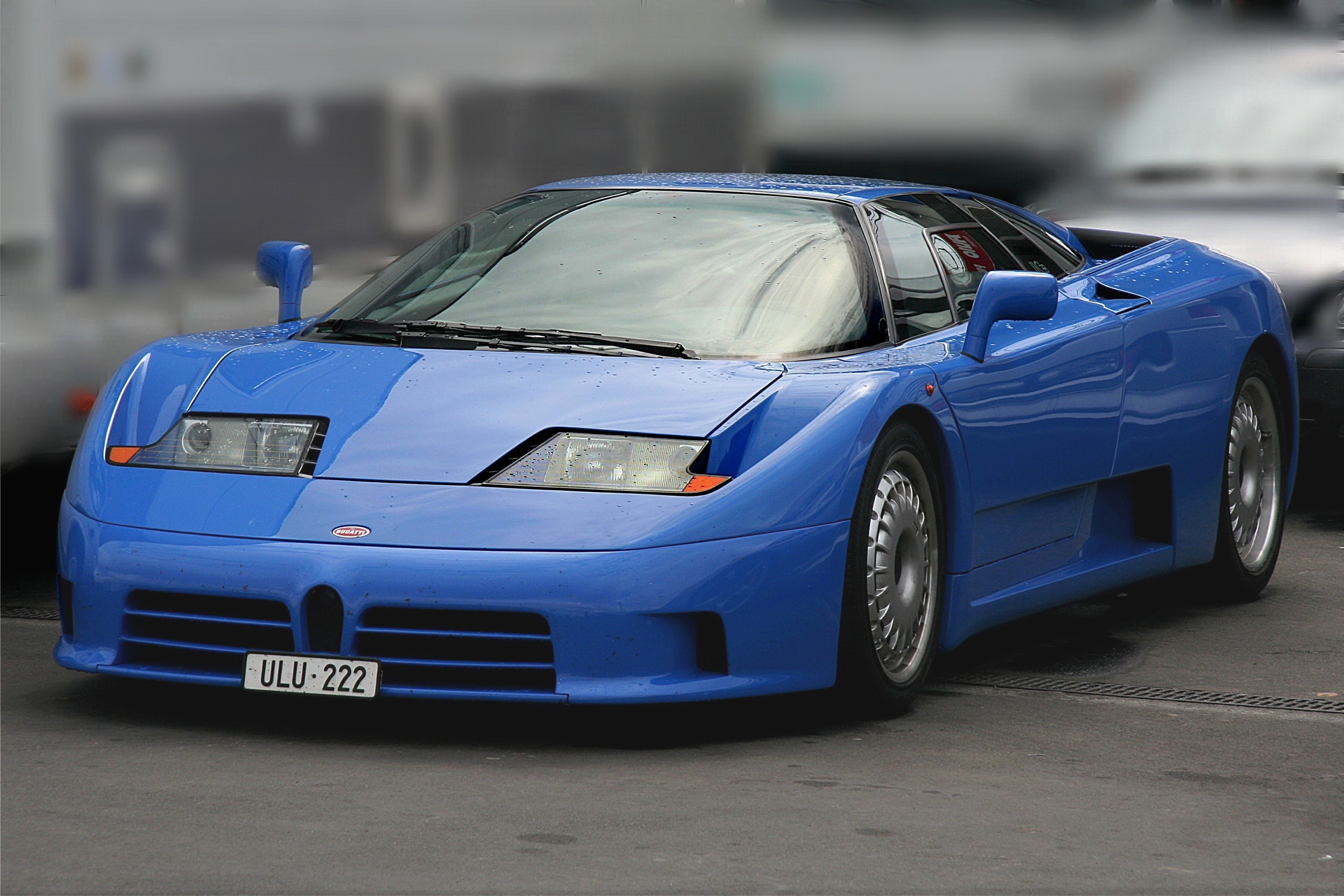
Bugatti EB 110

After leaving Ferrari, he joined Cagiva as director of the racing department from 1990 to 1991. During this time, he worked on engine and chassis technical developments for the GP500 Cagiva C589 and C591, helping riders Eddie Lawson, Randy Mamola, Alex Barros and John Kocinski win more races than the previous seasons. Massimo Tamburini was responsible for the body and aerodynamics of the motorcycles.

At the end of 1991, he was contacted by Romano Artioli to take over the Bugatti EB110 project, which was in serious difficulty after the departure of Paolo Stanzani. During this time, he engineered the switch from the prototype aluminium honeycomb chassis to a carbon-fibre chassis, resolved issues with engine reliability, and adapted the torque distribution to improve the vehicle handling. He also played a key role in the specification of the SS lightweight version. So good was the EB110 compared to its rivals during a group test by Michael Schumacher that he ordered one in yellow with a blue comfort interior.

In 1994, Materazzi assumed the technical direction of Laverda to work on the new 750cc engine.

== B Engineering Edonis (2000–2005) ==
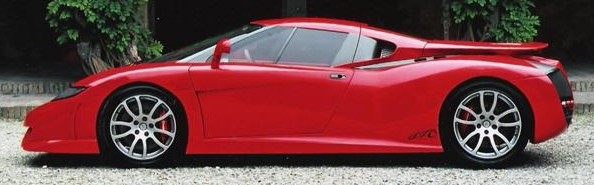
B. Engineering Edonis

The Edonis is the swan song of the Italian engineer. Development started in 2000 in order to present the car by 1 January 2001. He designed the Edonis supercar, which was presented in Modena in 2001. In the summer of 2002, French magazine Sport-Auto organised a comparison amongst supercars at the Nardo' circuit in Puglia, southern Italy. The winner was the 715 horsepower Edonis, fitted with Michelin Pax System tyres, which clocked up a record speed for the circuit of 359.6 km/h.

== Personal life ==
During his youth, Materazzi was a keen motorcyclist and passionate about go-karts. After his studies in Naples, he lived the majority of his life near Turin and Modena for work reasons. His hobby from an early age was literature, and, over the years, he built a very detailed library of technical and non-technical books.

As a knowledgeable expert in engines and engineering calculations, he was interviewed by several book authors as the authority on the Ferrari turbocharged cars of the 1980s and contributed to other worldwide articles about engine technology. He also periodically gave talks about cars and engineering. As a lover of the sea, following his retirement in 2006, he returned to his native region of Cilento, where his family had roots.
