= Bugatti EB 110 =

Mid-engine sports car

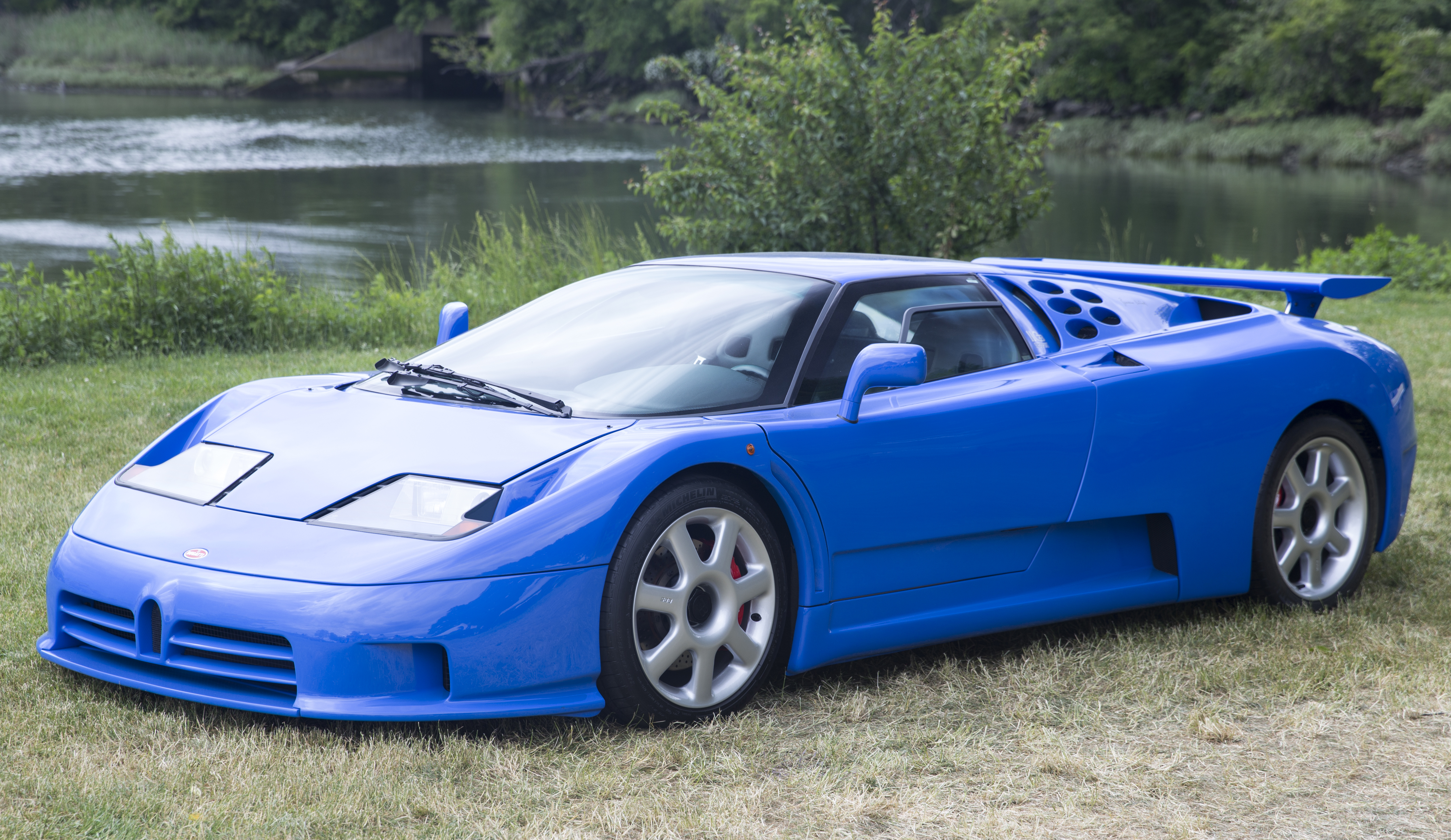
- Bugatti EB 110 Super Sport

Overview
- Manufacturer: Bugatti Automobili S.p.A.
- Production: 1991–1995; 139 produced
- Assembly: Italy: Modena, Campogalliano (Bugatti Automobili Campogalliano)
- Designer: Marcello Gandini (prototype styling); Giampaolo Benedini (production styling and interior); Paolo Stanzani, Tecnostile (prototype Chief Engineering); Nicola Materazzi (Production Chief Engineer)

Body and chassis
- Class: Sports car (S)
- Body style: 2-door coupé
- Layout: Rear mid-engine, four-wheel drive
- Doors: Scissor
- Related: B Engineering Edonis; Bugatti EB 112

Powertrain
- Engine: 3.5 L Bugatti B.110.11 quad-turbocharged V12
- Power output: GT: 412 kW (560 PS; 553 hp); Super Sport: 450 kW (612 PS; 603 hp)
- Transmission: 6-speed manual

Dimensions
- Wheelbase: 2,550 mm (100.4 in)
- Length: 4,400 mm (173.2 in)
- Width: 1,940 mm (76.4 in)
- Height: 1,114–1,125 mm (43.9–44.3 in)
- Kerb weight: 1,620 kg (3,571 lb); Super Sport: 1,418 kg (3,126 lb)

Chronology
- Predecessor: Bugatti ID90
- Successor: Bugatti Veyron

The Bugatti EB 110 is a mid-engine sports car initially conceived by Paolo Stanzani in the mid 1980s and produced by Bugatti Automobili S.p.A. from 1991 until 1995, when the company was liquidated. The model restarted the brand's presence in the automobile industry after a hiatus of nearly 40 years (since 1952).

In the period from 1992 to 1995, the EB 110 competed against cars such as the Lamborghini Diablo, Jaguar XJ220, Ferrari F40, Ferrari F50, and the McLaren F1.

139 examples were built, plus a small number of post-production cars which were completed after the bankruptcy. The last one was built by Dauer Sportwagen in 2002 and one additional unfinished example was completed in 2019. It was the only production model made by Romano Artioli's Italian incarnation of Bugatti.

== History ==
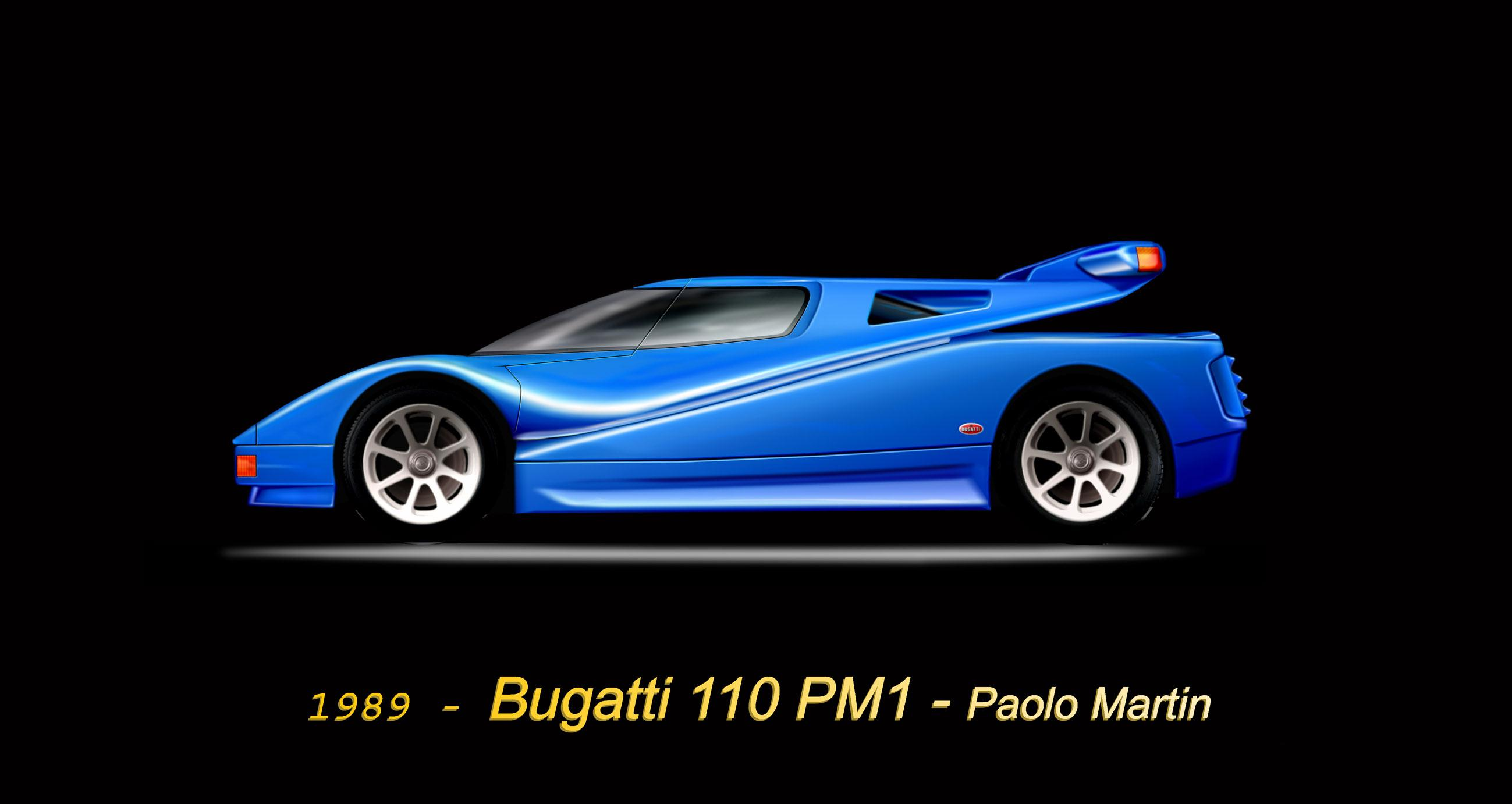
A concept drawing of the EB 110 proposal by Paolo Martin

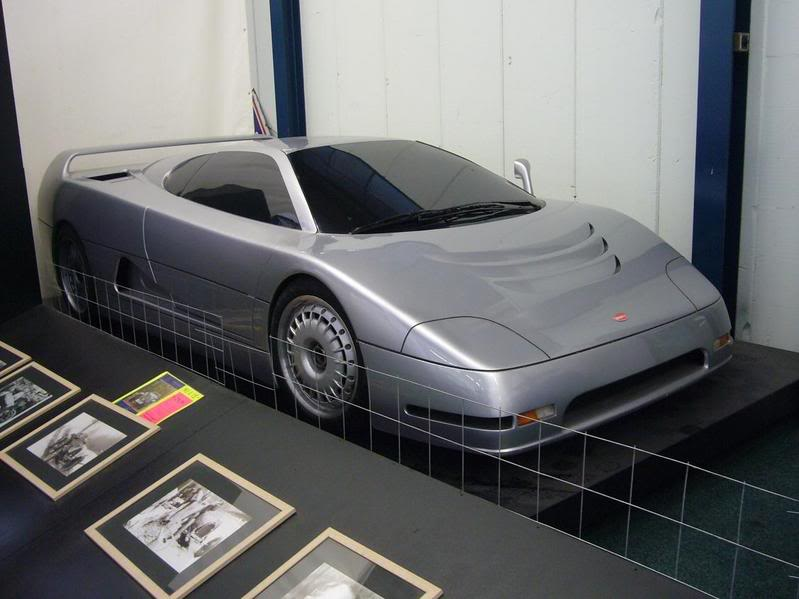
An early styling proposal by Marcello Gandini

Discussions of a new supercar had taken place between Ferruccio Lamborghini and Paolo Stanzani at the end of 1984 during telephone calls and at the Turin Auto Show. Stanzani warned Lamborghini that developing a new car was increasingly tough financially and that the engine development was a possible task but the bodywork would be resource intensive. He suggested that Nuccio Bertone could provide help with the bodywork design and manufacture. Bertone was involved in early talks for a collaboration on the exterior design but declined to continue the discussions after noting the conflict of interest that the potential majority investor, Autoexpo (and Romano Artioli), had in its distribution contracts of Ferrari cars in Germany. Jean-Marc Borel established the holding companies together with Artioli's lawyer. On 11 May 1987 Autoexpo paid 7,500,00 French Francs to Messier Hispano Bugatti (Snecma Safran Aircraft Engines) for the purchase of the Bugatti brand and on 14 October 1987 Bugatti Automobili S.p.A. was founded.

Stanzani, minority shareholder in Bugatti Automobili was chosen as company Technical Director and sole Managing Director ('Amministratore Unico' in Italian) thanks to his career experience with Lamborghini vehicles including the Miura, Countach, Espada, Urraco, Jarama, Jalpa.

== Initial development ==
Stanzani had given the new supercar the code FL12, shorthand notation for 'Ferruccio Lamborghini 12-cylinder' and its development started in 1986 on the engine and chassis, with work being led by Stanzani and design/development carried out by Oliviero Pedrazzi and the engineers/draughtsmen at Tecnostile. The trio of Oliviero Pedrazzi, Achille Bevini and Tiziano Benedetti had worked on the Lamborghini Miura chassis and engine development as well as the Lamborghini Urraco and Lamborghini Countach, a successful Stanzani-conceived car that had carried Lamborghini through times of financial ups and down in the worldwide economies. Benedetti, Bevini and Pedrazzi had subsequently established their own company which was known to Ferruccio Lamborghini and Paolo Stanzani who were involved in early talks with Romano Artioli. Tecnostile was involved in several projects, including the transversely mounted V16 engine of the Cizeta (formerly Cizeta-Moroder V16T) for Claudio Zampolli (ex-Lamborghini employee).

During the early phases of the project, development was entirely carried out by Tecnostile at their workshops in via Don Milani #102, Modena. Pedrazzi focused on engine and chassis design, Bevini on bodywork and Benedetti on relations with suppliers. Amongst the employees was Maurizio Reggiani who had previously worked as engine designer in Maserati.

Several employees from Lamborghini joined the newborn Bugatti project on the basis of their trust in Stanzani. One of these was Lamborghini test driver Loris Bicocchi who was employee #7 in Campogalliano. He would patiently wait one year before beginning early testing of the EB 110 prototype.

== Engine and chassis ==
Engine and chassis development was led by Stanzani and design/drawing was done by Pedrazzi as leader of the engineers and draughtsmen in Tecnostile. Pedrazzi had experience of engine design since his work in Ferrari under the supervision of Bizzarrini (250 GTO) and in Lamborghini.

The power would come from a 'small' displacement V12 engine, with a 3500 cc swept volume that mirrored the requirements of the Formula 1 rules of 1987. The naturally aspirated form did not produce sufficient torque and power for a supercar and Stanzani had envisaged the usage of turbocharging. The choice of engine configuration, size and turbocharging was for technical, marketing and strategic reasons. The choice of four turbochargers was primarily due to the expected lag (compressor and turbine rotational inertia) that two larger turbochargers might have had.

The chassis utilised a planar (flat) material made by two aluminium skins (typically 0.9 to 1.5mm thick) separated by aluminium honeycomb (typically 8 to 12mm thick), all bonded by epoxy glue. The sheets were cut to dimension and then glued and riveted to form a 3-dimensional shape for the chassis. The choice of carbon skins sandwiching aluminium or Nomex honeycomb was not adopted by Stanzani due to the lack of experience in manufacture and repair in Italy. Furthermore the aluminium-aluminium material was more cost-effective.

== Styling and early prototype testing ==
Several designers received copies of the chassis drawings in order to propose styling for the bodywork: Paolo Martin, Giorgetto Giugiaro, Bertone and Marcello Gandini. Bertone proposed a design prepared by Marc Deschamps (who went on to style the B.Engineering Edonis in 1999) but soon after lost interest in the project. That same design would be presented again as Bertone Lotus Emotion. Giugiaro's Bugatti ID90 prototype was presented some time later at the 1990 Turin Auto Show. Martin's proposal was avantgarde but rejected by the Bugatti management.

Gandini gained wider acceptance by being well known to Stanzani and having worked on the styling of many successful performance cars: Lamborghini Miura, Lancia Stratos Zero and the production Lancia Stratos, Alfa Romeo Carabo, Alfa Romeo Montreal, Cizeta-Moroder V16T. He would design the Lamborghini Diablo soon after.

Initial prototypes based on Gandini's design were bodied by carrozzeria Ilas; these began testing in 1991.

== Restyling ==
Bugatti's President was not happy with Gandini's angular design language incorporating a shovel nose and flared rear wheel arches. According to Gandini, Trucco and Stanzani, Artioli did not formally state his rejection of the original styling because he had in fact approved the 1:1 scale model. Later interviews with Giampaolo Benedini revealed more detail on the fact that Artioli had asked him to propose some alternative design ideas for the car to go into production.

Artioli did not favour the aluminium honeycomb chassis proposed by Stanzani. Stanzani defended the choice of the aluminium-aluminium honeycomb chassis on the basis of being sufficiently stiff (in torsion and bending) while being cost-effective and repairable. Artioli pushed for a carbon-aluminium chassis on the basis of his concern with safety and due to the likely popularity of carbon composite in cutting edge supercars of the future.

Gandini made a second iteration of the design with softer lines, revised front and rear lights, and subtly different proportions for the rear wheel arches – styling cues also visible in the Maserati Chubasco of 1990. The second Gandini design replaced the network of cooling ducts on the bonnet with ducts in the front bumper and at the outer flanks of the two large fixed headlamps which replaced the early prototype's pop-up units. The scissor doors, the large windshield, and the side window design were retained. This design was only possible for a Bugatti once Maserati had decided not to construct a supercar and therefore declined to take on the Chubasco proposal. The first Gandini prototype styling and the restyling were separated by approximately 2 years. Artioli, however, still was not fully convinced of the exterior design and wanted further detail design changes which Gandini refused to make because they would alter its DNA: for example the shape of the front intake and the placement of the Bugatti 'shoe-horse'. Artioli thus tasked Gianpaolo Benedini (who had designed the "Blue Factory") to make the requested changes. Benedini made small changes by placing a very small 'shoe-horse' at the front air intake and took responsibility of the interior design together with Laurens van den Acker of Design System.

== Change of chassis material ==
Artioli had from the beginning been against the use of the aluminium and aluminium honeycomb chassis material. He based his decision on the fact that racing drivers had lost their life with such a chassis (for example Gilles Villeneuve, where the seat belt mounts had torn off the chassis); he was also concerned that the material was soft and the skins and honeycomb would separate on slow speed impacts of the chassis against kerbs and other road objects.

Stanzani asked quotes from Aerospatiale for the supply of carbon-composite material to understand the benefits versus costs. He discussed at length with Aerospatiale the technical details and critical aspects of the chassis. The French company presented proposals (quotes) for aluminium skins with aluminium honeycomb core and an alternative with carbon-fibre skins and honeycomb core. Stanzani viewed the carbon-aluminium quote as financially not viable for Bugatti Automobili and reported this to Artioli. After Stanzani's departure, further meetings were held between Dario Trucco (consulting on the overall delivery of the bodywork) and Oliviero Pedrazzi and the staff from Aerospatiale (Jean-Jacques Bodu, Georges Teyssier, Roland Bignolais) in the period of 4-5 September 1990, where Aerospatiale discussed the usage of the composite material in aircraft and certain details pertaining to manufacturing and crash impact resistance.

At a later stage tests were done on the torsional stiffness of the chassis in their two respective materials (both tests conducted without the upper steel roof tubular structure, so just the 'tub'). The composite material proved stiffer but according to Trucco and Pedrazzi also heavier and significantly more expensive.

The carbon fibre chassis kept the same dimensions and panel split lines as designed by Pedrazzi in the original aluminium and aluminium honeycomb design, giving the car improved stiffness which allowed it to better achieve its targets of ride and handling. The chassis consisted of separate panels that were bonded and riveted together to remove the need for very large autoclaves.

== Departure of Stanzani and arrival of Materazzi ==
Conflicts of opinion on the company direction between Stanzani and Artioli led to the respective departure of Gandini and Stanzani from the project. Stanzani's original vehicle concept was technologically advanced (4WD, turbo, short wheelbase) and relatively light in terms of interior features. Artioli on the other hand wanted the car to represent the Bugatti brand and therefore include well appointed soft seats and electrical switches, which would add several hundred kilograms to the final kerb weight of the EB 110.

Artioli had increased the capital in the venture, thereby diluting Stanzani's share, and had started to take more involvement in vehicle development compared to previously.

The role of technical director was filled by Nicola Materazzi, who had experience of working with Lancia, Abarth, Osella, Ferrari, Cagiva (and later Laverda), and had been Chief Engineer for the Lancia Stratos GR5, Ferrari 288 GTO Evoluzione, Ferrari F40 and Cagiva C589.

Materazzi had primarily a racing car background and a reputation for making minimalist performance cars, as evidenced by the 288 GTO Evoluzione and F40. His view of performance cars was evidently different from that of Romano Artioli and this would eventually lead to similar conflict as Artioli had had with Stanzani.

One of the first tasks for Materazzi was that of following the work at Aerospatiale with the simulation and physical torsional stiffness tests of the composite chassis.

Materazzi brought his engines experience (on Ferrari Testarossa, Ferrari 328 Turbo, Ferrari 288 GTO and Ferrari F40) to solve the problem which was affecting the engine's durability on the dynamometer: excessive friction between titanium con-rods in contact. He then moved on to re-calculating the vehicle front to rear torque distribution. Test drivers Jean-Philippe Vittecoq and Loris Bicocchi stated that the cars were understeering too much so Materazzi altered the torque distribution from 40:60 to 27:73 and the drivers were satisfied with the handling improvement. The initial torque distribution had been calculated based on the static weight distribution of the vehicle and in similar way to rally vehicles of the 1980s (such as the Audi Quattro). The updated torque distribution was calculated based on the dynamic load distribution under acceleration, which takes into account of load transfer (vehicle mass * acceleration * centre of gravity height / wheelbase).

Materazzi attended aerodynamic testing at the Pininfarina wind tunnel and instructed changes to the front air intake (to the radiators) and its outlet to allow the radiator to function effectively, a detail which had been neglected by the Gandini/Benedini style.

The car was released with many innovative technologies that were scarcely used by the automotive industry at the time, such as a carbon fibre monocoque chassis, active aerodynamics, quad turbocharging (two per cylinder bank) and an all-wheel-drive system for safer handling (especially on wet roads). In particular the 4WD system had been a cornerstone of the Stanzani design that Ferrari was unable to productionise successfully (Forghieri had only built a prototype of the 408 4RM) and that Lamborghini would introduce only in 1993 with the Diablo VT ('Viscous Transmission').

The design elements of the car paid homage to the distinctive Bugatti automobiles of the past. The name EB 110 is an abbreviation for the company's founder, Ettore Bugatti and his 110th birthday (born 15 Sep 1881).

== Unveiling ==
The Bugatti EB 110 GT was unveiled on 14 September 1991 in front of the Grande Arche de la Défense, near Paris. An evening gala was held at Versailles with 1700 guests. A continued launch day was held in Molsheim on 15 September, exactly 110 years after Ettore Bugatti's birth.

A lighter and more powerful variant with 450 kW (612 PS; 603 hp) called the EB 110 Super Sport was introduced at the 1992 Geneva Motor Show just six months after the introduction of the GT. The Super Sport variant was lighter than the GT by 150 kg (330 lb) which was achieved by the use of carbon-fibre body panels on the exterior and in the interior. The Super Sport could attain a top speed of 355 km/h (221 mph) and could accelerate from 0–100 km/h (62 mph) in 3.2 seconds.

Early in 1994, Formula One driver Michael Schumacher purchased a yellow EB 110 Super Sport, giving the company a great deal of publicity. Soon after this, the car that Schumacher bought gained further publicity when Schumacher accidentally crashed his EB 110 into a truck and blamed "inadequate brakes" for the crash. Despite this, the car was repaired and Schumacher retained the car until 2003.

Derek Hill, son of American Formula One champion Phil Hill, was one of three drivers on a team that competed with an EB 110 in the United States at the 1996 24 Hours of Daytona.

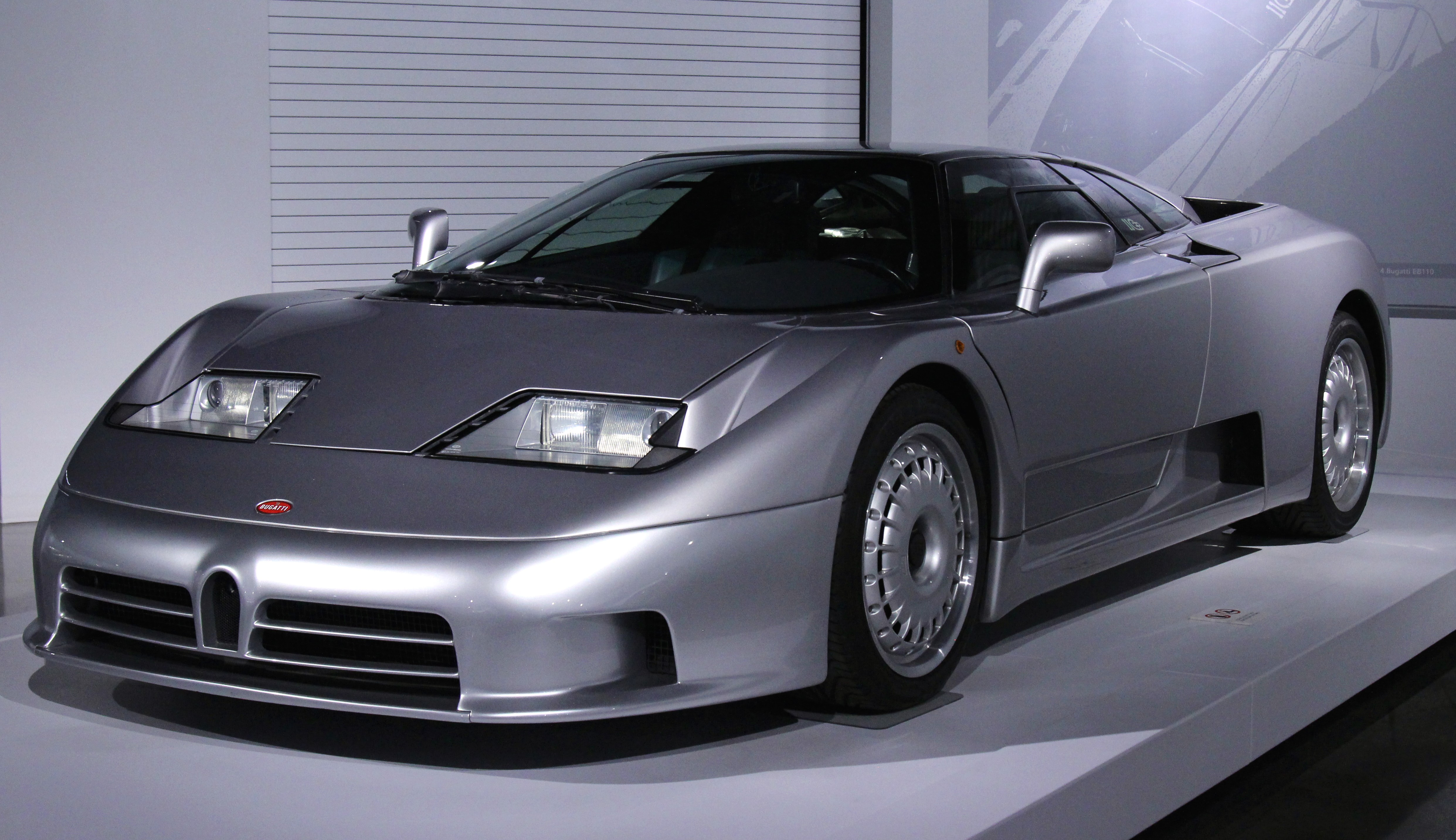
1994 Bugatti EB 110 GT

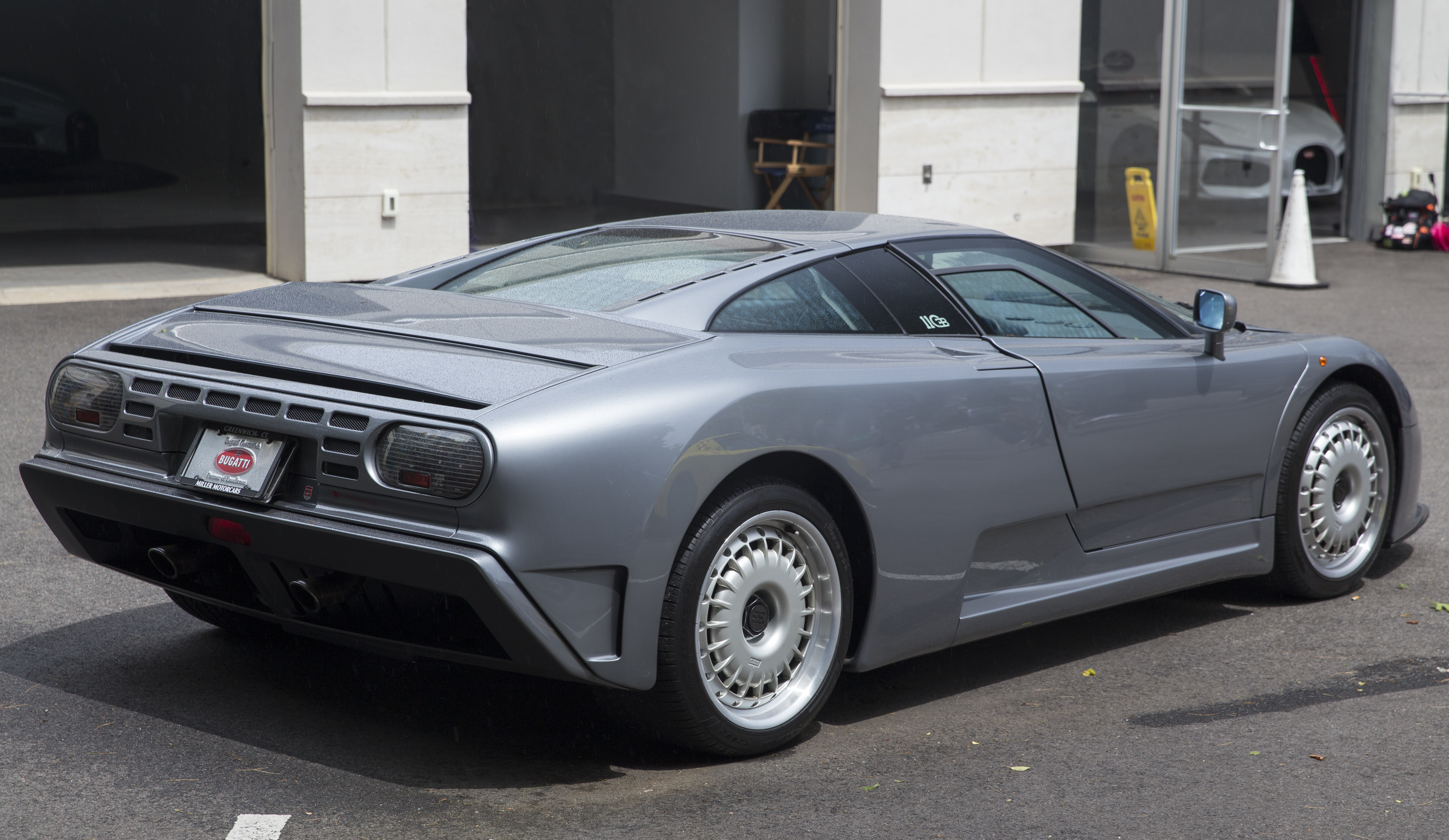
Rear view of EB 110 GT

== Departure of Materazzi and arrival of Forghieri ==
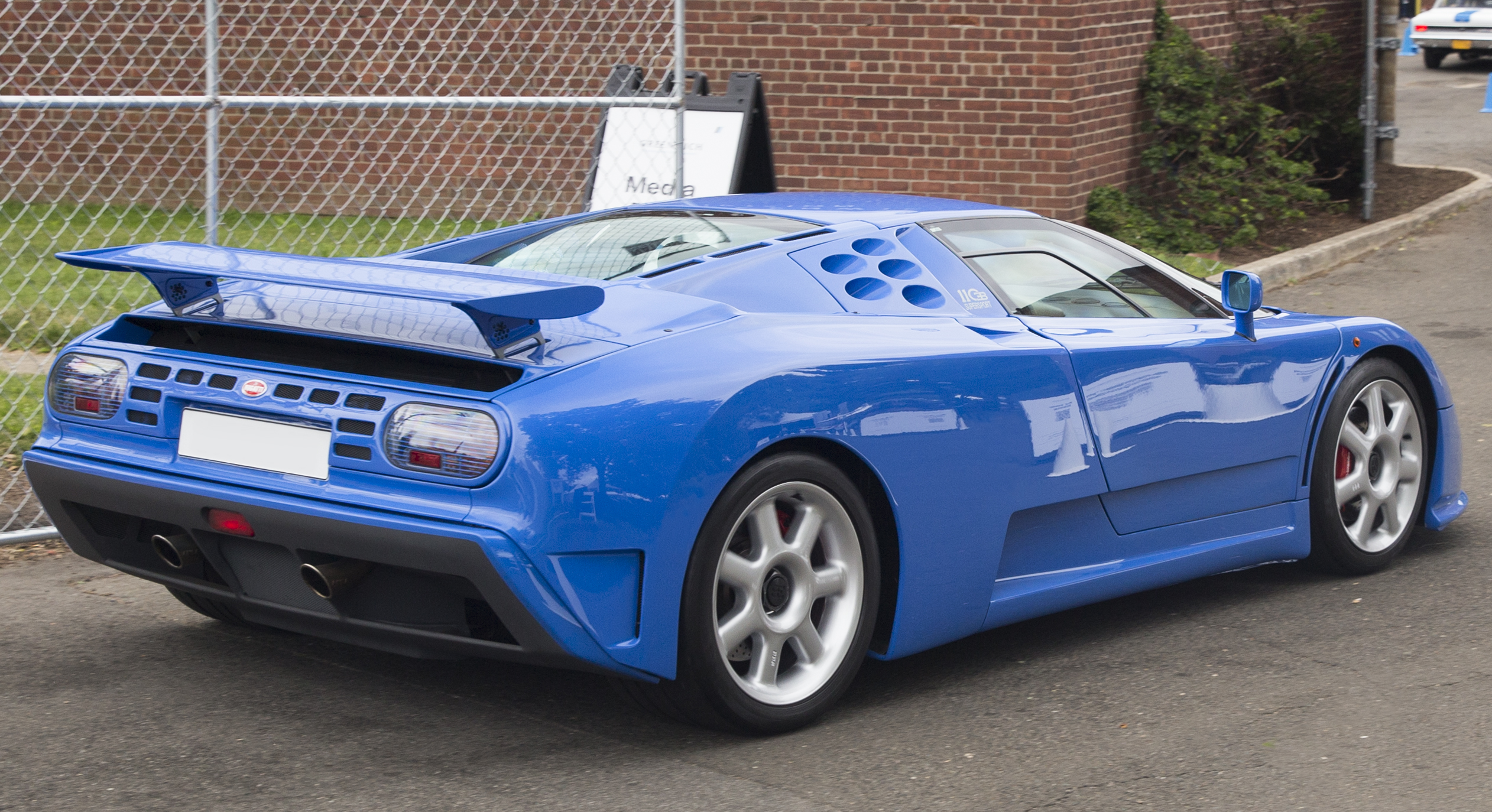
1995 EB 110 Super Sport in Blu Bugatti, rear view

Nicola Materazzi left the company in December 1992 after irreconcilable differences with president Romano Artioli. Materazzi was typically focused on minimalist cars with little regard to marketing. Artioli was much more focused on the marketing potential of the vehicle as well as its role in representing the glorious brand. The two had diametrically opposite viewpoints. Materazzi had been in favour of a light car, preferably with two-wheel-drive and two instead of four turbochargers but had obliged with the continuation of the specification wanted by Artioli. Furthermore Materazzi was against the deviation of focus and finances towards the EB112. A late evening discussion led to Materazzi's decision to part ways with Bugatti Automobili.

Mauro Forghieri stepped into the role of technical director and remained until mid 1994. During this time he oversaw the development of the EB112, whose 'hands on' development was carried out by Oliviero Pedrazzi and colleagues. Forghieri sought to used his experience to lower the cost of the vehicle but most of the designs and contracts were already in place. He also proposed to Artioli and Benedini some options for a smaller Bugatti that would allow the company to improve its finances: this was the EB120 styled by Steve Bernaud. Zagato designer Norihiko Harada produced sketches and renderings for a convertible or targa version of the EB 110.

== Company financial difficulties ==
Hard times hit the company in 1995 and the company was bankrupt as a result of several factors:

- chairman Artioli's purchase of Lotus Cars for ~£30m ($50m)
- the company's expenditure to develop the EB112 four door saloon
- the missed payments to several suppliers since 1993.

Dauer Racing GmbH of Nuremberg, Germany, bought the semi-finished EB 110 cars in the assembly plant plus the parts inventory through the bankruptcy trustee. The remaining chassis were later developed by B Engineering into their Edonis sports car which uses the monocoque chassis of the EB 110 combined with a modified version of its engine, enlarged to 3.8 litres of displacement.

== Specifications ==
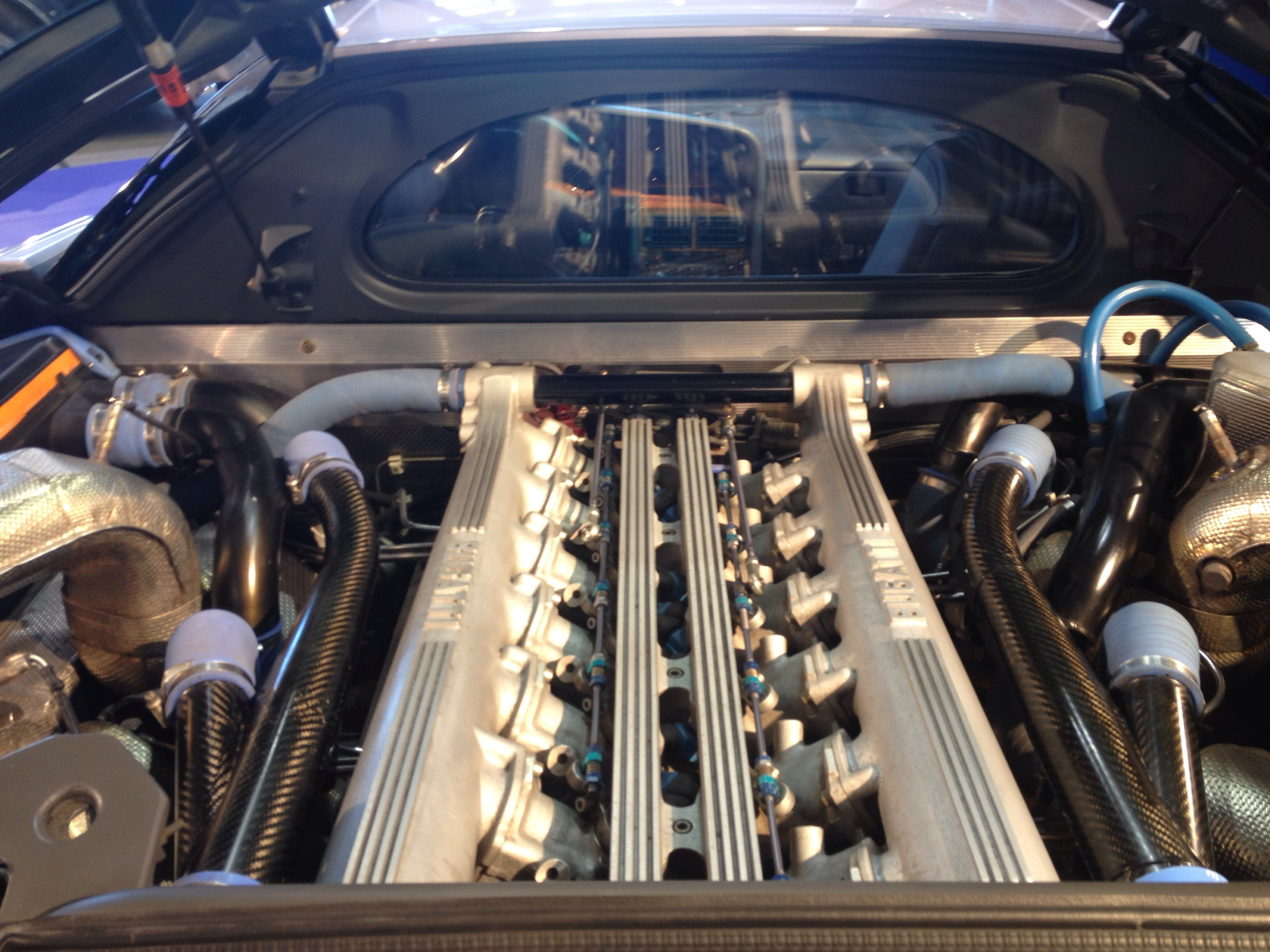
the quad-turbocharged V12 engine used in the EB 110 GT

The car has a 60-valve, quad-turbocharged V12 engine fed through 12 individual throttle bodies, powering all four wheels through a six-speed manual transmission. The 3,500 cc (3.5 L; 213.6 cu in) engine has a bore x stroke of 81 mm × 56.6 mm (3.19 in × 2.23 in). The EB 110 GT had a power output of 412 kW (560 PS; 553 hp) at 8,000 rpm and 611 N⋅m (451 lb⋅ft) of torque at 3,750 rpm. The performance oriented Super Sport version had the engine tuned to a maximum power output of 450 kW (612 PS; 603 hp) at 8,250 rpm and 650 N⋅m (479 lb⋅ft) of torque at 4,200 rpm.

The car uses a double wishbone suspension mounted to a chassis made from carbon fibre skins bonded to aluminium honeycomb. Equipped with Gandini's trademark scissor doors, it has a glass engine cover that provides a view of the V12 engine. The GT is equipped with a speed-sensitive electronic rear wing and active air flaps near the rear window that can be raised at the flick of a switch manually, while the Super Sport has a fixed rear wing.

== Performance ==
Official performance numbers for the Bugatti EB 110 GT are 0–60 mph (97 km/h) in 3.4 seconds, 0–100 km/h (62 mph) in 3.46 seconds and a top speed of 342 km/h (212.5 mph).

Auto, Motor und Sport tested a Bugatti EB 110 GT with its engine generating a power output of 412 kW (560 PS; 553 hp) and published the following results:

- 0–80 km/h (50 mph): 2.6 seconds
- 0–100 km/h (62 mph): 3.6 seconds
- 0–140 km/h (87 mph): 6.5 seconds
- 0–180 km/h (112 mph): 10.8 seconds
- 0–200 km/h (124 mph): 14.0 seconds
- Standing kilometre: 21.3 seconds
- Top speed: 336 km/h (209 mph)

French automotive magazine Sport auto recorded a 0–100 km/h (62 mph) acceleration in 3.5 seconds, 0–1000 m time of 21.2 seconds and a top speed of 338 km/h (210 mph).

Autocar tested the EB 110 GT on 16 March 1994:

- 0–30 mph (48 km/h): 2.1 seconds
- 0–97 km/h (60 mph): 4.5 seconds
- 0–161 km/h (100 mph): 9.6 seconds
- 0–241 km/h (150 mph): 23.2 seconds
- 0–400 metre: 12.8 seconds at 185 km/h (115 mph)
- 0–1000 metre: 22.9 seconds at 241 km/h (150 mph)
- Braking 97–0 km/h (60–0 mph): 2.8 seconds

Official performance numbers for the Bugatti EB 110 SS are 0–60 mph (97 km/h) in 3.14 seconds, 0–100 km/h (62 mph) in 3.26 seconds and a top speed of 355 km/h (220.6 mph).

Road & Track tested a Bugatti EB 110 Super Sport and published the following results:

- 0–30 mph (48 km/h): 2.2 seconds
- 0–40 mph (64 km/h): 2.7 seconds
- 0–50 mph (80 km/h): 3.4 seconds
- 0–60 mph (97 km/h): 4.4 seconds
- 0–70 mph (113 km/h): 5.3 seconds
- 0–80 mph (129 km/h): 6.8 seconds
- 0–90 mph (145 km/h): 7.8 seconds
- 0–100 mph (161 km/h): 9.1 seconds
- 0–110 mph (177 km/h): 10.9 seconds
- 0–120 mph (193 km/h): 12.6 seconds
- Standing 1/4 mile (402 m): 12.5 seconds at 119.5 mph (192.3 km/h)
- Braking 60–0 mph (97–0 km/h): 112 ft
- Braking 80–0 mph (129–0 km/h): 209 ft

The testers suspected that the acceleration numbers could be lowered considerably by using the clutch more recklessly than they did.

French magazine Sport auto measured 0–100 km/h (62 mph) in 3.3 seconds, 0–400 m in 11.0 seconds, 0–1000 m in 19.8 seconds and a top speed of 351 km/h (218 mph) for the EB 110 Super Sport.

== Records ==
On 24 May 1992 Jean-Philippe Vittecoq drove an EB 110 GT to an average speed (across 6 runs) of 342.7 km/h at Nardo' Proving Ground in Puglia, Italy, beating the official speed of 325 set by the Lamborghini Diablo.

On 30 May 1993 Vittecoq drove a Bugatti EB 110 SS to 355 km/h again at Nardo'. For a short time this was a speed record, until it was surpassed by the McLaren F1 which reached 386.4 km/h in 1998 at Ehra-Lessien, Germany, in the hands of Andy Wallace (racing driver).

On 3 July 1994 at Nardo' Loris Bicocchi drove an EB 110 GT powered by methane fuel to a speed of 344.7 km/h.

On 2 March 1995 Monegasque Gildo Pallanca Pastor drove an EB 110 with dedicated wheels and studded tyres in Oulu, Finland, reaching an average speed of 296.34 km/h and peak speed of 315 km/h.

During testing at the Nürburgring Nordschleife, the EB 110 prototype could complete the lap in a time of 7 minutes 44 seconds according to test driver Loris Bicocchi. This time was faster than that of 7:46.36 set unofficially by the Jaguar XJ220.

== EB 110 continuation cars ==
=== Dauer EB 110 ===
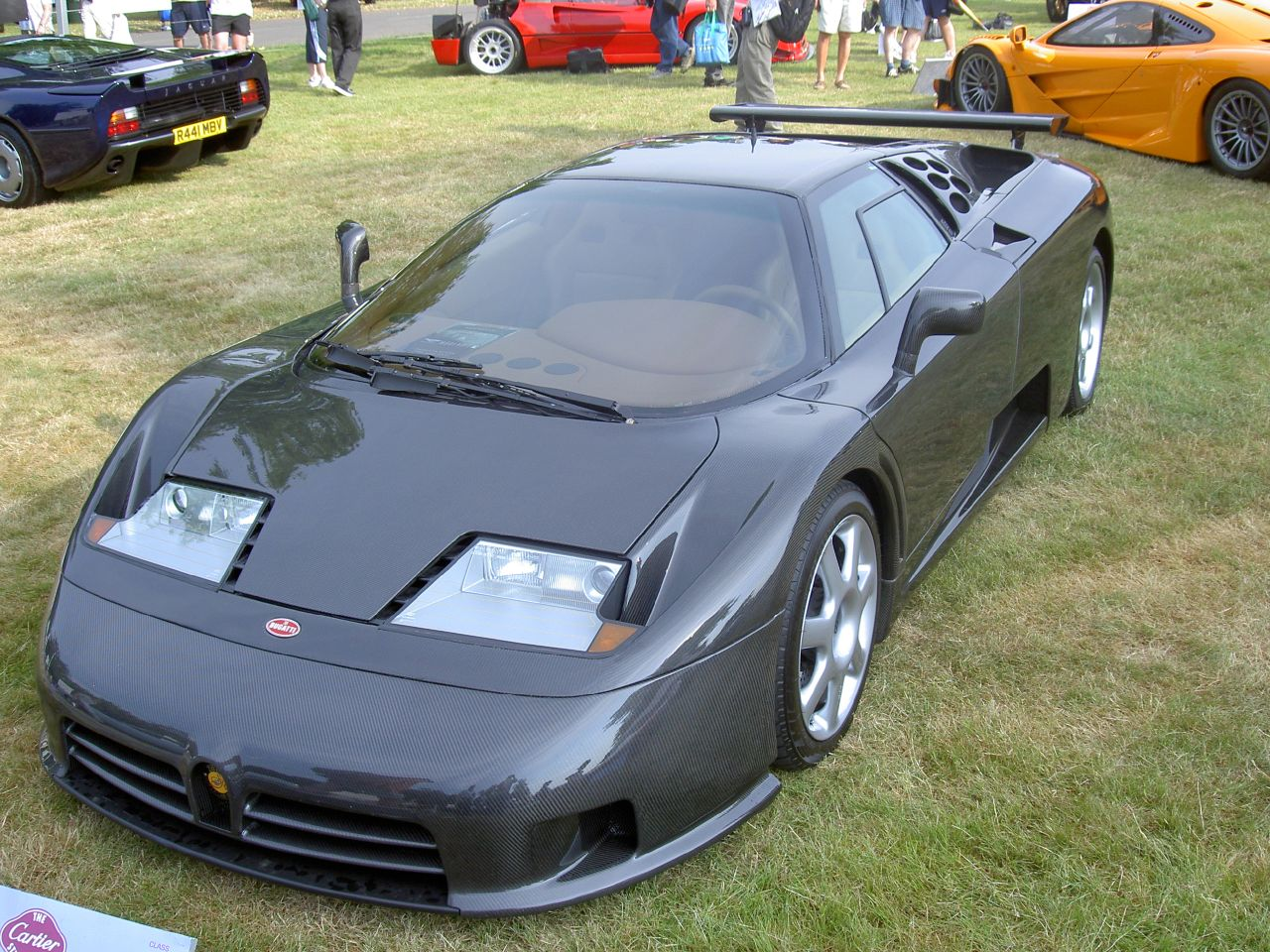
Dauer EB 110.

Dauer Sportwagen in Nuremberg, Germany, bought the remaining stock of EB 110 parts from the Bugatti factory after the company went bankrupt in 1995. A complete spare parts catalogue, with exploded diagrams and part numbers was made by the company. Three Super Sport models and a GT model were finished between 1999 and 2000 with the Bugatti logo and minor modifications.

The remaining incomplete chassis were used between 2001 and 2002 to manufacture five significantly improved cars called the Dauer EB 110 Super Sport Light Weight. Power output was increased to 481 kW (654 PS; 645 hp), turbo lag was decreased and weight was reduced by 230 kg (507 lb) with the use of a body made from carbon fibre. Top speed of the car was estimated at 370 km/h (230 mph), acceleration from a standstill to 97 km/h takes 3.3 seconds and the car covers the standing kilometre in 19 seconds. A power output increase to 526 kW (715 PS; 705 hp) with sports exhaust and modified ECU was available as factory option.

The company Dauer Sportwagen went bankrupt in 2008. All original Bugatti parts, including the high performance parts of the EB 110 Super Sport and the equipment, were bought in 2011 by the company Toscana-Motors GmbH located in Kaiserslautern, Germany.

== Cars based on the EB 110 ==
=== B Engineering Edonis ===
The B Engineering Edonis is based on the Bugatti EB 110 Super Sport but has been extensively re-engineered, retaining little more than the carbon-fibre chassis from the original Bugatti sports car. It was conceived by Nicola Materazzi and styled by Marc Deschamps and introduced in 2000 with a complete exterior and interior redesign. The 3.5-litre Bugatti engine has had its displacement increased from 3,500 cc to 3,760 cc. The original four small IHI turbochargers have been replaced by two larger units from the same manufacturer. Engine power has been increased from 450 kW (603 hp) and 650 N⋅m (479 lb⋅ft) of torque to 507 kW (689 PS; 680 hp) at 8,000 rpm and 735 N⋅m (542 lb⋅ft) of torque. A version with 720 bhp set a speed of 359.6 km/h at the Nardo' proving ground in Italy.

In addition, the four-wheel-drive triple-differential drivetrain from the donor car has been replaced with a much simpler and lighter rear-wheel-drive transaxle, thus saving approximately 70 kg (154 lb) from the total weight. The car weighing 1,500 kg (3,307 lb) has a power-to-weight ratio of 480 hp/ton. In addition, the engine's specific power output is an unprecedented 181 hp/litre. The brand claims a maximum speed of 365 km/h (227 mph) while acceleration from 0 to 100 km/h (62 mph) being achieved in 3.9 seconds. All changes were aimed at simplifying the vehicle.

B Engineering produced 2 prototypes of the Edonis (one in gold colour and one in 'Rosso Pompeiano' red) out of the parts retained by the company of the original EB 110 when Bugatti S.p.A. went bankrupt. The project had caught the interest of Hispano Suiza but the discussions broke down over the valuation of the project in view of a sale.

Apart from manufacturing the Edonis, B Engineering also provided spare parts and service for the original EB 110 until 2023.

== Aftermarket modifications ==
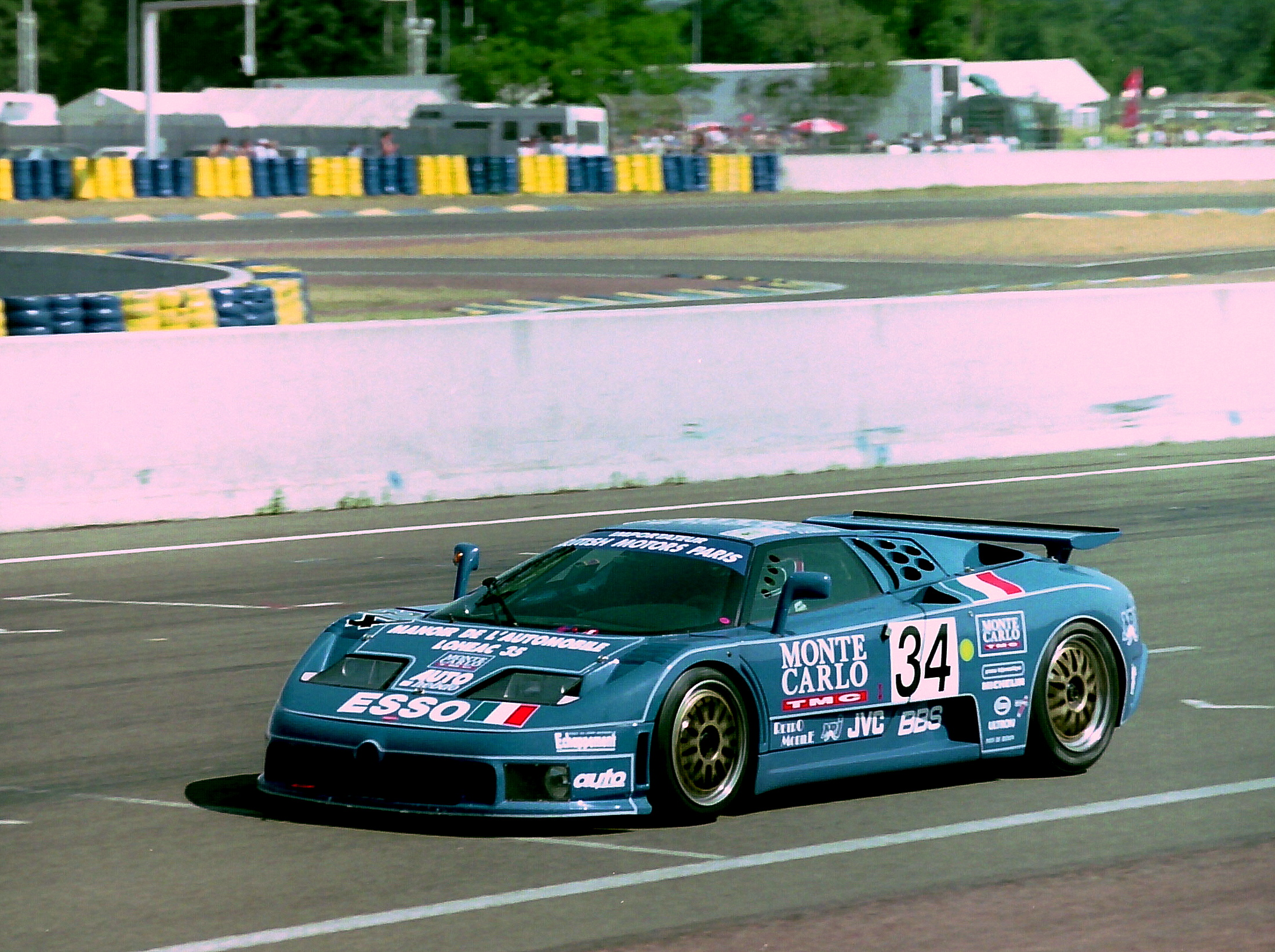
Bugatti EB 110 LM on track at the 1994 24 Hours of Le Mans

=== Brabus EB 110 ===
The Brabus EB 110 is a modified version of the EB 110 Super Sports by German automotive tuning company Brabus. The car has not received any exterior modifications by the company with most of the modifications done to the interior and engine. The car has a bi colour blue and black leather interior and a custom made quad pipe exhaust system. Engine modifications of the car along with its performance statistics remain unknown. This is the only EB 110 modified by the company. The car's existence became known only after it was put on sale in 2013.

== Motorsport ==
The EB 110 LM participated in the 24 Hours of Le Mans in 1994. The car qualified a very competitive 17th overall and 5th in the GT1 class but did not finish the race. The car is now on display at the Lohéac Automobile Museum. A second car commissioned by wealthy pharmaceutical entrepreneur Martino Finotto also participated in the 1996 24 Hours of Daytona, but suffered a gearbox problem and did not finish.

== See also ==
- Timeline of most powerful production cars
