= B Engineering =

Small-volume automobile manufacturer

B Engineering is a small-volume automobile manufacturer located in Italy. It is made up of several former employees of the Bugatti firm when it was under the leadership of Romano Artioli.

== Edonis ==
B Engineering is the company behind the super-exclusive Edonis supercar, based on the Bugatti EB110. Thanks to several engine modifications, it has higher performance than the vehicle on which it is based.

The first model, presented in 2001, was called Edonis, based on the Bugatti EB110 Super Sport, but had been extensively revised: the only element, which kept from the original Bugatti, was the carbon fiber frame. Both the exterior and the interior of the car had been completely renewed. Bugatti's 3.5-liter engine was increased to 3760 cm^{3} of displacement. The original IHI turbochargers had been replaced by two larger units from the same manufacturer; Thanks to this, the engine power had increased from 610 CV DIN (448 kW) and 650 Nm of torque to 680 CV DIN (500 kW) at 8000 rpm and 735 N.

A production of 21 units was initially planned, all to be delivered by 2002 at a price of around €760000, but, after being advertised by the press and having participated in some motor shows, since 2004 the traces of the project have been lost.

== Bugatti Service ==
Because of the close relation of the Edonis to the Bugatti EB110 and EB112, B Engineering provides service and parts for these models.

== Padane Bus ==
After the closure of Padane (a bus manufacturer), B Engineering acquired the spare parts warehouse and archive materials. Currently, B Engineering uses these facilities to provide service, spare parts and general advice to Padane bus owners.
