= B Engineering Edonis =

Italian sports car based on the Bugatti EB 110

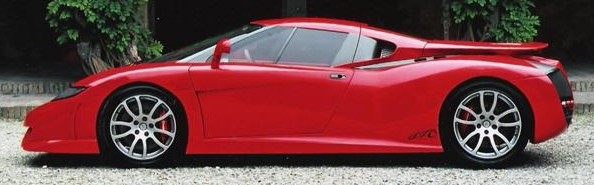

Overview
- Manufacturer: B Engineering
- Production: 2000-2003 and 2018 (3 units)
- Designer: Nicola Materazzi (Chief Engineer), Marc Deschamps (Styling)

Body and chassis
- Class: Sports car (S)
- Body style: 2-door coupé
- Layout: Rear mid-engine, rear-wheel-drive
- Related: Bugatti EB 110

Powertrain
- Engine: 3.8-litre Bugatti B.110.11 twin-turbo V12
- Power output: 500 kW (680 PS; 671 hp)
- Transmission: 6-speed manual

Dimensions
- Wheelbase: 2,565 mm (101.0 in)
- Length: 4,350 mm (171.3 in)
- Width: 1,998 mm (78.7 in)
- Height: 1,120 mm (44.1 in)
- Curb weight: 1,300 kg (2,866 lb)

The B Engineering Edonis is a sports car developed in the year 2000 and manufactured by Italian automobile manufacturer B Engineering with overall engineering by Nicola Materazzi (ex Lancia, Ferrari, & Bugatti) and styling by Marc Deschamps (ex Gruppo Bertone).

Not many details of the intermediate design stages by Materazzi and Deschamps are documented but some of the sketches are documented in the promotional videos by B.Engineering. Until 2012 the 1:1 scale buck model (with some damage) of the Edonis was for some time stored at Heuliez and then listed for auction. It shows how the body shape was made before body panels were formed for the prototypes.

The Edonis is based on the Bugatti EB110 Super Sport, sharing its carbon-fibre chassis, but having a redesigned interior and exterior. The engine also originates from the EB110 and is enlarged from 3.5 to 3.76 litres in displacement.

Two prototypes were originally produced, one painted in metallic gold colour which was presented in Modena and at other shows, and one in "Rosso Pompeiano".

Although the design is not new, the model is still in production in very low volume for customers who contact B.Engineering directly and order a car to their individual taste.

== Background ==
After Bugatti Automobili S.p.A. went bankrupt in 1995, a handful of ex-employees of the company formed a new company called B Engineering under the financing of Jean-Marc Borel, former Bugatti vice-Chairman and author of several Lamborghini books.

Key employees included Federico Trombi (formerly responsible for homologation) and Gianni Sighinolfi (formerly head of development workshops).

The meaning of the letter "B" is not particularly well documented: it can be a moniker for both Bugatti and Borel. The company workshops remained in the same building (Via Resistenza 12, Campogalliano) that had originally been used for development in 1988-89 while the main Bugatti factory was being designed and constructed by Benedini & Partners.

During the auctioning of Bugatti assets, B.Engineering purchased and thus retained in Campogalliano some of the left over stock of parts used in the production of the EB110 sports car including engines and 17 unfinished monocoques as a portion was already retained by Dauer Sportwagen GmBH and other companies such as Monaco Racing Team (of Gildo Pastor Pallanca).

Aside from manufacturing the Edonis, B Engineering also services the original EB110 sports cars and prepares other classic cars of historic relevance.

== Development History ==
The new company started to develop a new sports car under its name using the chassis of the EB110 as a base. Nicola Materazzi gave guidelines to designer Deschamps to dress the car in a body with aerodynamic efficiency in mind in order to achieve a target top speed of 100 m/s, or 360 km/h.

Thanks to good relationships between Materazzi and Scaglietti (from the days of Ferrari), the latter recommended local artisans who could make the bodywork for the first two prototypes the bodywork in aluminium, a technique that Modenese artisans have practiced for decades and which is useful for low volume production to reduce early tooling costs. The interior was also new compared to that of the EB110 with an updated dashboard and seats, upholstered in leather.

Coming from a strong background in racing, during the development of the EB110, Materazzi was never convinced of the effectiveness of the four turbochargers and the four wheel drive system, often stating that it was a way to "render difficult what is easy by adopting the un-necessary". In his interviews Materazzi discusses that the body of the car was completed very quickly in 47 days, just in time for the presentation on New Year's Day of 2001. However the EB110's technical specification had already been established by 1990 and was not going to change in the mind of the President of Bugatti Automobili. For the Edonis the displacement of the engine was increased marginally from 3.5 to 3.76-litres and finally Materazzi was able to replace the four small IHI turbochargers with two larger IHI units: a reduction in marketing image but an increase in efficiency due to fluid mechanics laws that intrinsically link compressor and turbine wheel inertia and flow efficiency (a compromise between the two). The modified engine generates a power output of 500 kW (680 PS; 671 hp) at 8,000 rpm and 735 N⋅m (542 lb⋅ft) of torque at 3,200 rpm. The four-wheel-drive system used in the original EB110 was replaced in favour of a rear-wheel-drive system reducing the weight by 70 kg (154 lb). The EB110 gearbox which is integrated with the engine was retained.

== Design ==
The Edonis deviates from the angular design language of its donor car and instead has a curvaceous themed design. The fender-mounted headlights have ducts above them. An asymmetrical cooling duct between the headlights aids further in cooling of the brakes. The car has a wide rear end having large openings to cool the engine and has integrated tail lights in the two side-mounted rear grilles. A small fixed rear wing helps generate downforce.

== Production ==
B Engineering planned to build 21 cars from the leftover EB110 chassis, originally built by Aérospatiale, with an expected price of around €760,000.

On January 24, 2018, it was announced that the Edonis project had been taken over by Las Vegas-based automotive company Casil motors, previously known as PSC Motors. The project will be completed in collaboration with B Engineering, with the promise of 15 examples being produced and sold to the public using original Bugatti EB110 chassis. The car, now renamed the Edonis SP-110 will use most of the upgrades that the original Edonis received in 2001, with the exception of a newly designed body kit offered by Casil Motors called the "Rinascita Aero Package".

== Performance ==
The Edonis has a power-to-weight ratio of 480 hp/ton and an engine specific power output of 181 hp/litre. The car has a claimed top speed of 365 km/h (227 mph) and can accelerate to 100 km/h from a standstill in 3.9 seconds. In the summer of 2002 French magazine Sport-Auto organised a comparison amongst supercars at the Nardo' circuit in Puglia, southern Italy. The winner was the 715 horsepower Edonis, fitted with Michelin Pax System tyres, which clocked up a record speed for the circuit of 359.6 km/h. The Pax tyre sizes were (front): 245-650 ZR 480 A and (rear): 355-670 ZR 500 A.
