= Bugatti V12 engine =

Bugatti V-12 engines
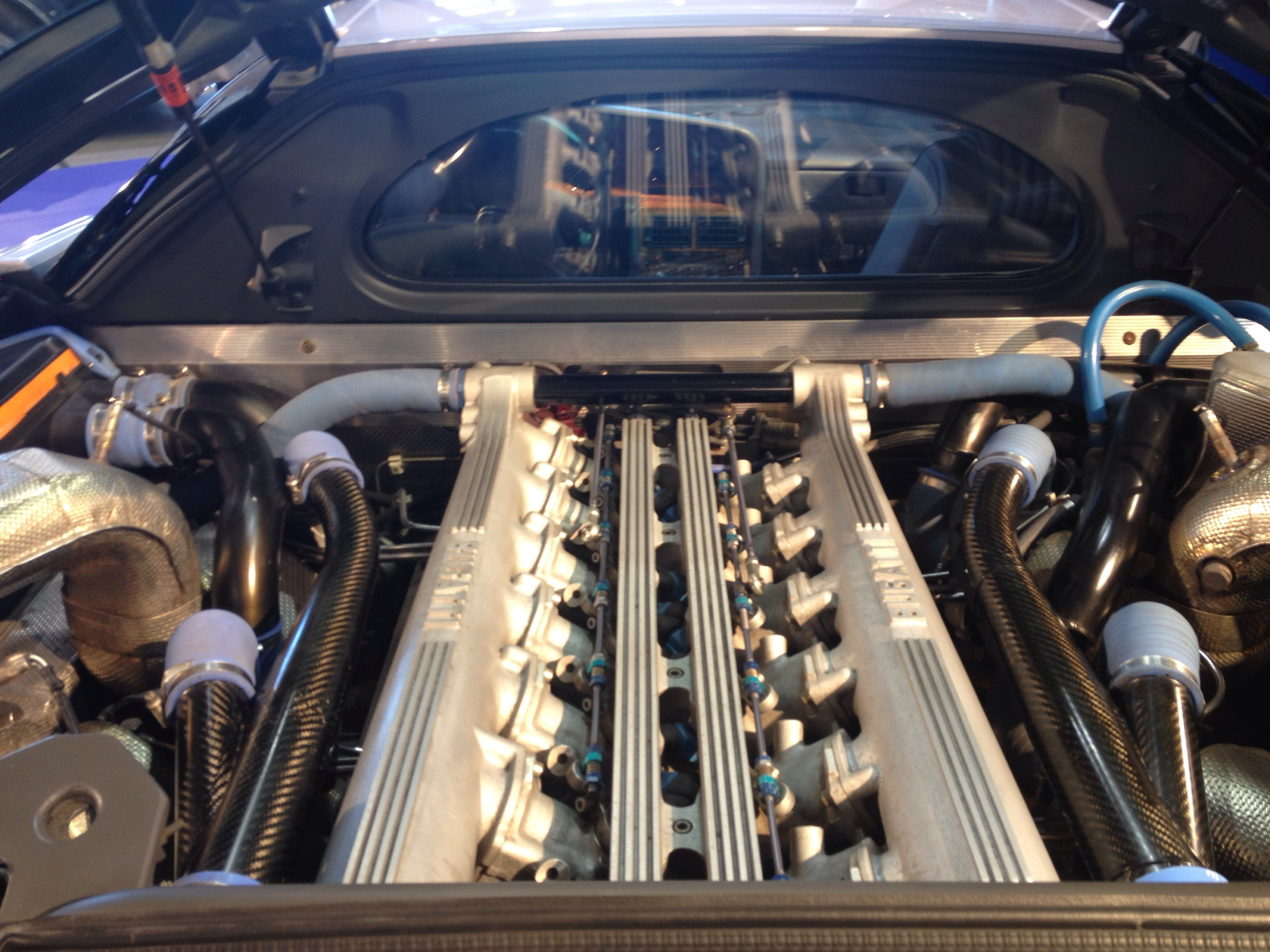

Overview
- Manufacturer: Bugatti
- Production: 1991-1995, 1998 (original engine); 2001-present (B Engineering Edonis tuned engine version)

Layout
- Configuration: V-12
- Displacement: 3.5–6.0 L (214–366 cu in)
- Cylinder bore: 81–86 mm (3.19–3.39 in)
- Piston stroke: 56.6–86 mm (2.23–3.39 in)
- Valvetrain: 60-valve, DOHC, five-valves per cylinder

Combustion
- Turbocharger: Quad-turbocharged (EB 110); Naturally aspirated (EB 112)
- Fuel system: Electronic fuel injection
- Oil system: Dry sump

Output
- Power output: 450–720 hp (336–537 kW)
- Torque output: 451–542 lb⋅ft (611–735 N⋅m)

Chronology
- Successor: Bugatti W16 engine

Bugatti made two V-12 internal combustion piston engines. The first was a quad-turbocharged, 3.5-liter engine, used in their EB 110 sports car, in 1991. The second was a 6.0-liter, naturally-aspirated unit, used in their full-size EB 112 luxury fastback sedan.

== Overview ==
=== EB 110 ===
The engine is a 60-valve, quad-turbocharged, V12 engine; fed through 12 individual throttle bodies. The 3,500 cc (3.5 L; 213.6 cu in) engine has a bore x stroke of 81 mm × 56.6 mm (3.19 in × 2.23 in). The EB110 GT had a power output of 412 kW (560 PS; 553 hp) at 8,000 rpm and 611 N⋅m (451 lb⋅ft) of torque at 3,750 rpm. The performance oriented Super Sport version had the engine tuned to a maximum power output of 450 kW (612 PS; 603 hp) at 8,250 rpm and 650 N⋅m (479 lb⋅ft) of torque at 4,200 rpm.

=== B Engineering Edonis ===
The tuned 3.5-liter Bugatti engine used in the B Engineering Edonis has had its displacement increased from 3,500 cc to 3,760 cc. The original four small IHI turbochargers have been replaced by two larger units from the same manufacturer. Engine power has been increased from 450 kW (603 hp) and 650 N⋅m (479 lb⋅ft) of torque to 507 kW (689 PS; 680 hp) at 8,000 rpm and 735 N⋅m (542 lb⋅ft) of torque. A version with 720 bhp set a speed of 359.6 km/h (223.4 mph) at the Nardo' proving ground in Italy.

=== EB 112 ===
Power comes from a Volkswagen-designed, naturally-aspirated V12 engine, generating a power output of 456 PS (335 kW; 450 hp) and 479 lb⋅ft (649 N⋅m) of torque. The engine featured 5 valves per cylinder, and has a displacement of 6.0-litres opposed to the EB110's 3.5-litres. The engine is placed behind the front wheels, more towards the center of the car inside of the wheelbase to have a much better weight distribution. The EB 112 features permanent all-wheel drive. The car can accelerate from 0–100 km/h (0–62 mph) in 4.3 seconds and has a claimed top speed of 300 km/h (186 mph).

== Applications ==
- Bugatti EB 110
- Bugatti EB 112 (concept)
- B Engineering Edonis
