= Palazzo Lancia =

High-rise building in Turin, Italy

- View of Palazzo Lancia from the road of the same name, which passes underneath it

- Location within Italy
- Alternative names: Grattacielo Lancia

General information
- Location: Via Vincenzo Lancia, 26, Turin, Italy
- Coordinates: 45°03′40.1″N 7°38′28.8″E
- Named for: Vincenzo Lancia, Lancia & C.
- Construction started: March 1954
- Completed: March 1956

Height
- Roof: 62 m (203 ft)
- Top floor: 52 m (171 ft)

Technical details
- Floor count: 17

Design and construction
- Architect: Nino Rosani with Giò Ponti
- Main contractor: SAICCA

Palazzo Lancia (Lancia Palace), also known as Grattacielo Lancia (Lancia Skyscraper), is a high-rise building located in the northern Italian city of Turin. It was originally commissioned by Gianni Lancia, president and son of the founder of Italian automobile manufacturer Lancia, to serve as main headquarters for the company.

== History ==
In the early 1950s Lancia produced cars, buses, trucks, motors, spare parts and panels for vans. The company had less employees and workers per head than Fiat, but needed to build central headquarters within which it could house offices and important meetings. In Turin, no such place existed amongst the small company-owned factories.

Gianni Lancia, president of the company, wished to bring management, accountancy and engineering offices under one roof. The project was laid down in 1953 by Lancia's own Servizio Costruzioni under Italian architect Nino Rosani, with consultancy from Giò Ponti.

The contract was given to SAICCA, and construction started in March 1954. Gianni Lancia never saw the building he wanted become operational, as control of the Lancia company was passed to cement industrialist Pesenti family in 1956, and the building was finally completed in March 1956.

=== Ownership ===
From 1957 the building served its intended function of Lancia's management and technical headquarter. In 1969, Fiat S.p.A. took over a heavily indebted Lancia from the Pesenti family, and with it the ownership of Palazzo Lancia. By the 1990s Fiat started to move offices away, progressively emptying the building.

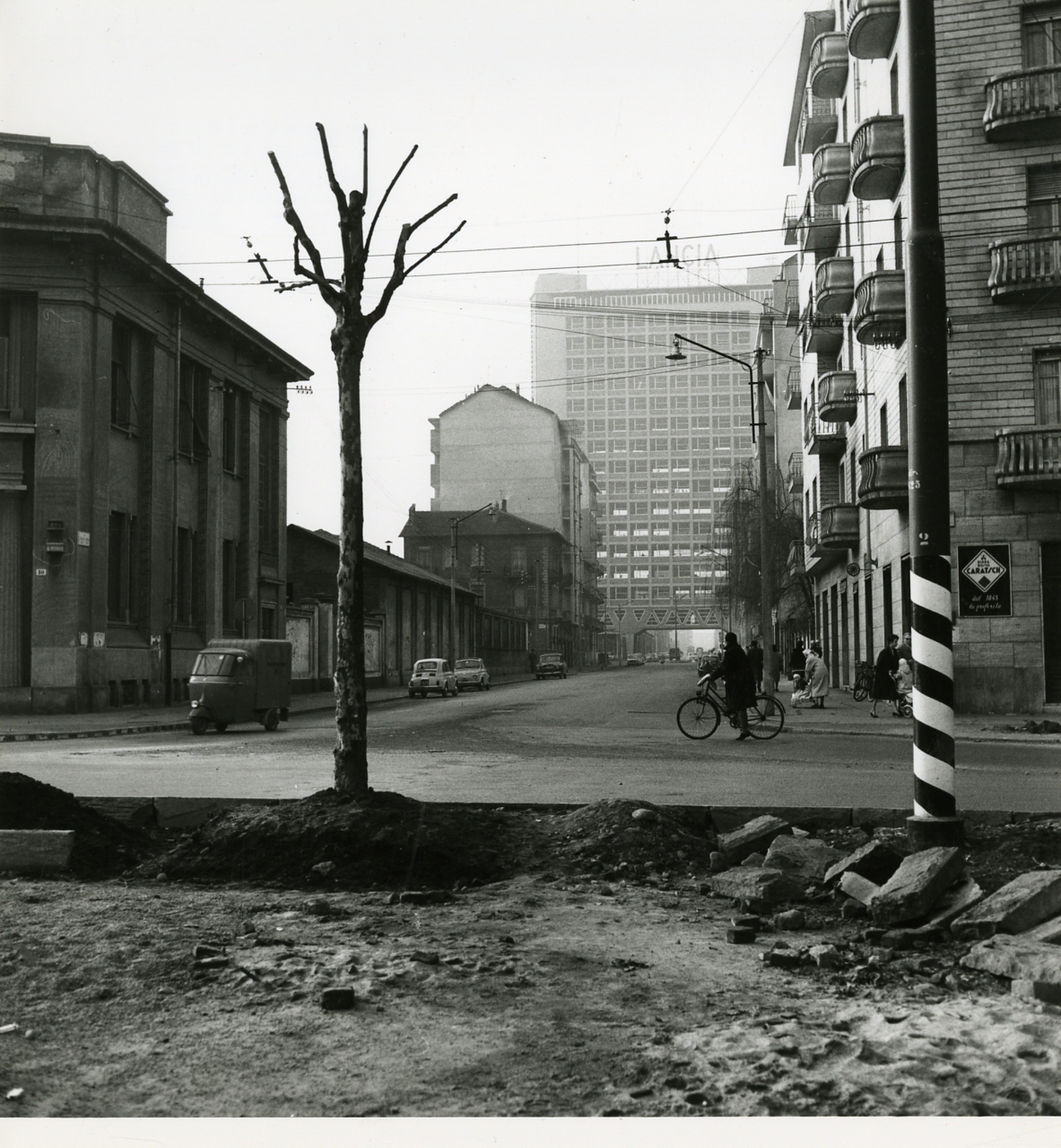
Partial view of the facade from Via Vincenzo Lancia, showing the now-removed Lancia sign. Photo by Paolo Monti.

In March 2005, Fiat S.p.A. sold the unoccupied Grattacielo to Torino 05, a joint venture between real estate firms Beni Stabili and Gefim (42.5% each) and Fiat Partecipazioni (15%). In 2008 another real estate developer, Patio Immobiliare, purchased in turn the building for a reported 15 million Euros, planning to transform it into luxury flats. After having carried out some renewal work the company filed for bankruptcy in 2013; Palazzo Lancia is currently awaiting to be auctioned to pay off its owner's debts.

== Description ==

Palazzo Lancia is built like a bridge over Via Vincenzo Lancia, (Note: Formerly Via Montenegro. This street was renamed twice: first Via Braccini after World War Two, and then Via Vincenzo Lancia in 1946.) which passes underneath it. In such a position it joined the northern and southern halves of Lancia's Borgo San Paolo plant, which was crossed by the pre-existing road as it had been built and acquired in various stages between the 1910s and the 1940s as Lancia's operations grew. Most of the building consists of office space, with an added meeting room for the top board of the manufacturer's executives.

== Sources ==
- Amatori, Franco; et al. (1992). Storia della Lancia — Impresa Tecnologie Mercati 1906–1969. Milan: Fabbri Editori.
