= Ferrari 288 GTO =

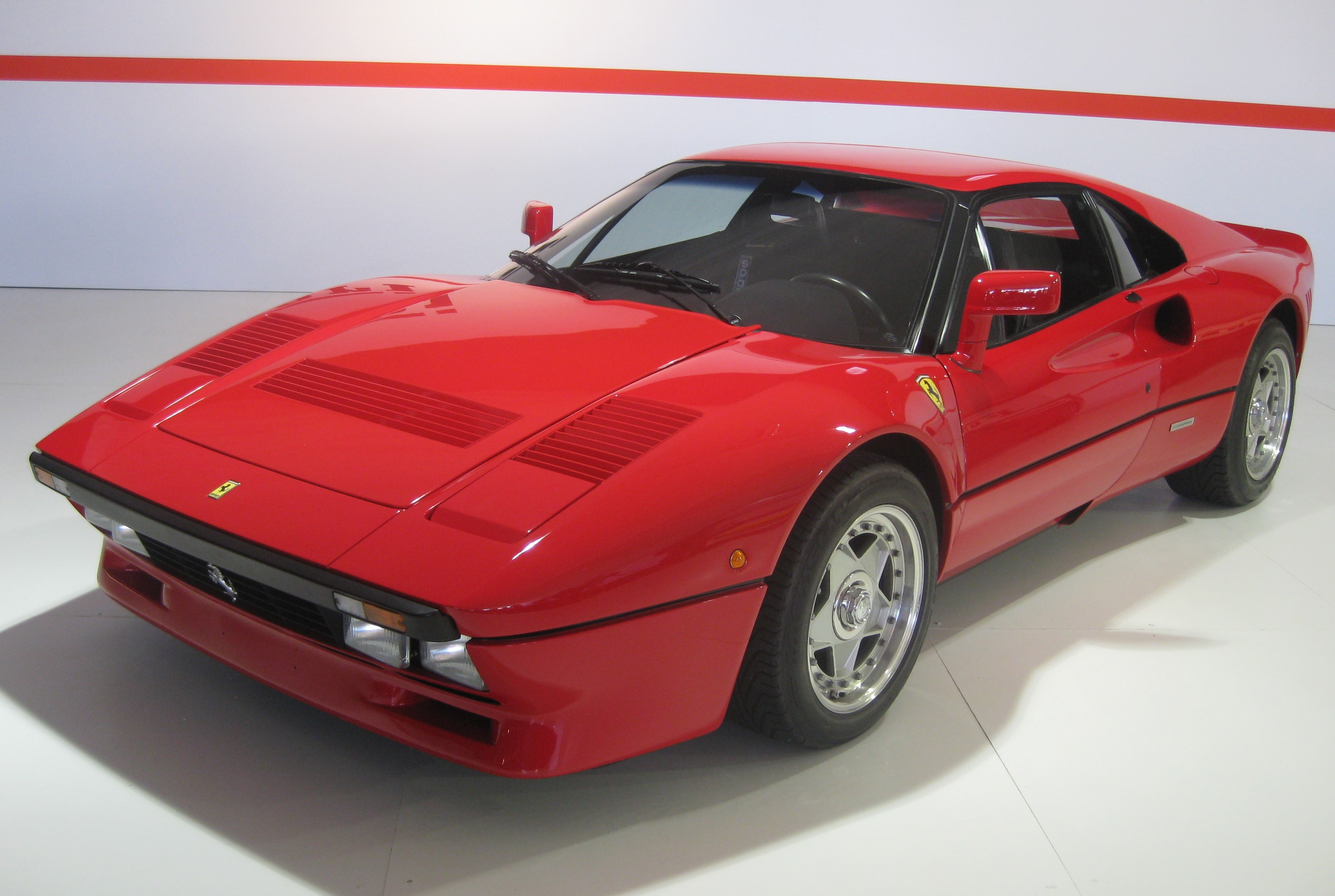

Overview
- Manufacturer: Ferrari
- Also called: Ferrari GTO
- Production: 1984–1987; 272 produced
- Assembly: Italy: Maranello
- Designer: Leonardo Fioravanti at Pininfarina; Nicola Materazzi (Chief Engineer)

Body and chassis
- Class: Sports car (S)
- Body style: 2-door berlinetta
- Layout: Rear mid-engine, rear-wheel-drive
- Related: Ferrari 308 GTB/GTS

Powertrain
- Engine: 2.9 L (2,855 cc) F114 B 000 twin turbo V8
- Power output: 400 PS (294 kW; 395 bhp) and 496 N⋅m (366 lbf⋅ft) of torque
- Transmission: 5-speed manual

Dimensions
- Wheelbase: 2,450 mm (96.5 in)
- Length: 4,290 mm (168.9 in)
- Width: 1,910 mm (75.2 in)
- Height: 1,120 mm (44.1 in)
- Kerb weight: 1,160 kg (2,557.4 lb) (Dry)

Chronology
- Predecessor: Ferrari 250 GTO
- Successor: Ferrari F40

The Ferrari GTO (often referred to as Ferrari 288 GTO) (Type F114) is an exotic homologation version of the Ferrari 308 GTB produced from 1984 until 1987 in Ferrari's Maranello factory. The name "GTO" is an acronym, with GT meaning Gran Turismo, and O meaning Omologata (homologated in Italian).

== Background ==
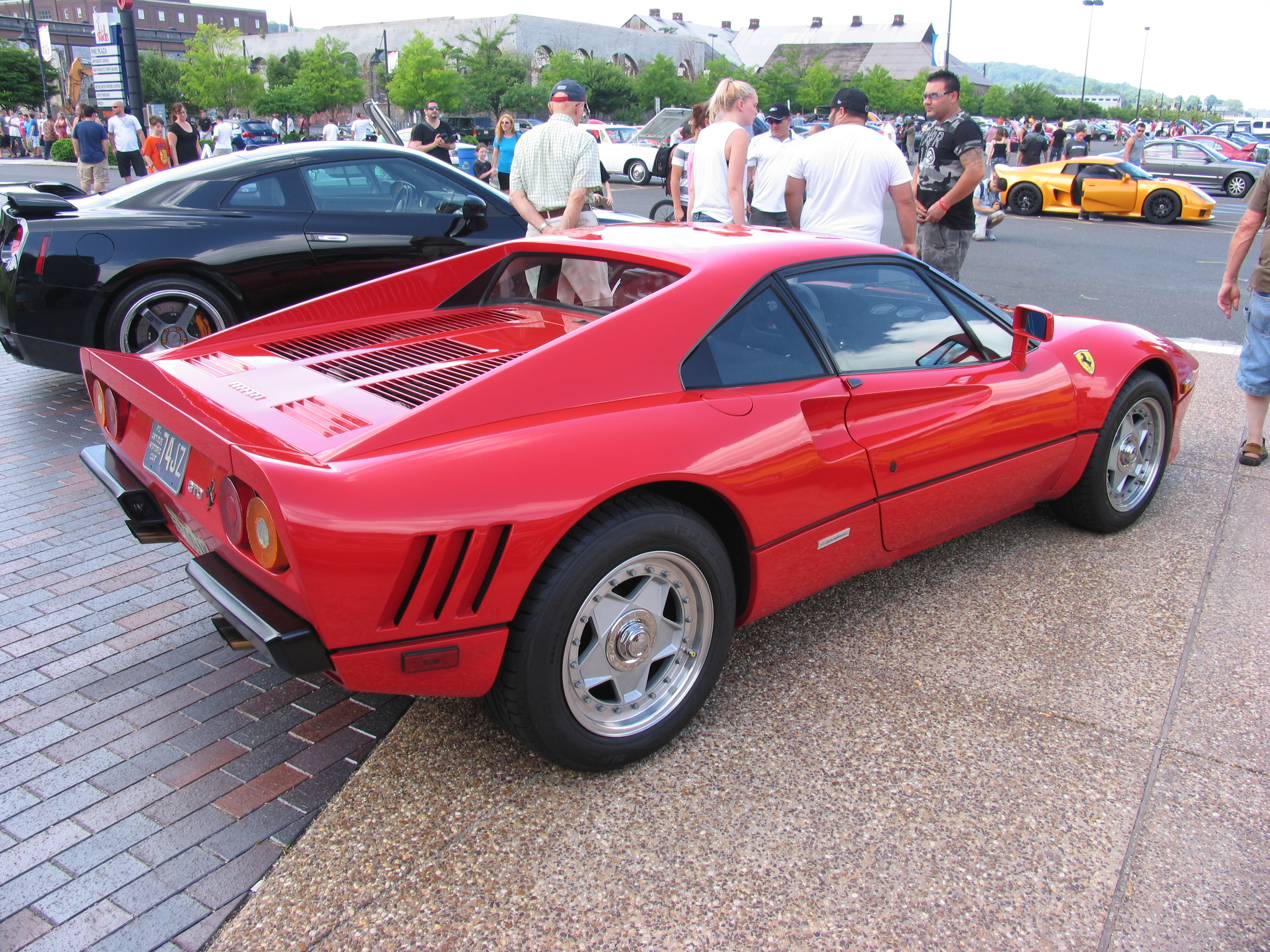
Ferrari 288 GTO rear 3/4 view

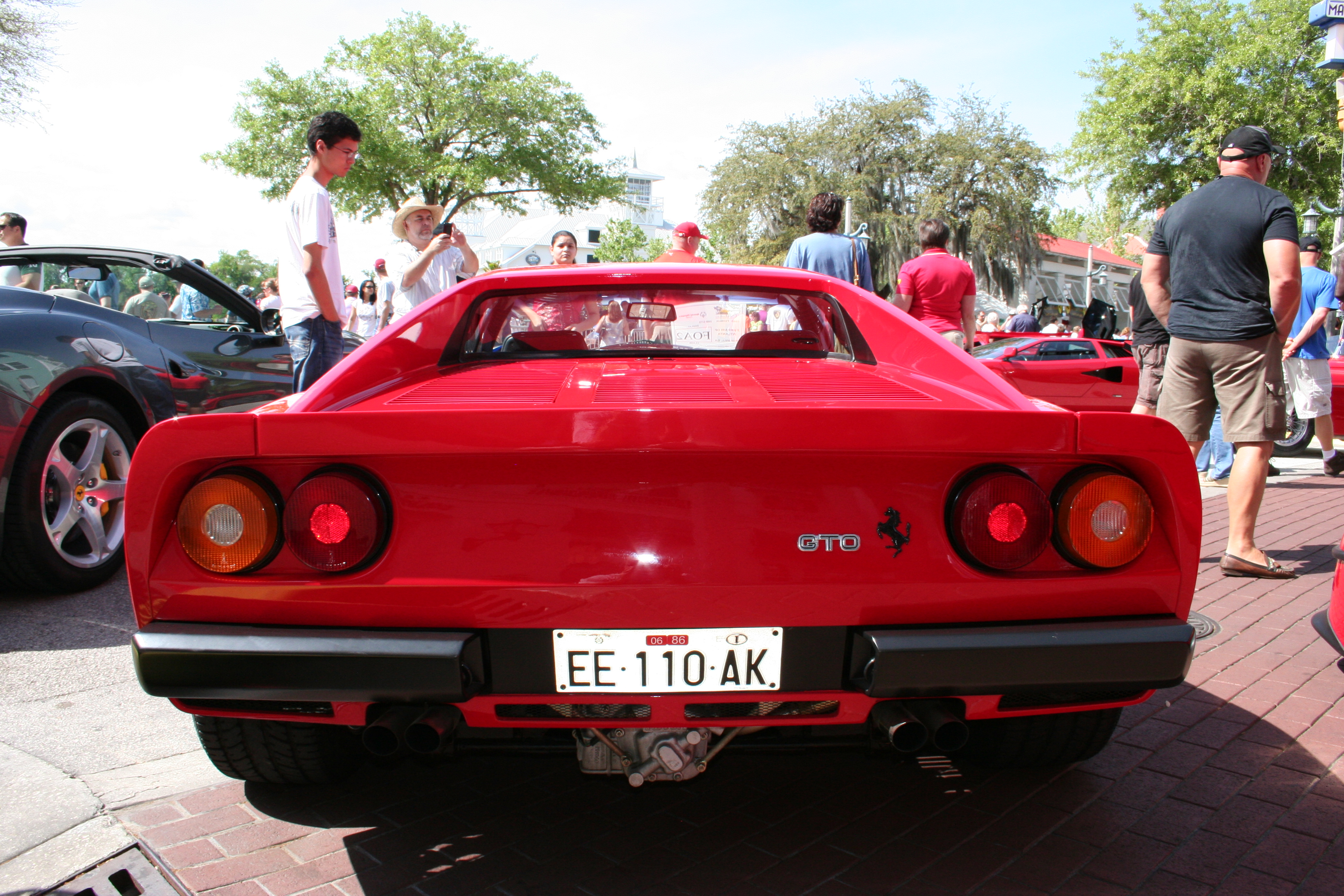
Rear view of a Ferrari 288 GTO

Contrary to what is reported historically in the press, the Ferrari GTO was not immediately born to compete in the new 1982 Group B Circuit Race series; Enzo Ferrari did not have overall control of the Road Car division, which was at the time managed by the General Director Eugenio Alzati, and the FIAT MD (CEO) Vittorio Ghidella. In 1983, Enzo Ferrari noted from discussions with close friends and clients that road car sales were falling due to stronger competition from rival car makers and what he described as the "excessive gentrification" of the Ferrari model lineup.

== Turbocharging: from F1 to road cars ==
The success of turbocharging in Formula 1 and the introduction of some new tax laws (above the 1999cc displacement threshold) had prompted Ferrari to first build the 208 Turbo and then discuss turbocharging also in 3 litre form for a road car which could produce 330 bhp. The first 208 turbo did not feature an intercooler so the performance and reliability was somewhat delicate due to high combustion temperatures. Ferrari approached the head of powertrain for the Gestione Sportiva (Racing Division), Nicola Materazzi, to give an opinion on the proposed specification for the new 3L turbo engine. Materazzi had joined from Osella in 1979 (before then at Lancia Reparto Corse) due to his experience with forced induction and had been involved in the 126 F1 car experimentation between Comprex and turbo. When Materazzi showed confidence that 400 bhp could be reliably extracted from 3000cc (133 bhp/litre), Ferrari placed his trust in him on condition that it would deliver as promised. Ferrari also jokingly suggested that Materazzi work on the 268 engine destined for the Lancia LC2 Group C racing car, due to similarities in displacement and mechanical parts.

== Development ==
The Ferrari F114B road-car engine and the Lancia 2.6L V8 race engine developments progressed closely, with some draughtsmen employed from Abarth to complete detail design on components for manufacture at times when the Ferrari draughtsmen were at full capacity. In order to improve overall performance, several key aspects of the original 308 vehicle layout were altered: the engine did not grow in displacement but was turbocharged, it remained mid-mounted but now longitudinally instead of transversely, the wheelbase was elongated by 200 mm, the outer bodywork required modifications to maintain pleasing proportions. The car used water-cooled IHI turbochargers from Japan compared to the KK&K turbochargers used in Formula 1 due to the better materials and aerodynamic internal designs which allowed faster transient response. IHI had bought patents from Swiss manufacturer Brown Boveri (Baden) that had supplied Ferrari with the Comprex systems.

Some of the GTO's styling features were first displayed on a 308 GTB design exercise by Pininfarina shown at the 1977 Geneva Auto Salon. The 288 GTO had started out as a modified version of the 308/328 to hold down costs and to build the car quickly, but little of the 308/328 was left when the 288 GTO was finished. Fortunately Ferrari could count on customers who were loyal when it came to spending more if they could access performance and style that was unmatched, so the unplanned deviation from the original cost targets did not necessarily prove an issue.

Easily noticeable differences were the GTOs bulging fender flares, larger front/rear spoilers, large "flag-style" outside mirrors and four driving lights at the far sides of the grille. Retained from the original 250 GTO were slanted air vents, put in the GTO's rear fenders to cool the brakes, as well as the rear wing's design, borrowed from the 250 GTO's original wing. The GTO also had wider body panels than the 308's because they had to cover much larger Goodyear tires mounted on racing wheels. The suspension's height could be set higher for road use and lower for racing on tracks. Bodywork material was new and lighter for better acceleration and handling. The GTO's weight was 2,555 lb (1,159 kg), compared to 3,085–3,350 lb (1,399–1,520 kg) for the 308/328. Steel was used just for the doors because major body panels were made from molded fiberglass. Kevlar was used for the hood, and the roof was made from Kevlar and carbon fiber.

All GTO road cars and GTO Evoluziones were left-hand drive and painted the most common Ferrari factory color - "Rosso Corsa" (aka "Racing Red"). In 1990, one chassis was sent to Pininfarina for conversion to right-hand drive and a color change to "Dark Slate" with a red stripe before reaching its owners, the Brunei Royal Family.

Materazzi felt that with the latest road speed limits and stricter fines, it was increasingly harder for clients to really prove the potential of cars with high performance. Ferrari asked what was his proposal, to which he suggested returning to racing in the GT class, something which had been interrupted after the 512 BB LM. The overall permission to modify the GTO road car into the Evoluzione for a racing programme however had to be ratified by Eugenio Alzati. He permitted it on conditions that the engineers interested in the project work outside of the Monday to Friday timetable (which was dedicated for development of 328 and other models). The lessons learnt during the development of the engine for the Lancia LC2 could be applied to the racing version of the GTO, such as the carefully engineered conicity of the intake plenums to ensure accurately balanced air flow and pressure to each cylinder and the setup of the turbochargers to produce in excess of 650 bhp.

The GTO Evoluzione included all the necessary modifications (bodywork, chassis, safety systems) to comply with the FIA regulations which permitted 20 cars per year to be specifically built for rally or track racing. Due to multiple deaths and the inherent danger involved with group B rally racing, the Group B Circuit series was suspended at the end of 1986. As a result, the GTO Evoluzione never raced.

Like any Ferrari car, the low production numbers for the GTO were intended to give an exclusive product for the enthusiast buyer. The number of GTOs produced did indeed fit in the minimum requirement of 200 required by the FIA and in fact the factory produced 70 more plus a couple extra to please the Agnelli family, an F1 driver or anybody else who the Commendatore predicted might insist on a last minute purchase option.

Although the production car test team, headed by Dario Benuzzi, did not include any of the Formula 1 drivers, Michele Alboreto occasionally had involvement in giving feedback on cars such as the 288 GTO, and later the 328 Turbo and F40. In particular he agreed with Enzo Ferrari's return to a breed of cars which were much more fiery, describing the GTO as "cattiva" (angry) and praising its low engine centre of gravity compared to the Testarossa.

== Engine ==
The GTO was based on the rear mid-engine, rear wheel drive 308 GTB, which has a 2.9 L (2,927 cc) V8. The "288" refers to the GTO's 2.8 litre DOHC 4 valves per cylinder V8 engine as it used a de-bored by 1 mm (0.04 in) with IHI twin-turbochargers, Behr air-to-air intercoolers, Weber-Marelli fuel injection and a compression ratio of 7.6:1. The 2.85 litre engine capacity was dictated by the FIA's requirement for a turbocharged engine's capacity to be multiplied by 1.4. This gave the GTO an equivalent engine capacity of 3,997 cc (4.0 L; 243.9 cu in), just under the Group B limit of 4.0 litres.

Unlike the 308's 2,927 cc (2.9 L; 178.6 cu in) engine, the GTO's 2,855 cc (2.9 L; 174.2 cu in) V8 was mounted longitudinally, using the 308's rear trunk space. This was necessary to make room for the twin turbochargers and intercoolers. The racing transmission was mounted to the rear of the longitudinal engine, moving the rear differential and wheels aft. The arrangement also let the GTO use a more conventional race-car engine/transmission layout for such things as quick gear-ratio changes for various tracks. As a result, the wheelbase was 110 mm (4.3 in) longer at 2,450 mm (96.5 in). The track was also widened to accommodate wider wheels and tires (Goodyear NCT 225/55 VR16 tires mounted on 8 x 16 inch Speedline wheels at the front and 255/50 VR16 (265/50 VR16 for U.S. models) mounted on 10 x 16 inch wheels at the rear) to provide increased cornering and braking performance and the ability to apply 400 PS (395 bhp; 294 kW) at 7,000 rpm and 496 N⋅m (366 lb⋅ft) of torque at 3,800 rpm. The GTO could accelerate from 0-60 mph (97 km/h) in around 5 seconds and Ferrari claimed 0-125 mph (201 km/h) in 15 seconds flat and a top speed of 189 mph (304 km/h), making it one of the fastest street-legal production cars of its time.

== 288 GTO in North America ==
Due to the higher cost of engineering and certifying for the US market in a very low volume, Ferrari did not offer the 288 GTO for sale in America. Several grey import specialists imported the European version and modified 288 GTO individually to meet the US specifications.

== Performance ==
Test results by Road & Track:

- 0–30 mph (48 km/h): 2.3 s
- 0–50 mph (80 km/h): 4.1 s
- 0–60 mph (97 km/h): 5.0 s
- 0–70 mph (113 km/h): 6.2 s
- 0–80 mph (129 km/h): 7.7 s
- 0–100 mph (161 km/h): 11.0 s
- 0–120 mph (193 km/h): 16.0 s
- Standing 1/4 mile (402 m): 14.1 s at 113 mph (182 km/h)
- Top speed: 179 mph (288 km/h)

== Evoluzione ==
Ferrari 288 GTO Evoluzione
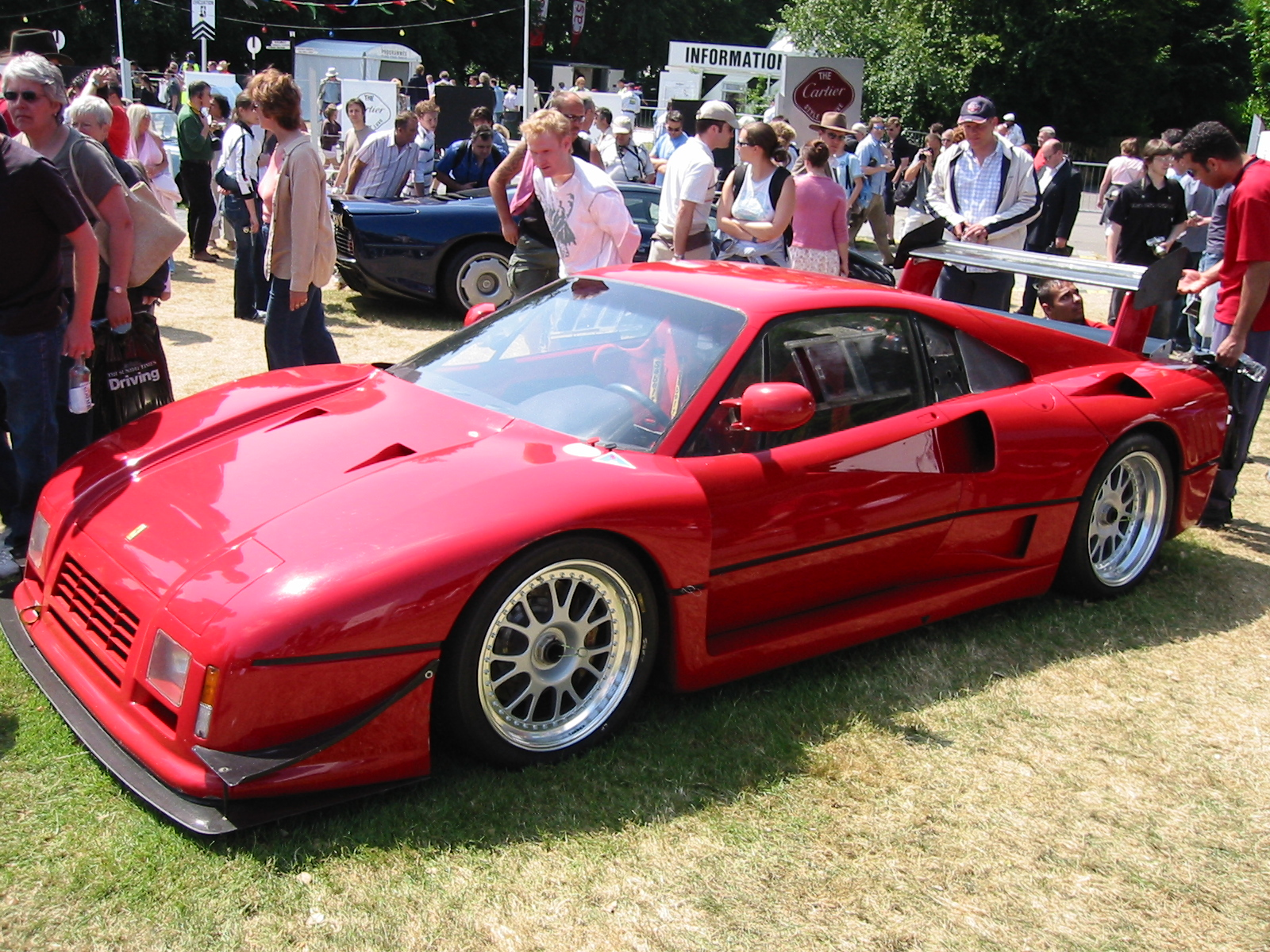
- Category: Group B
- Constructor: Michelotto
- Designer: Giuliano Michelotto
- Production: 6
- Predecessor: Ferrari 512 BB LM
- Successor: Ferrari F40 LM

Technical specifications
- Chassis: Steel tubular spaceframe, carbon-fiber/kevlar body
- Length: 4,225 mm (166.3 in)
- Width: 1,970 mm (77.6 in)
- Height: 1,100 mm (43.3 in)
- Wheelbase: 2,450 mm (96.5 in)
- Engine: Ferrari F114 B 000 2.9 L (2,855 cc) V8 twin turbo Rear mid-engine, rear-wheel-drive
- Torque: 479 lb⋅ft (649 N⋅m)
- Transmission: 5 manual
- Power: 650 hp (485 kW; 659 PS)
- Weight: 940 kg (2,072.3 lb)

Competition history

Ferrari built six (five production models and one prototype) 288 GTO Evoluzione models with more aggressive and aerodynamic body styling and increased power. The Evoluzione, introduced in 1986, was built to race in Group B but when that series was cancelled the project was also shelved as it was not fit for any other racing series. Ferrari had planned a production run of 20 cars to comply with Group B homologation requirements for Evolution models. The 288 GTO Evoluzione is powered by an upgraded version of the 2.9 L V8 used in the normal 288 GTO that has twin-turbochargers and produces 650 hp (485 kW; 659 PS) at 7,800 rpm. It has a weight of around 940 kg (2,072 lb) and could reportedly reach a top speed of 225 mph (362 km/h). It features a unique front end designed for aerodynamics with front canards, channels and vents as well as a large carbon fibre rear spoiler and numerous large NACA ducts. Many styling and mechanical elements from the Evoluzione influenced the soon to follow F40.

All six are thought to still be in existence, with one owned by the factory on display in the engine manufacturing facility in Maranello and another suspected to have been used as a prototype during the development of the F40.

== Notable owners ==
Several Formula 1 drivers were offered GTOs by Enzo Ferrari. These include Michele Alboreto (56195), Keke Rosberg (56653), and Niki Lauda (58329); the latter was gifted the last of the 272 units built, by Enzo Ferrari himself.

== Awards ==
In 2004, Sports Car International named this car number two on the list of Top Sports Cars of the 1980s, behind its German rival the Porsche 959.
