= Cagiva C589 =

Racing motorcycle

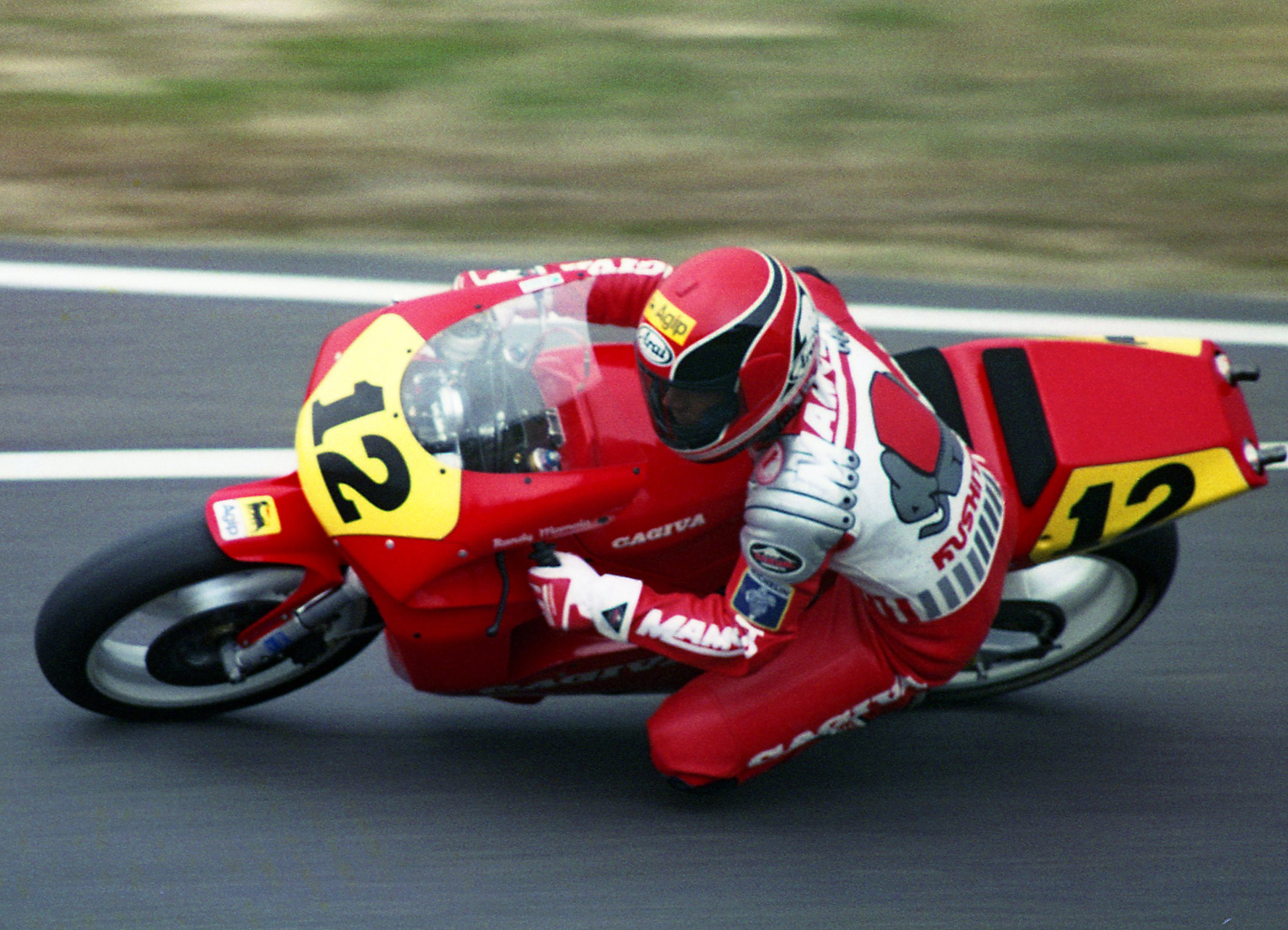
- Manufacturer: Cagiva
- Production: 1989
- Predecessor: Cagiva C588
- Successor: Cagiva C590
- Class: 500 cc
- Engine: 492.6 cc (30.06 cu in) two-stroke, four-cylinder with an 80° V angle
- Bore / stroke: 56 mm × 50 mm (2.2 in × 2.0 in)
- Power: 100 hp (75 kW) @ 12,000 rpm
- Torque: 83.3 N⋅m (61.4 lbf⋅ft) @ 11,500 rpm
- Transmission: Chain
- Wheelbase: 1400 mm
- Dimensions: L: 2015 mm W: 500 mm
- Seat height: 800 mm
- Weight: 122 kg (dry)
- Fuel capacity: 32 Liters

The Cagiva C589 was a racing motorcycle made by Cagiva, which was used in the 500cc class of Grand Prix motorcycle racing during the 1989 season. The name is formed by an amalgamation of words and letters, namely the "C", "5" and "89". The "C" stands for the company (Cagiva), the "5" stands for the class the company races in as well as the engine capacity (500) and the "89" stands for the season the bike raced in (1989). The bike replaced the C588 model used in 1988 and was replaced by the C590, used in 1990.

== Description ==
This bike is the direct evolution of previous year's bike and thus it barely differs in terms of parts and definitively adopted the new inverted forks (which were also used by Randy Mamola in the 1988 championship), as well as a banana swingarm and a 'one piece' bodywork which were designed by Massimo Tamburini. However, this design did not give an easy life to its riders as the bike was given the incorrect weight distribution which prevented it from freely unloading the power to the ground, the drivers frequently reporting that they found themselves in trouble because of it.

Aesthetically compared to the previous model, the C589 differs only for the long and thin additional slits at the end of the radiator vents and a slit behind and below the vents, while the Plexiglas on the front fairing is lower and less rounded.

== Season progress ==
Despite the new and futuristic designs on the bikes, Cagiva still continued to struggle throughout the year. The main reason for this was the lack of top-end speed the bike had compared to its competitors, incorrect weight distribution and poor power delivery. Randy Mamola scored a decent haul of points but also frequently failed to finish, scoring 4 DNFs during the season, and did not start three races as well. Wildcard rider Massimo Broccoli scored points twice and did not finish once, while the other replacement rider Raymond Roche failed to finish for his only outing for the team. The team scored a total of 41 points overall.

== Mass production ==
The C589 was the inspiration for the company to release a road-legal model with a similar design called the Cagiva Mito in 1990.

== Specifications ==
Cagiva C589 Specifications
Engine
Engine type:	Four-cylinder, 2-stroke with an 80° V-angle
Displacement:	492.6 cm^{3} (Bore 56.0 x Stroke 50.0 mm)
Ignition:	Magneti Marelli CDI
Fuel System:	
Fuel:	
Lubricants:	
Lubrication system:	
Data recording:	
Maximum power:	(At the shaft) 110.3 kW (150 HP) at 12.000 RPM
Maximum speed:	
Exhaust:	
Transmission
Type:	6-speed removable sequential (always in gear)
Primary drive:	Gear
Clutch:	Multi-disc in oil bath
Final drive:	Chain
Chassis and running gear
Frame type:	Aluminum beam
Front suspension:	Fully adjustable Öhlins upside down fork
Rear suspension:	Fully adjustable Öhlins shock absorber
Front/rear wheels:	Marchesini rims
Front/rear tyres:	Front: 3.50 (120/60) 17 / Rear: 6.00 (180/67) 18 Michelin tyres
Front brake:	Double 272.5 mm carbon disc with 4-piston AP caliper
Rear brake:	190 mm single disc with 2 piston AP caliper
Weight:	122 kg (dry)
Fuel capacity:	32 Liters
