= Romano Artioli =

Italian entrepreneur, one time owner of Bugatti and Lotus

Romano Artioli (born 5 December 1932, in Moglia) is an Italian entrepreneur and one-time owner of Bugatti and Lotus automobile brands.

Artioli was born in Moglia in the Province of Mantua. He was raised in Bolzano, where, in the 1980s, he operated one of the largest Ferrari dealerships in the world, selling in northern Italy and southern Germany. He also imported Japanese cars, owning Autoexpò which in 1982 became the first Italian importer of Suzuki.

He was encouraged by Ferruccio Lamborghini and Paolo Stanzani to establish Bugatti International, a holding company that bought the Bugatti trademark name in 1987, with Jan K. Breitfeld as President of the holding. Artioli became chairman of Bugatti Automobili S.p.A., which made the Bugatti EB 110 between 1991 and 1995. In 1993, his wife Renata Kettmeir formed the Bolzano-based Ettore Bugatti luxury item maker, also using the Bugatti "EB" logo. Their involvement ended in September 1995 due to bankruptcy, and the company was eventually bought by Volkswagen in April 1998. Prior to the sale to Volkswagen, private equity investor CVC attempted a purchase of Bugatti via UK corporate finance advisor Anglo American Ventures; however, the £100m deal failed at the due diligence stage.

Artioli purchased Lotus from General Motors in August 1993 and became its chairman until 1996, when he stepped down to be Special Projects director until 1998. He sold a majority stake to Proton in 1996 to fund his losses due to the insolvency of Bugatti.

His daughter Elena Artioli (born 1970) is a politician for the South Tyrolean People's Party and Lega Nord Alto Adige – Südtirol. The Lotus Elise was named after Romano Artioli's granddaughter Elisa Artioli.
