= List of Ferrari road cars =

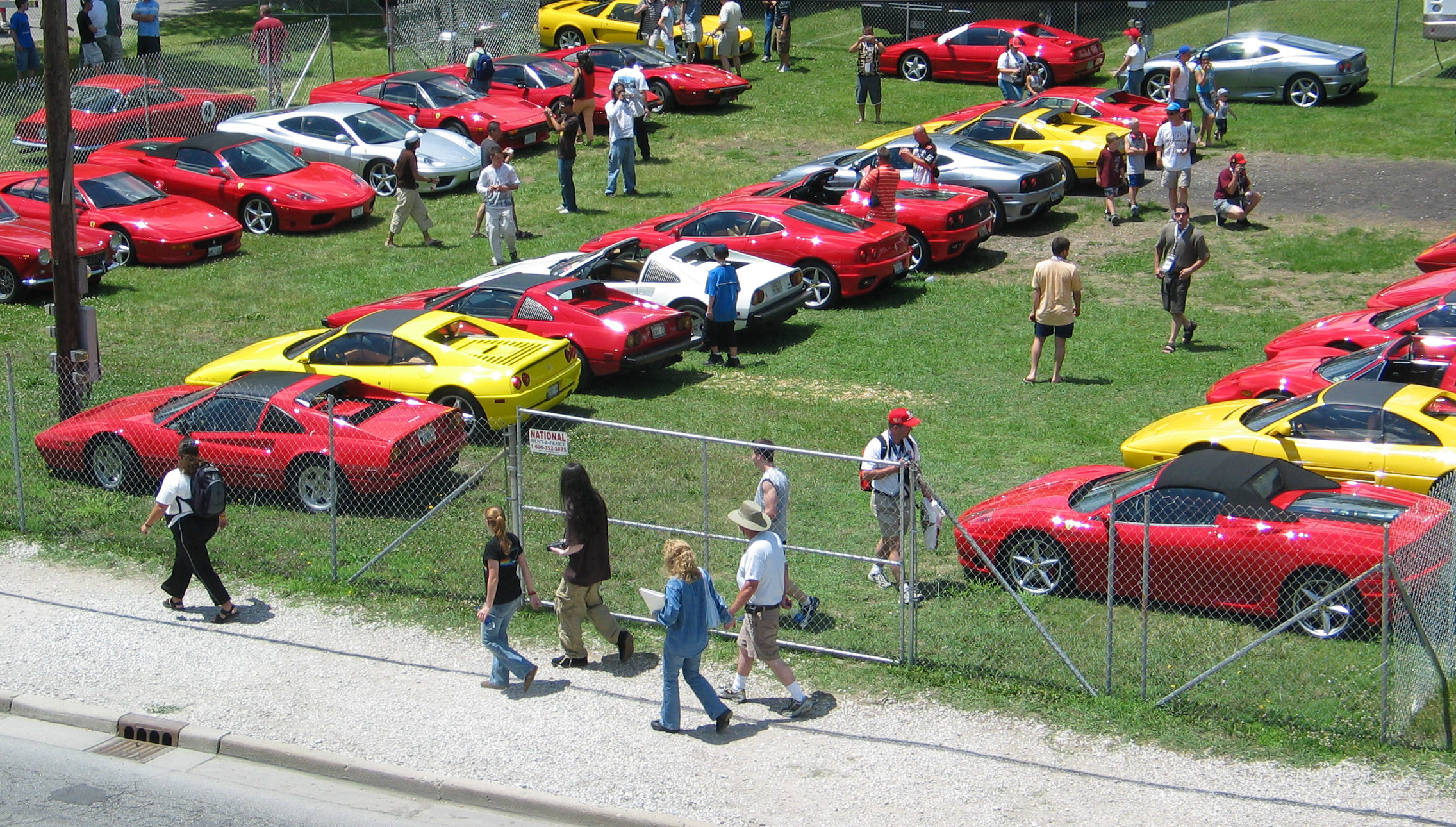
The Ferrari Club of America's parking lot at the 2005 United States Grand Prix

The following is a list of road cars manufactured by Italian sports car manufacturer Ferrari, dating back to the 1950s. (Race cars from the late 1940s.)

== Current models ==
Model	Calendar year introduced	Current model		Vehicle description
Model	Calendar year introduced	Introduction	Update/facelift	Vehicle description
296	2021	2021	–	Mid-engine, plug-in hybrid V6 sports car.
Purosangue	2022	2023	–	Ferrari's first production four-door; uses the same platform as the Roma. V12 crossover SUV.
12Cilindri	2024	2024	–	Front mid-engine, V12 grand tourer.
F80	2024	2024	–	Flagship hybrid V6 sports car, Successor to the LaFerrari.
Amalfi	2025	2025	–	Grand tourer V8 sports car, set to replace the Roma.
849 Testarossa	2025	2025	–	Mid-engine, plug-in hybrid V8 sports car, set to replace the SF90 Stradale.
Luce	2026	2026	–	Ferrari's first battery electric mid-size liftback sedan.

== Models by category ==
=== 2-seat grand tourer ===
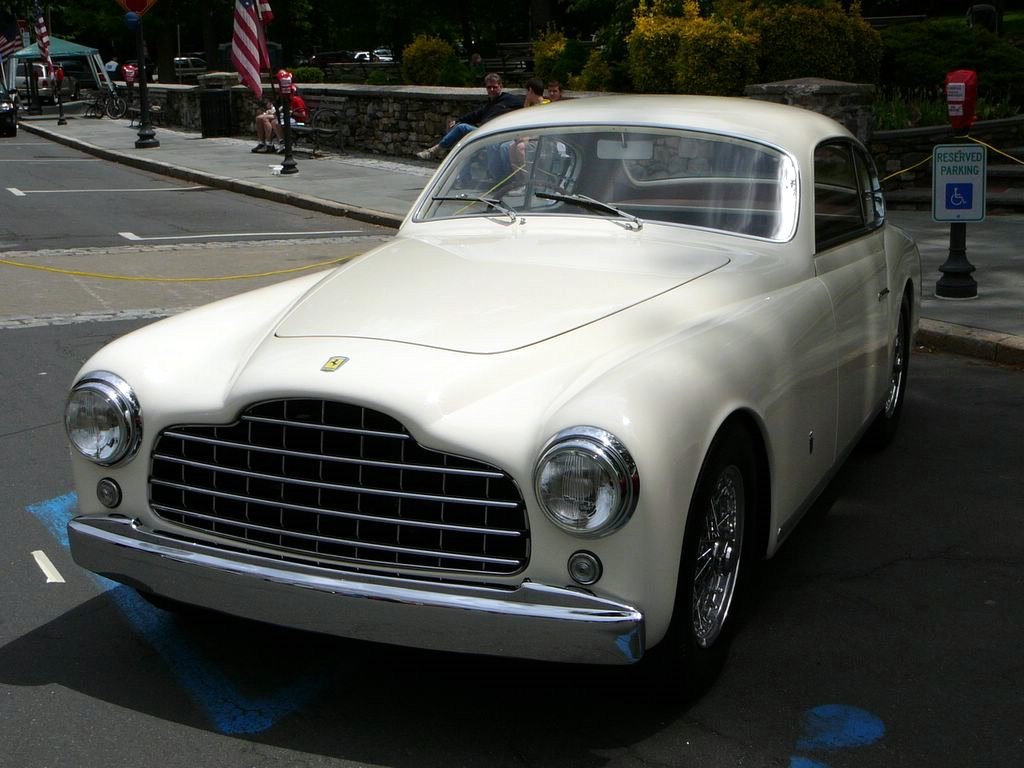
195 Inter (1951)

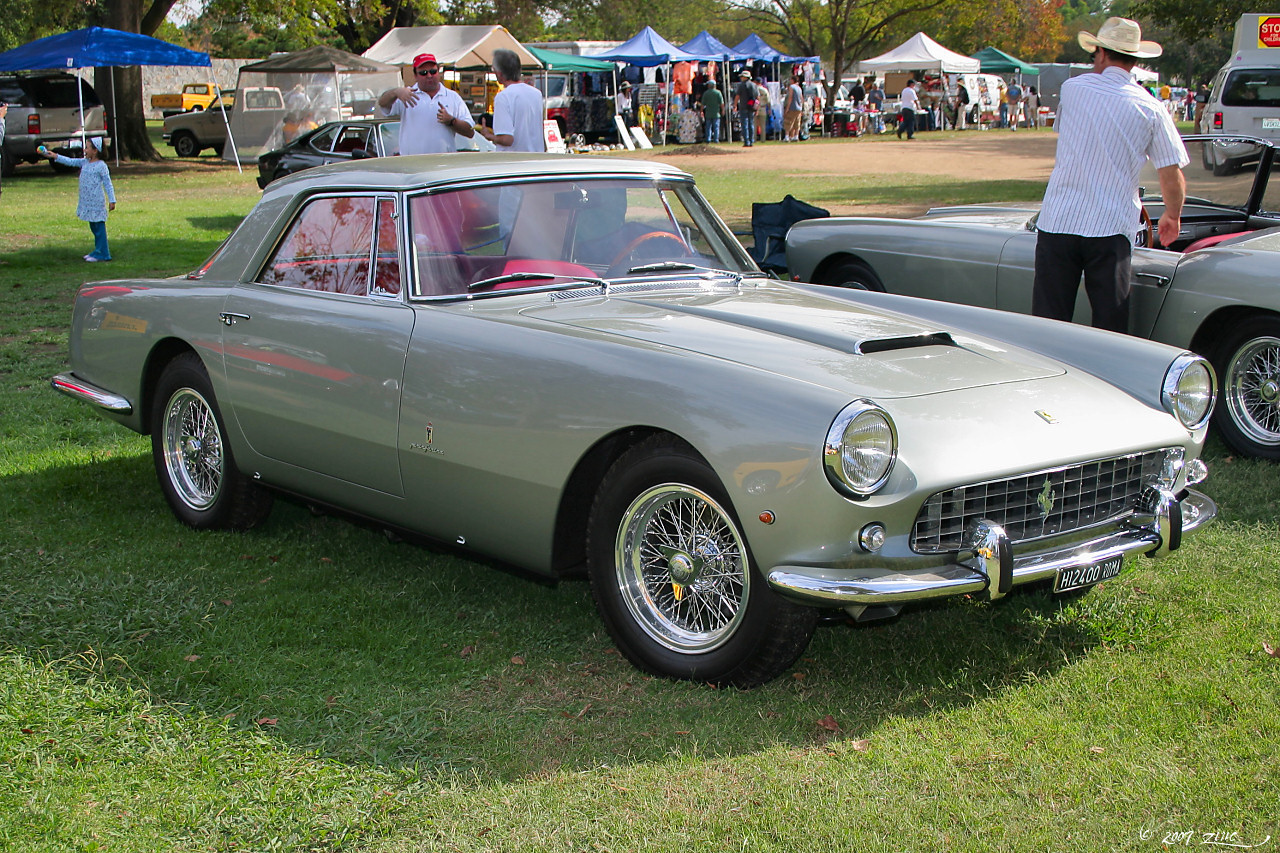
The first series produced Ferrari, the 1958 250 GT Coupé

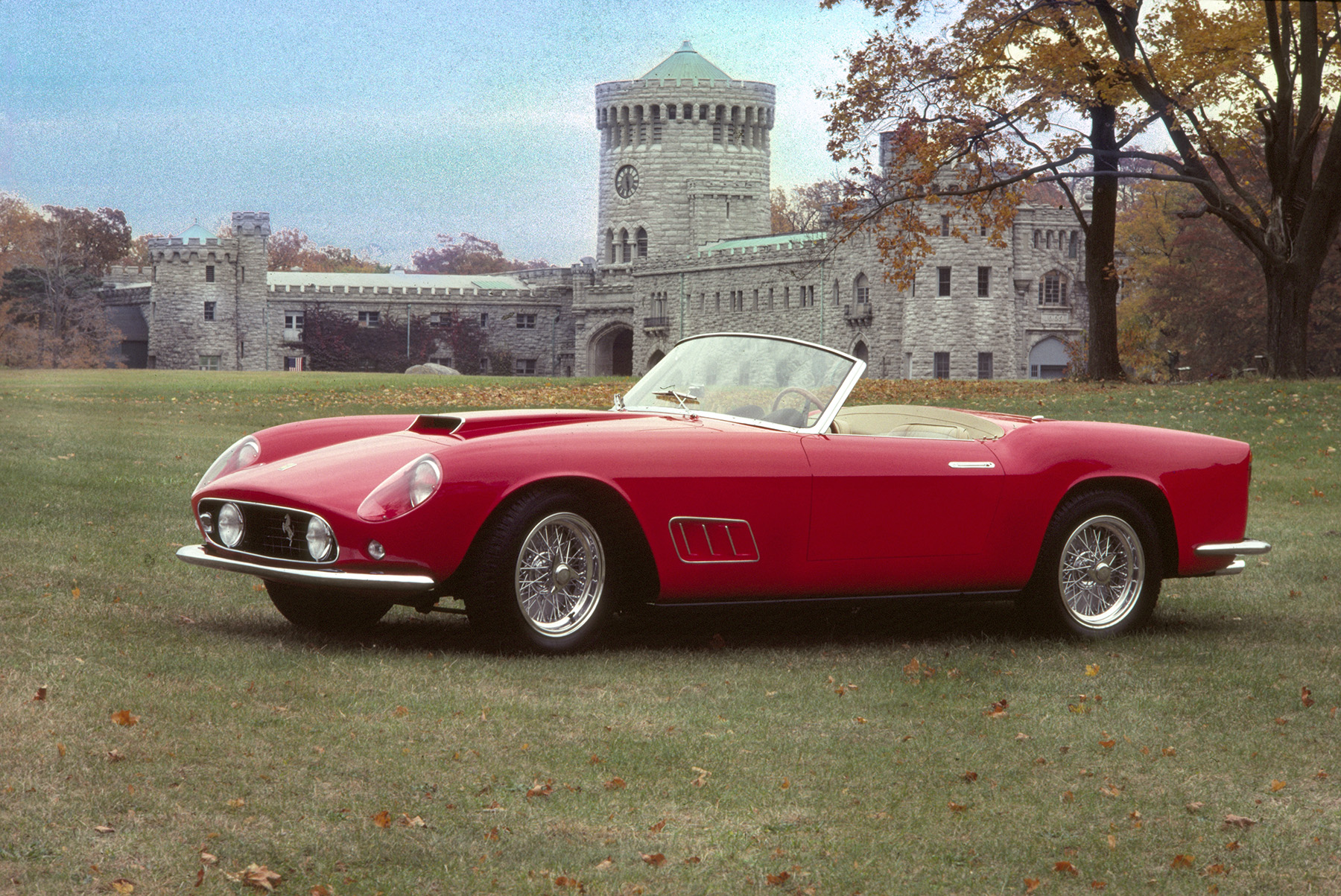
250 GT California Spyder SWB (1959)

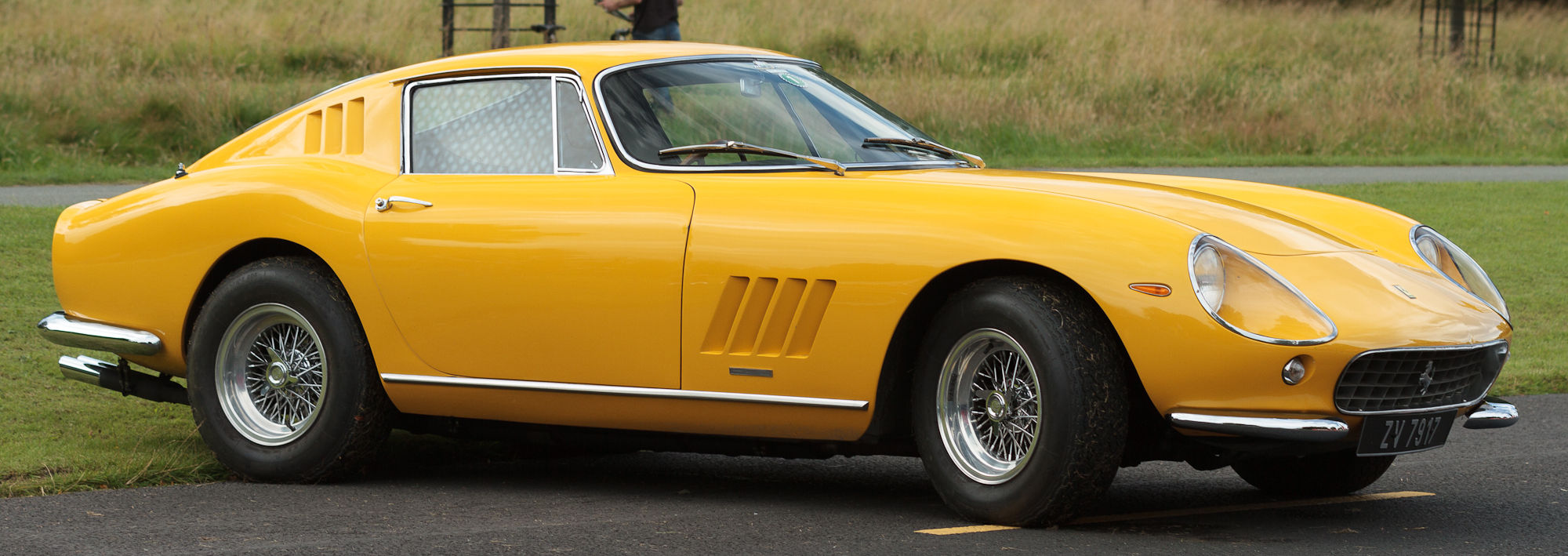
275 GTB

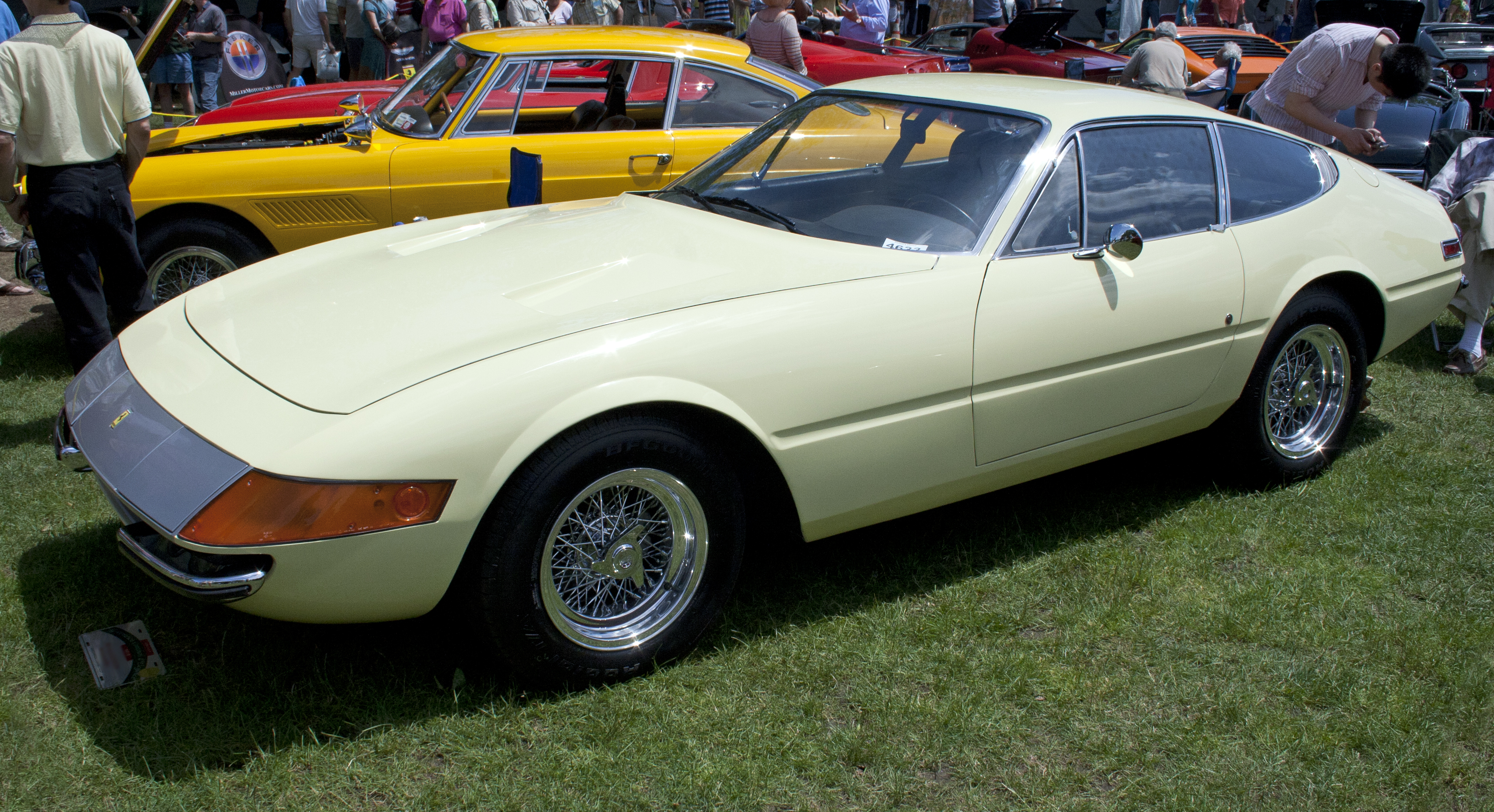
Daytona 365 GTB/4 (1971)

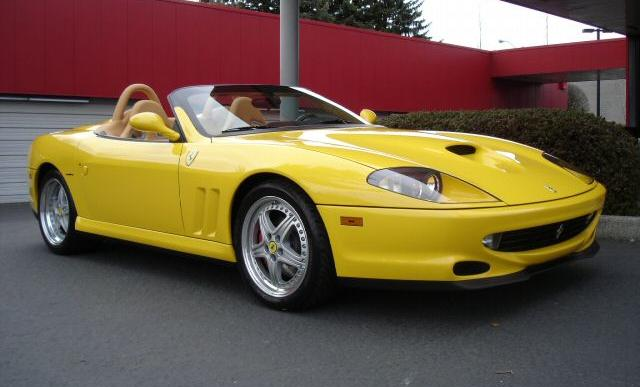
550 Barchetta Pininfarina (2001)

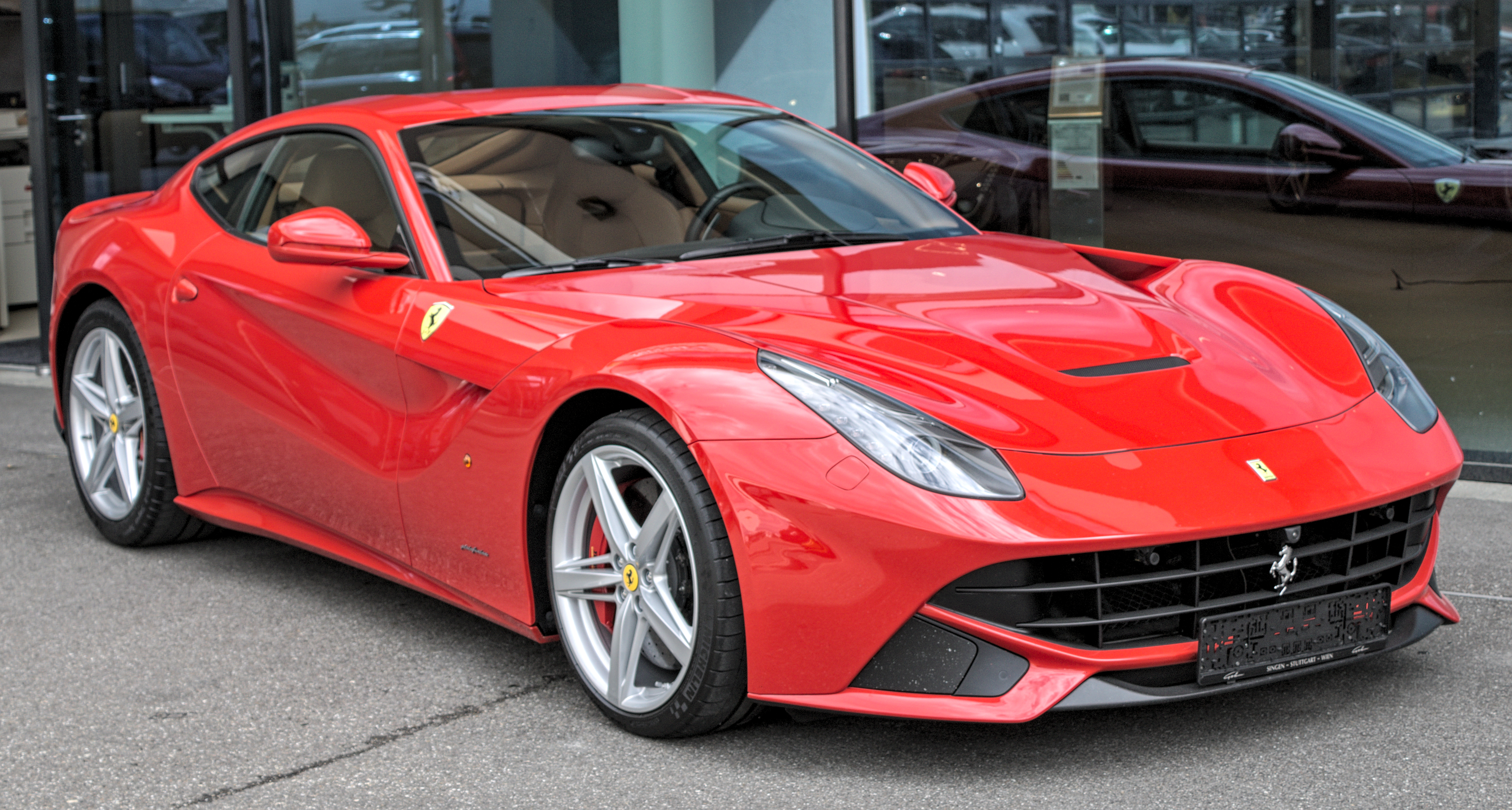
F12 Berlinetta (2012)

Ferrari's first road cars ever produced were V12 grand tourers. This type of car was discontinued in 1973 in favour of mid-engined 12-cylinder sports cars, later brought back in 1996 with the 550 Maranello and made ever since.

- 1948–1952 Inter
  - 1948–1950 166 Inter
  - 1950–1951 195 Inter
  - 1951–1952 212 Inter
- 1950–1966 America
  - 1952 342 America
  - 1953–1954 375 America
  - 1955–1959 410 Superamerica
  - 1959–1964 400 Superamerica
  - 1964–1966 500 Superfast
- 1952–1964 250
  - 1953 250 Europa
  - 1954–1955 250 Europa GT
  - 1955–1957 250 GT Coupé Boano
  - 1957–1958 250 GT Coupé Ellena
  - 1958–1960 250 GT Coupé Pinin Farina
  - 1956–1963 250 GT Berlinetta ("Tour de France" and SWB)
  - 1957–1962 250 GT Cabriolet
  - 1957–1963 250 GT California Spyder
  - 1962–1964 250 GT Berlinetta Lusso
- 1964–1968 275
  - 1964–1965 275 GTB
  - 1964–1965 275 GTS
  - 1966–1968 275 GTB/4
- 1963–1968 330
  - 1966–1968 330 GTC
  - 1966–1968 330 GTS
- 1966–1973 365
  - 1966–1967 365 California
  - 1968–1969 365 GTC
  - 1969–1970 365 GTS
  - 1968–1973 365 GTB/4 (Daytona)
  - 1968–1973 365 GTS/4
- 1973–1984 Berlinetta Boxer
  - 1973–1976 365 GT4 BB
  - 1976–1981 512 BB
  - 1981–1984 512 BBi
- 1984–1996 Testarossa
  - 1984–1992 Testarossa
  - 1992–1994 512 TR
  - 1994–1996 F512 M
- 1996–2006 550 & 575
  - 1996–2001 550 Maranello
  - 2001 550 Barchetta Pininfarina
  - 2002–2006 575M Maranello
  - 2005 Superamerica
- 2006–2012 599
  - 2006–2012 599 GTB Fiorano
  - 2010–2011 599 GTO
  - 2010 SA Aperta
- 2012–2017 F12berlinetta
  - 2015–2017 F12tdf
- 2017–2024 812 Superfast
  - 2019–2024 812 GTS
  - 2021–2024 812 Competizione
  - 2021–2024 812 Competizione A
- 2024– 12Cilindri
  - 2026– 12Cilindri Manuale

=== 4-seat grand tourer ===
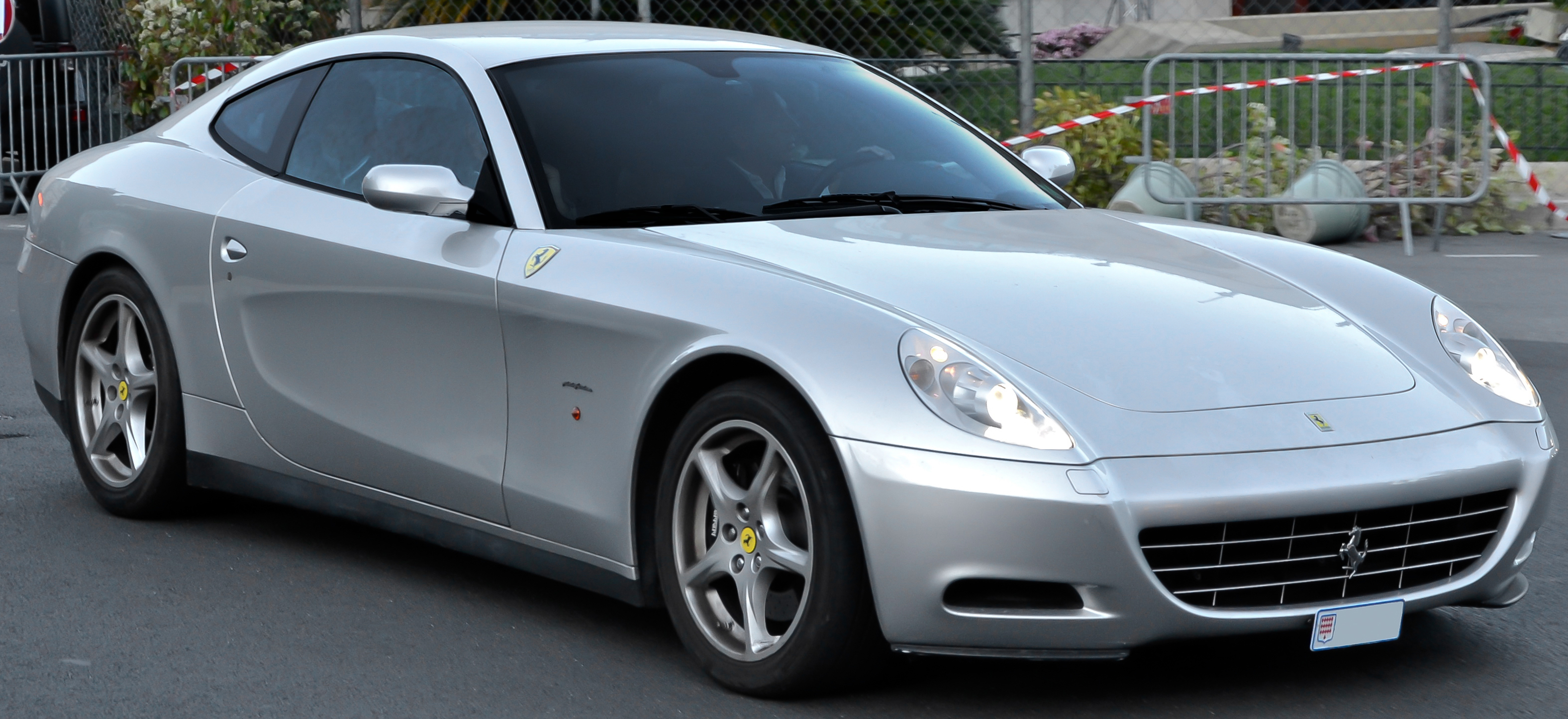
612 Scaglietti

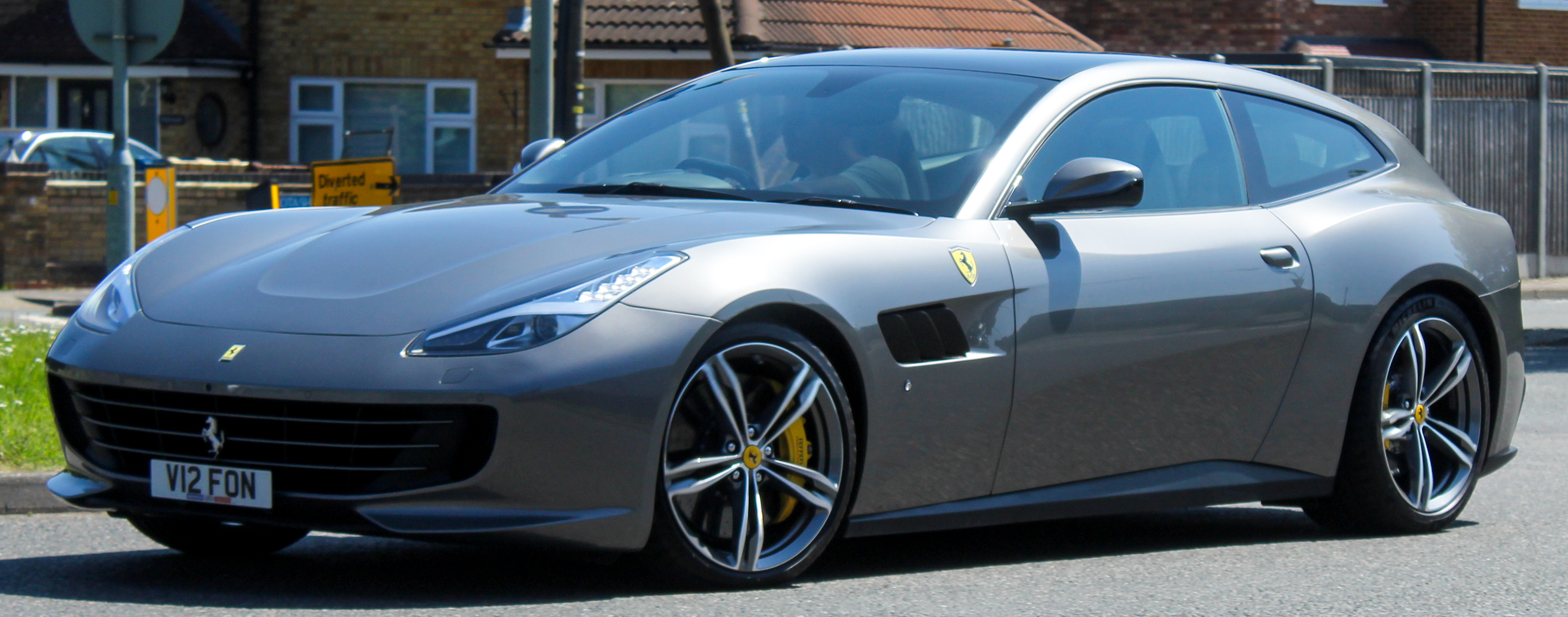
GTC4Lusso

Between 1959 and 2020 the company produced front-engined V12 2+2 cars. In 2023 the 4-door Purosangue succeeded the V12 2+2 series.

- 1959–1963 250 GT/E
- 1963–1964 330 America
- 1964–1967 330 GT 2+2
- 1967–1971 365 GT 2+2
- 1971–1972 365 GTC/4
- 1972–1989 365 GT4 2+2, 400 and 412
  - 1972–1976 365 GT4 2+2
  - 1976–1979 400
  - 1979–1985 400i
  - 1985–1989 412
- 1992–2003 456
  - 1992–1997 456
  - 1998–2003 456M
- 2004–2011 612 Scaglietti
- 2011–2016 FF
- 2016–2020 GTC4Lusso
  - 2017–2020 GTC4Lusso T
- 2023– Purosangue

=== 4-seat sports car ===
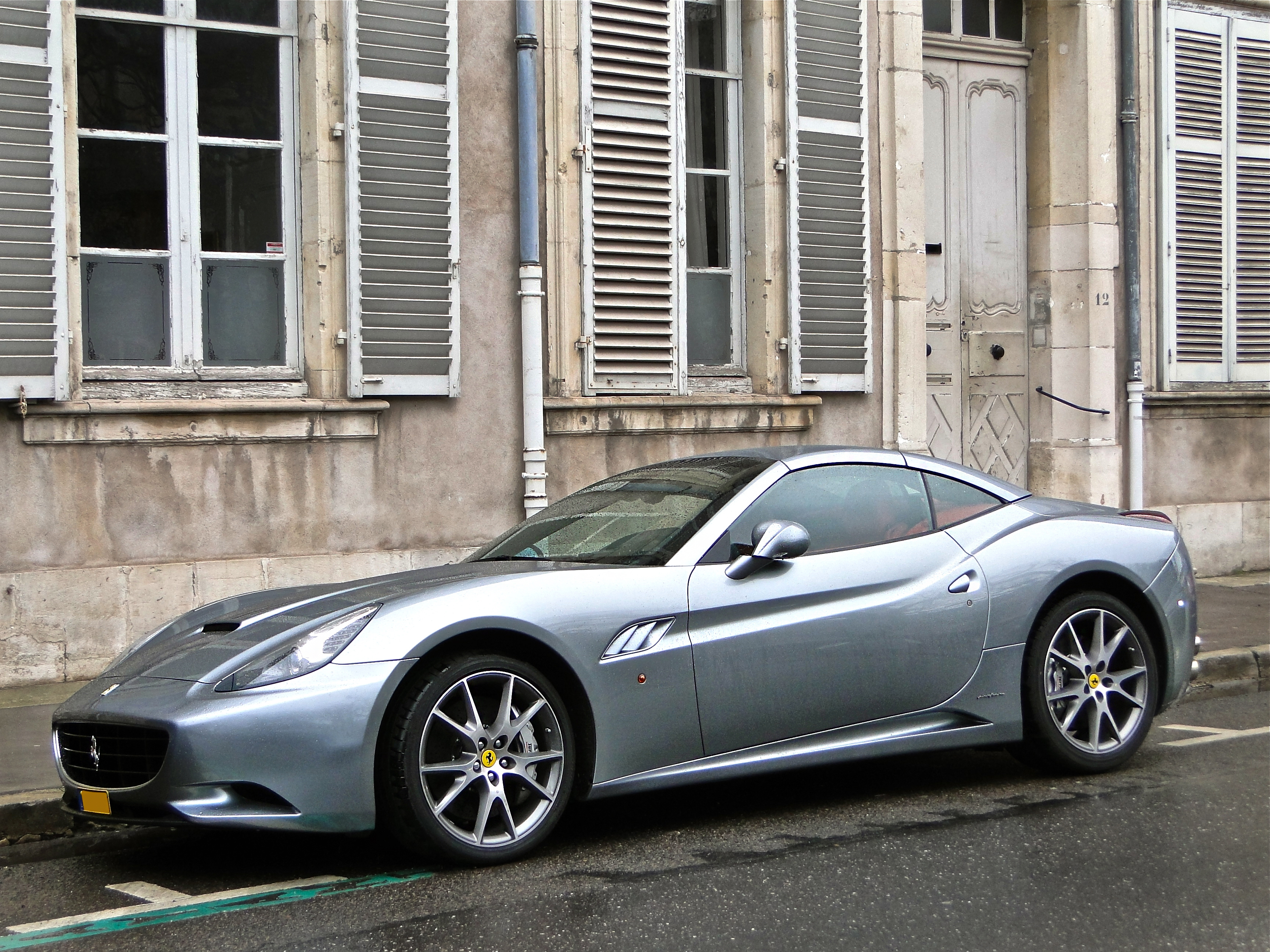
California

The GT4 and Mondial were 2+2 versions of the 308. With the California a new line of entry-level Ferrari's were introduced.

- 1973–1980 GT4
  - 1973–1975 Dino 308 GT4
  - 1976–1980 308 GT4
  - 1975 Dino 208 GT4
  - 1976–1980 208 GT4
- 1980–1993 Mondial
  - 1980–1981 Mondial 8
  - 1982–1985 Mondial Quattrovalvole
  - 1983–1985 Mondial Quattrovalvole Cabriolet
  - 1985–1989 3.2 Mondial & 3.2 Mondial Cabriolet
  - 1989–1993 Mondial T & Mondial T Cabriolet
- 2009–2017 California
  - 2009–2014 California
  - 2014–2017 California T
- 2018–2021 Portofino
  - 2021–2023 Portofino M
- 2020–2024 Roma
  - 2023–2026 Roma Spider
- 2025– Amalfi
  - 2026– Amalfi Spider

=== Mid-engine sports car ===
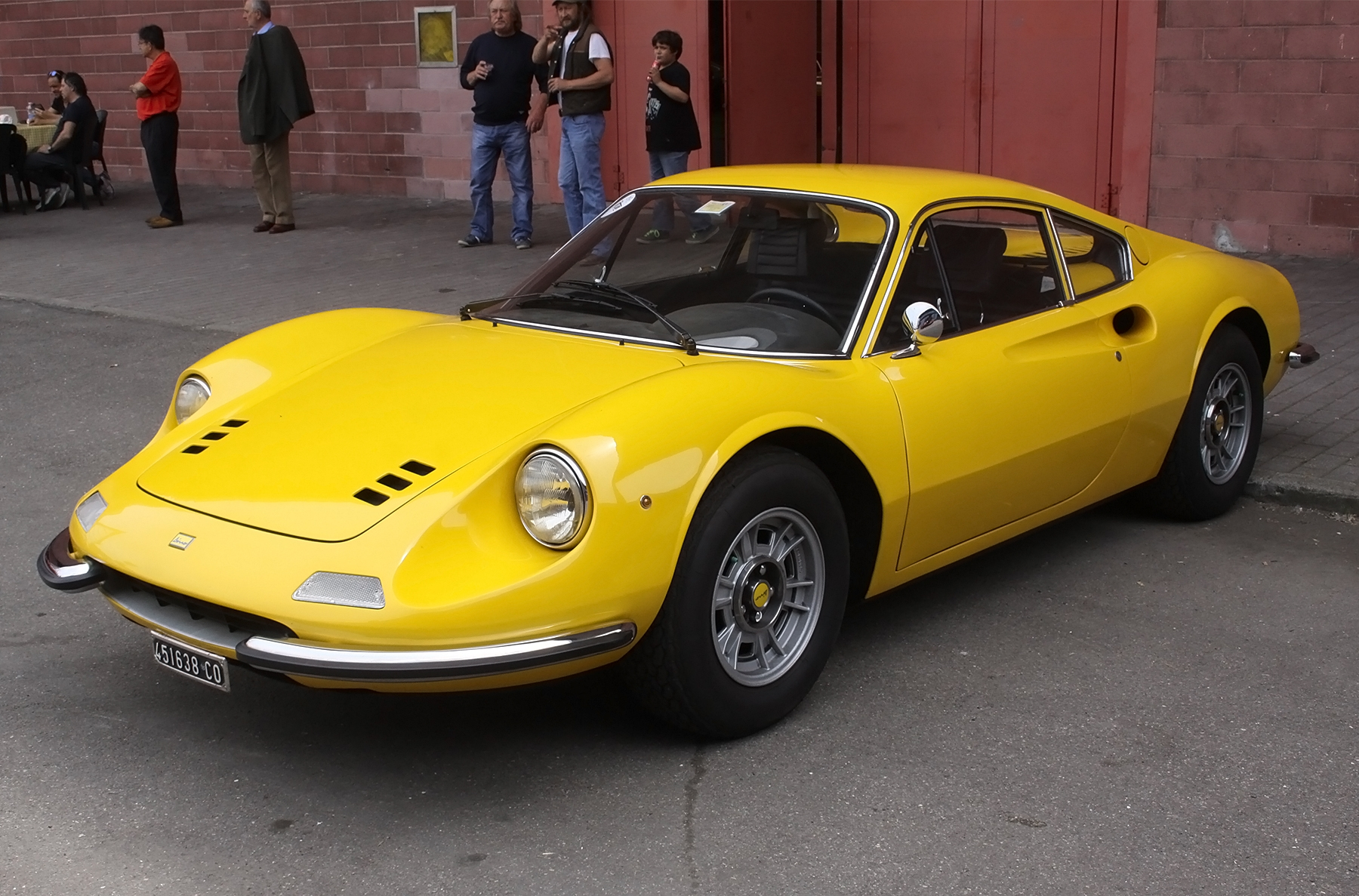
Dino 246 GT

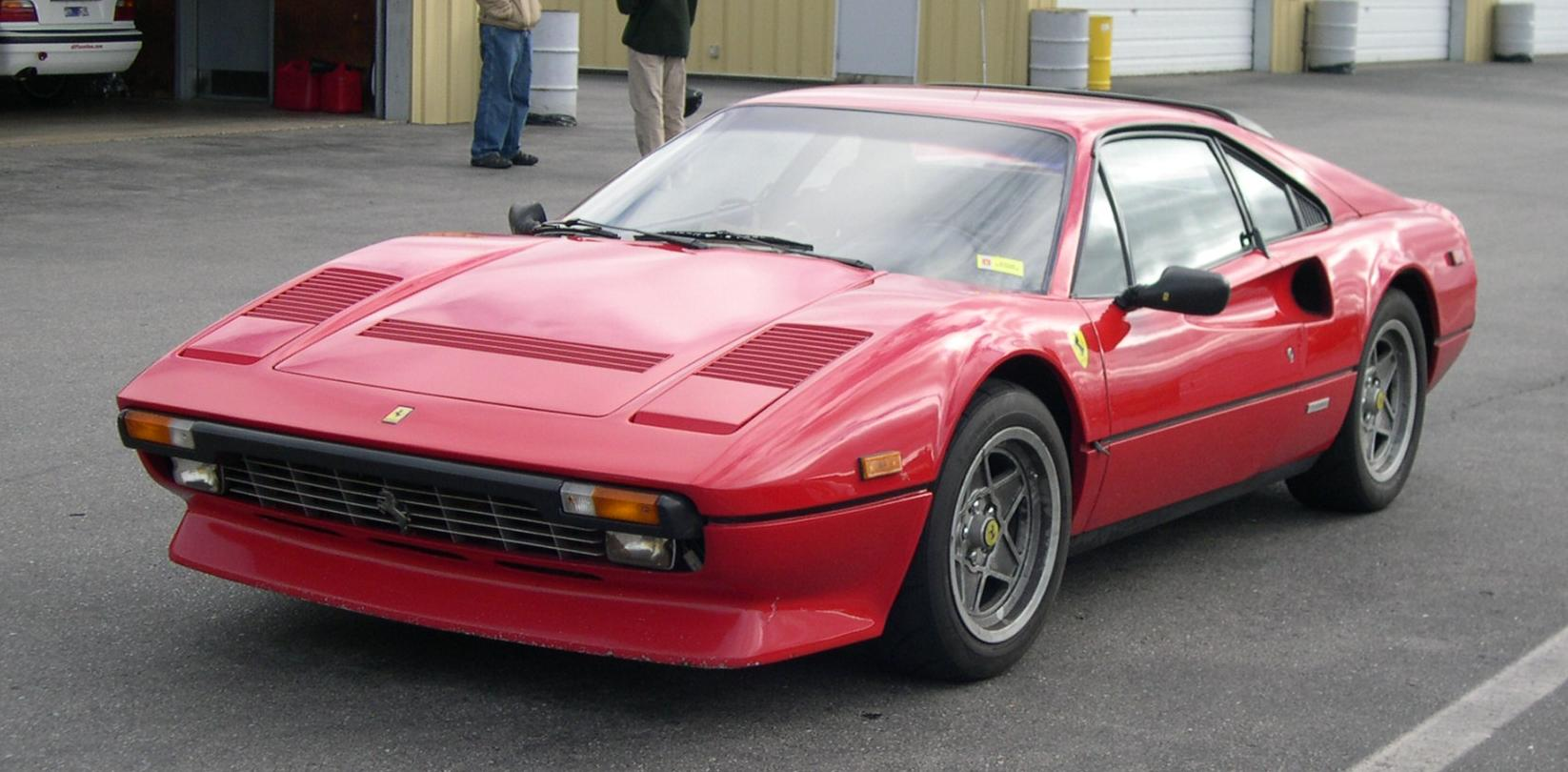
308 GTB (1984)

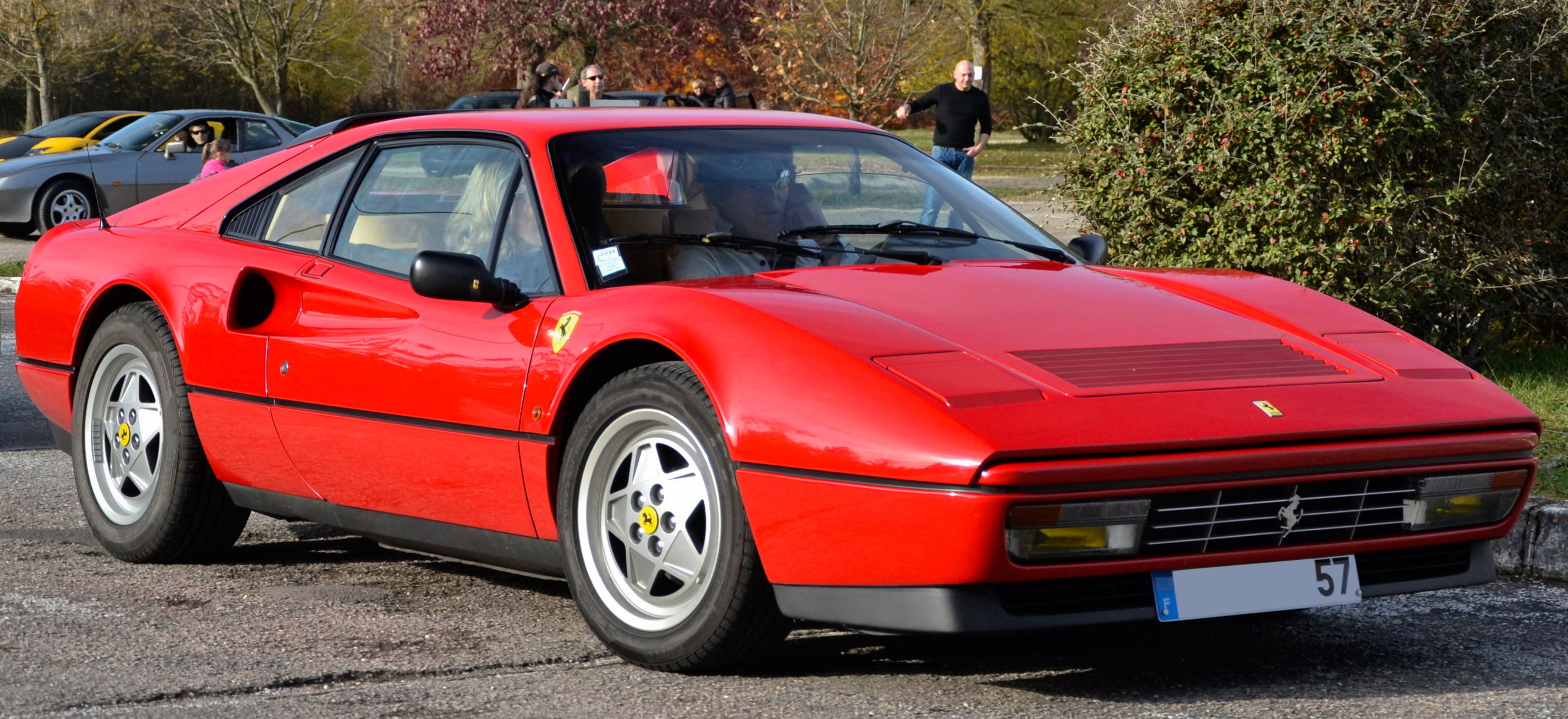
Ferrari 328 GTB (1989)

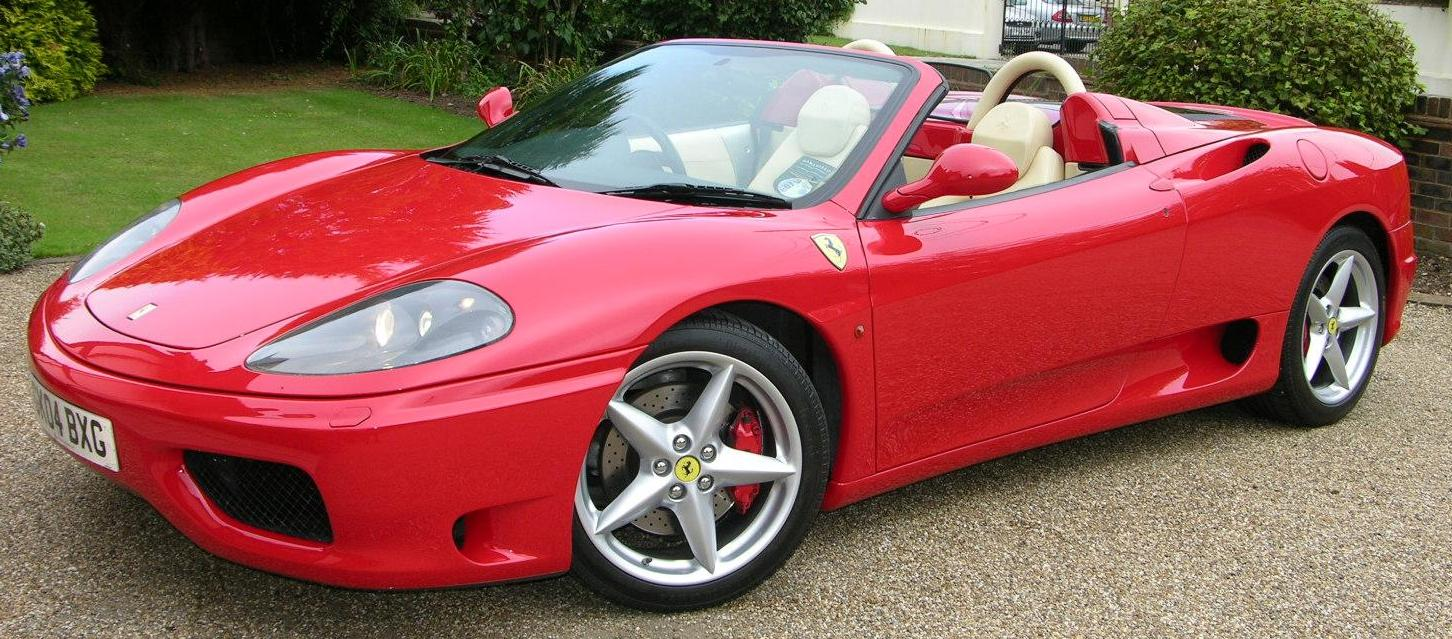
360 Spider

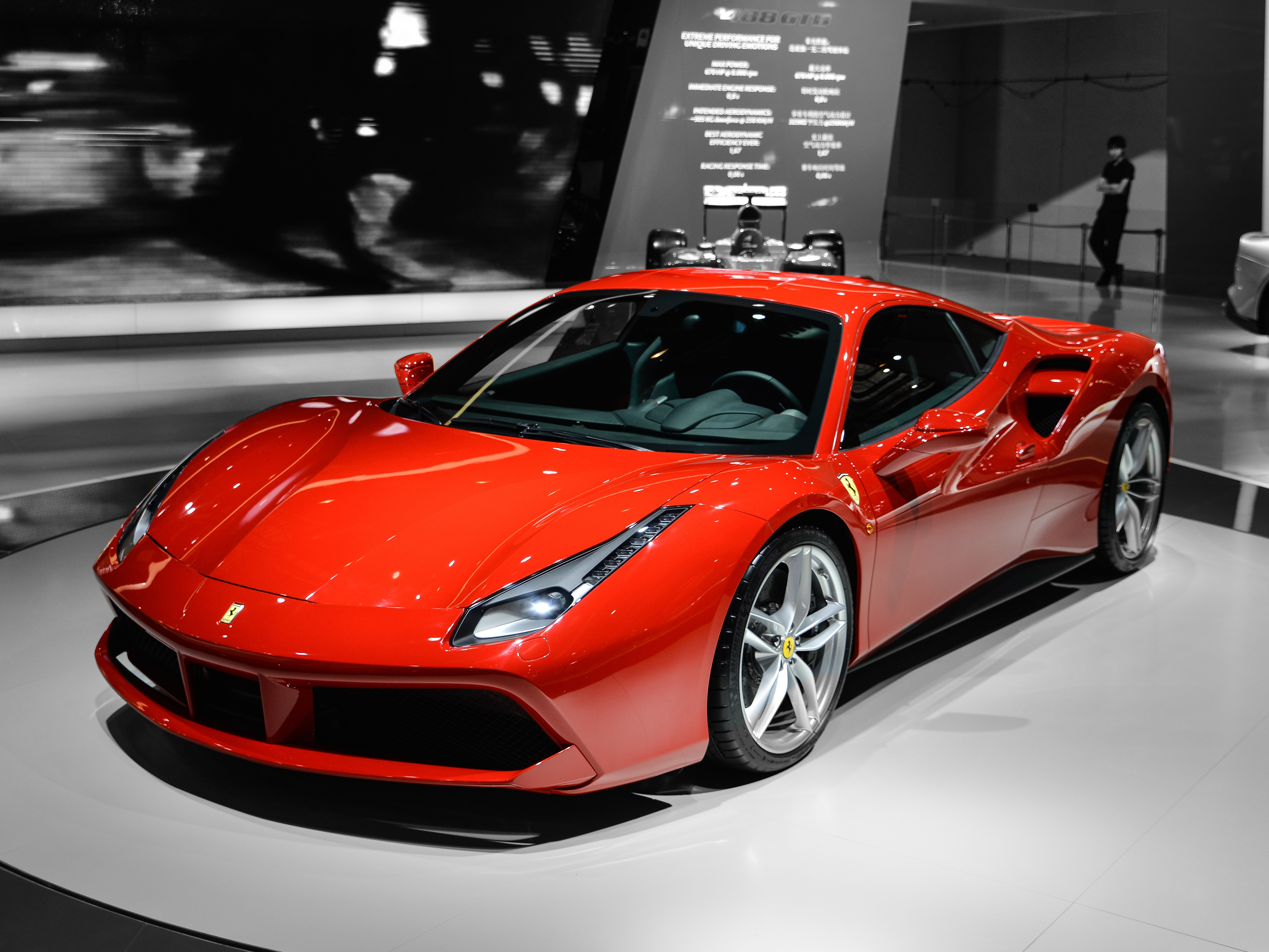
488 GTB (2015)

The Dino was the first mid-engined road car designed and produced by Ferrari. This layout would go on to be used in most Ferraris of the 1980s and 1990s. V6 and V8 Ferrari models make up well over half of the marque's total production.

- 1967–1974 Dino
  - 1967–1969 Dino 206 GT
  - 1969–1974 Dino 246 GT
  - 1972–1974 Dino 246 GTS
- 1975–1985 208/308
  - 1975–1977 308 GTB (vetroresina)
  - 1977–1979 308 GTB & GTS
  - 1980–1981 208 GTB & GTS
  - 1980–1981 308 GTBi & GTSi
  - 1982–1985 208 GTB Turbo
  - 1983–1985 208 GTS Turbo
  - 1982–1985 308 GTB & GTS Quattrovalvole
- 1985–1989 328
  - 1986–1989 328 GTB & GTS
  - 1986–1989 GTB & GTS Turbo
- 1989–1994 348
  - 1989–1993 348 TB & TS
  - 1993–1994 348 GTB, GTS & Spider
- 1994–1999 F355
  - 1994–1999 F355 Berlinetta
  - 1995–1999 F355 Spider & GTS
  - 1997–1999 355 F1
- 1999–2004 360
  - 1999–2004 360 Modena & Spider
  - 2003–2004 360 Challenge Stradale
- 2005–2009 F430
  - 2005–2009 F430 & F430 Spider
  - 2007–2009 430 Scuderia
  - 2008–2009 430 Scuderia Spider 16M
- 2009–2015 458
  - 2009–2015 458 Italia
  - 2011–2015 458 Spider
  - 2013–2015 458 Speciale
  - 2014–2015 458 Speciale A
- 2015–2020 488
  - 2015–2019 488 GTB & 488 Spider
  - 2018–2020 488 Pista & 488 Pista Spider
- 2019–2023 F8
  - 2019–2023 F8 Tributo & F8 Spider
- 2021– 296
  - 2021– 296 GTB & 296 GTS
  - 2025– 296 Speciale

=== Mid-engine supercar ===
While using a similar layout to the F8 Tributo, the SF90 introduced a line of mid-engine cars positioned above the mid-engine sports cars.

- 2019–2024 SF90 Stradale
  - 2023–2026 SF90 Stradale, SF90 Spider & SF90 XX
- 2025– 849 Testarossa

=== Electric ===
- 2026– Luce

=== Icona ===
The cars mark the start of a new lineage of models called the "Icona" series, a program aimed at creating special cars inspired by classic Ferrari models, all to be produced in limited series.

- 2019–2022 Monza SP1 and SP2
- 2021–2025 Daytona SP3

=== Flagship supercar ===
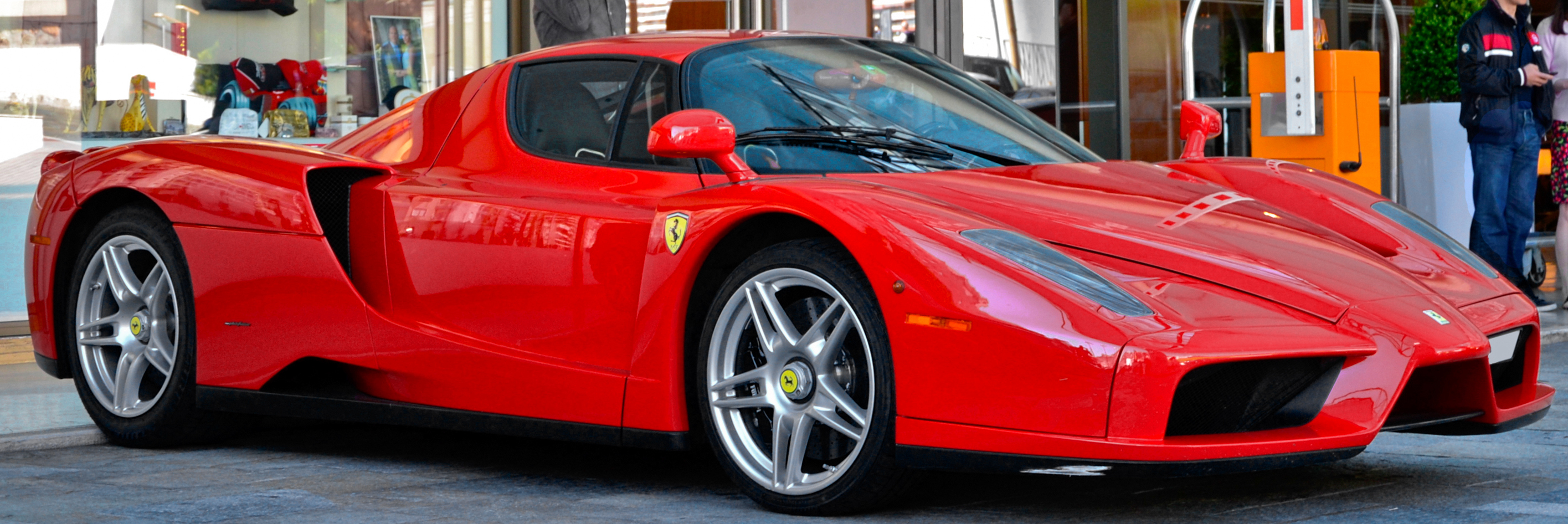
Ferrari Enzo

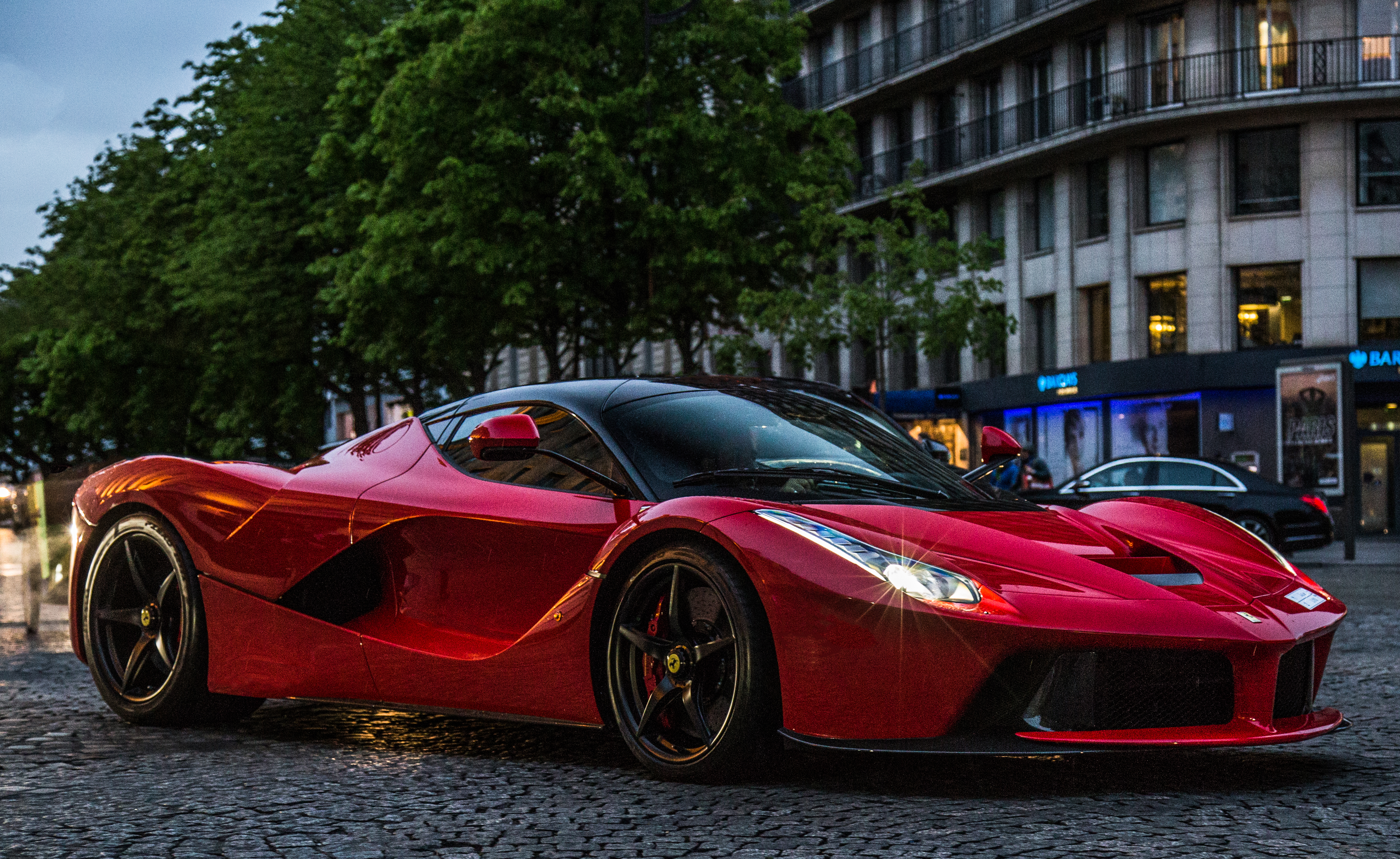
LaFerrari

The pinnacle of the company's road cars are supercars produced in limited numbers; 288 GTO was initially designed for racing homologation.

- 1984–1985 288 GTO
- 1987–1992 F40
- 1995–1997 F50
  - 1996 F50 GT
- 2002–2004 Enzo
- 2013–2016 LaFerrari
  - 2016–2018 LaFerrari Aperta
- 2025– F80

=== One-off & few-off ===
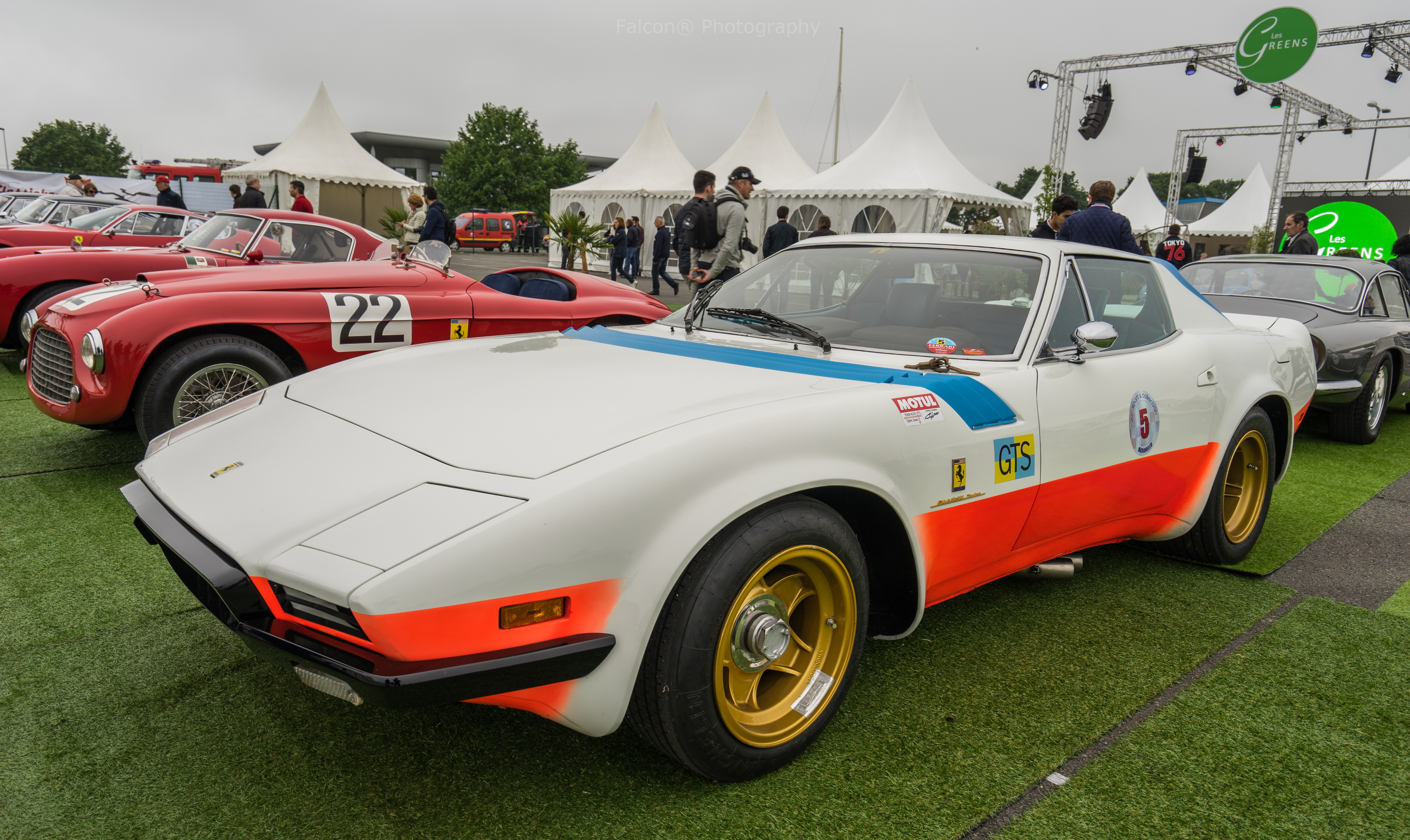
Ferrari 365 GTB/4 NART Spider (1972)

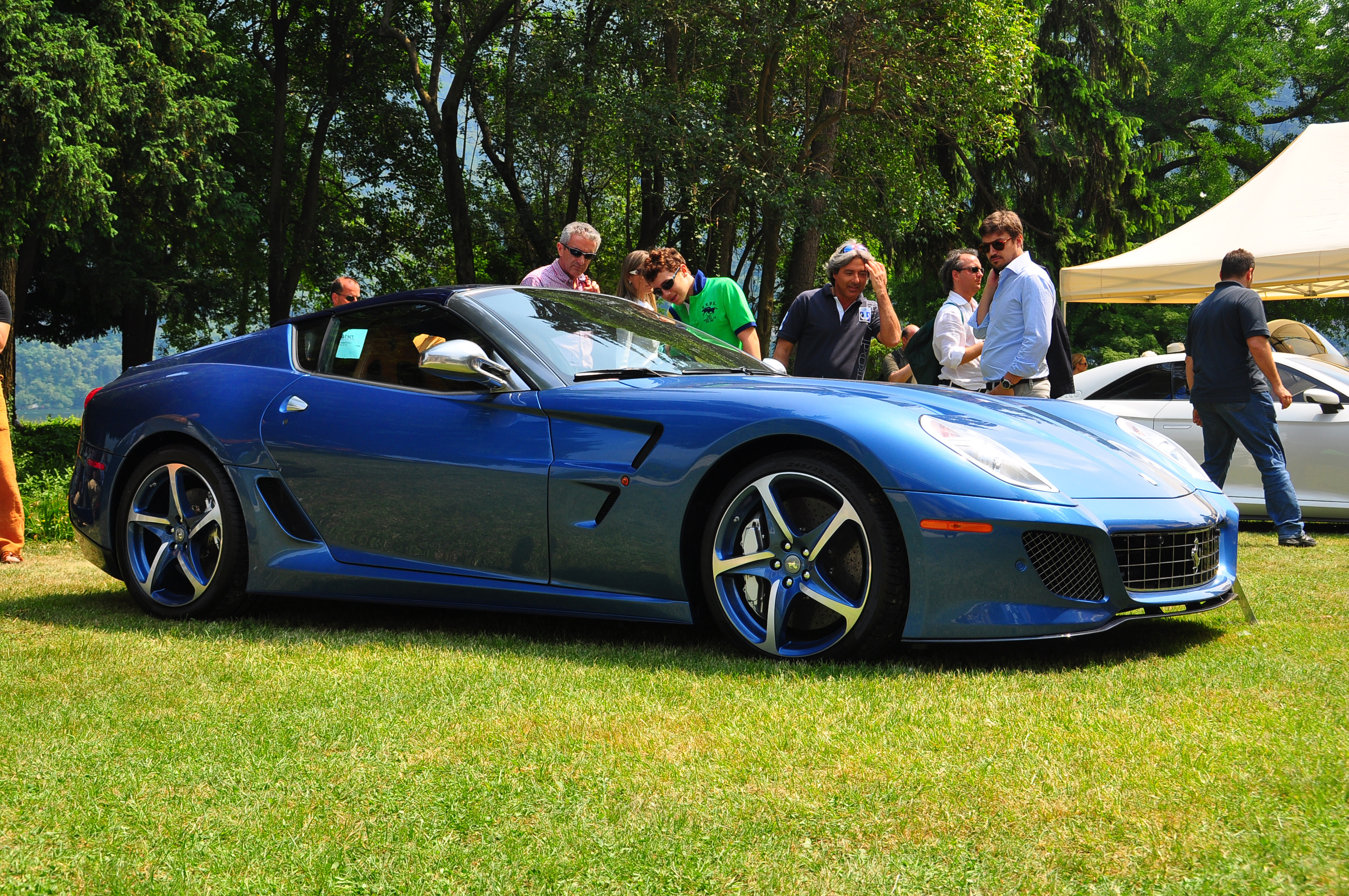
Superamerica 45 (2011)

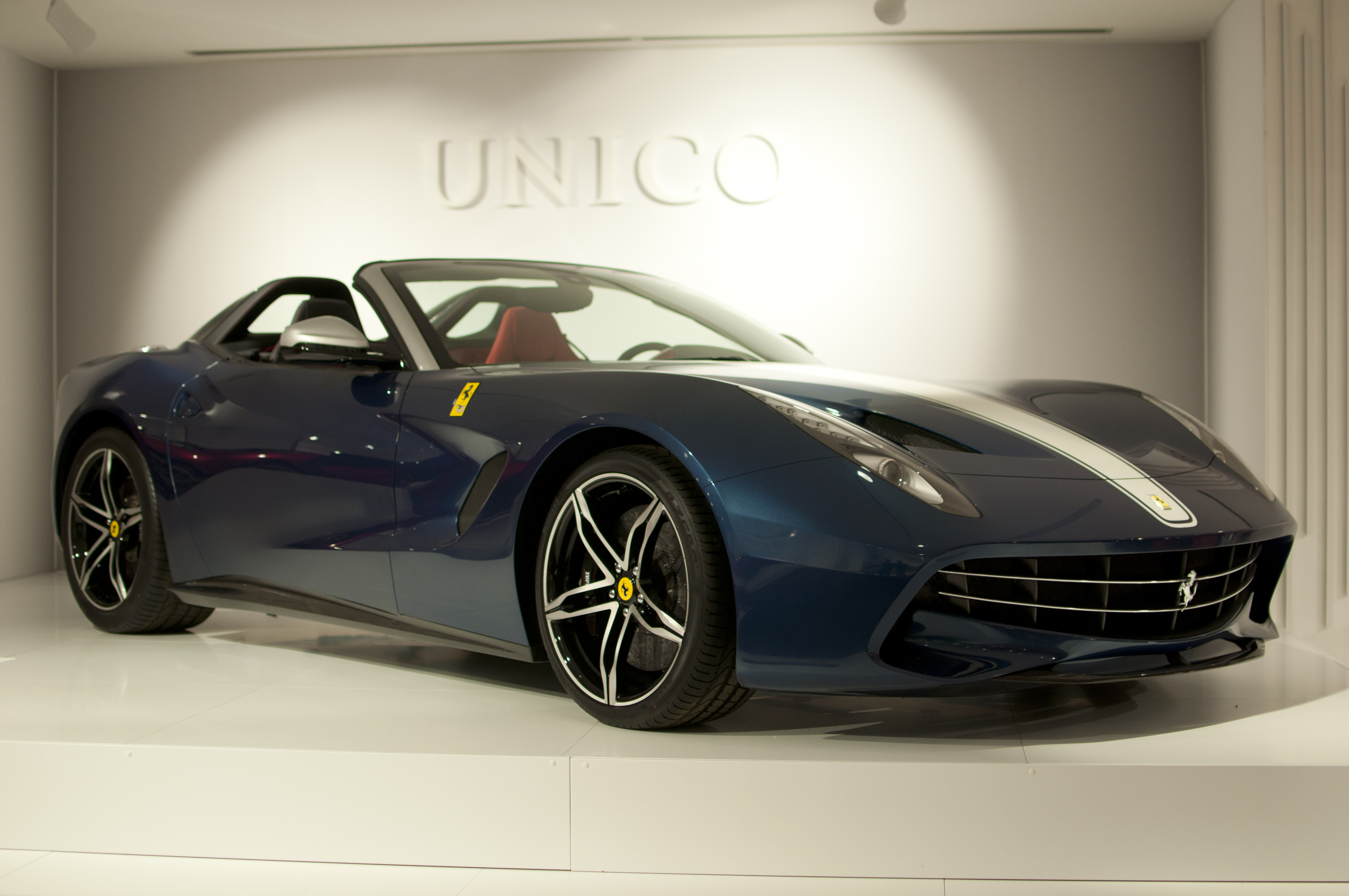
Ferrari F60 America (2014)

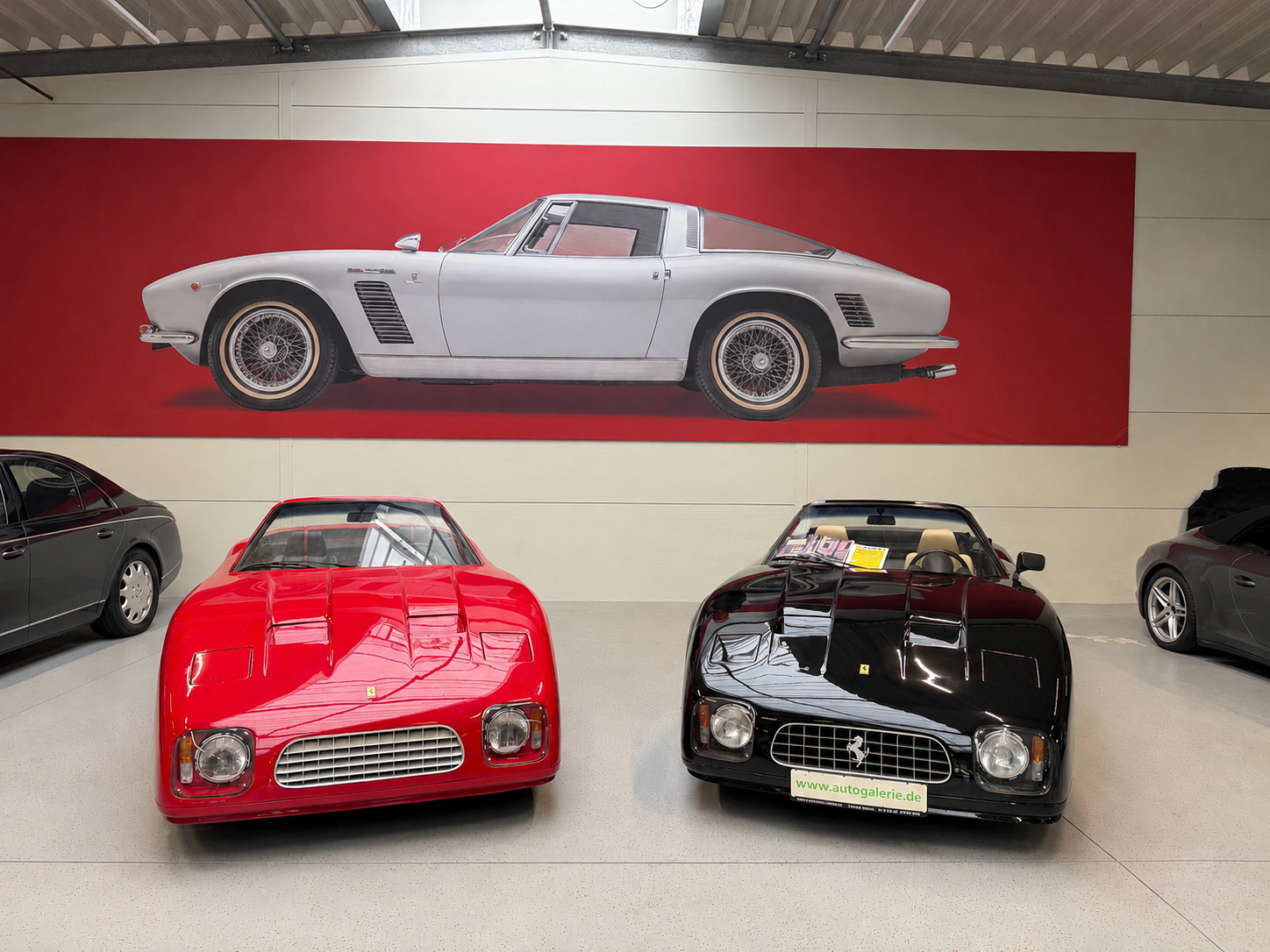
Both of the Ferrari 365 GT 2+2 NART Spyder (12605 and 12611) in the Autogalerie Sinzig, Germany

- 1952 Ferrari 225 Inter
- 1954 Ferrari 375 MM "Ingrid Bergman"
- 1956 Ferrari 250 GT Pinin Farina Coupé Speciale
- 1969 Ferrari 365 GT 2+2 NART Spyder "Grintosa"
- 1971 Ferrari 3Z Spider
- 1971 Ferrari 365 GTB/4 Michelotti NART Spider
- 1975 Ferrari 365 GTB/4 Shooting Brake
- 1986 Testarossa Spider
- 1987 Ferrari PPG Pace Car
- 1988 Ferrari F90
- 1995 Ferrari FX
- 1996 Ferrari 456 GT Venice
- 1996 Ferrari F50 Bolide
- 2006 Ferrari P4/5
- 2006 Ferrari Zagato 575 GTZ
- 2008 Ferrari SP1 (not to be confused with the Monza SP1)
- 2009 Ferrari P540 Superfast Aperta
- 2011 Ferrari Superamerica 45
- 2012 Ferrari SP12 EC
- 2013 Ferrari SP30 Arya
- 2013 Ferrari SP FFX
- 2014 Ferrari F12 TRS
- 2014 Ferrari SP America
- 2014 Ferrari F60 America
- 2015 Ferrari Touring Berlinetta Lusso
- 2015 Ferrari Sergio
- 2015 Ferrari F12berlinetta SG50 Edition
- 2016 Ferrari 458 MM Speciale
- 2016 Ferrari SP275 RW Competizione
- 2017 Ferrari J50
- 2018 Ferrari SP38 Deborah
- 2018 Ferrari SP3JC
- 2019 Ferrari P80/C
- 2020 Ferrari Omologata
- 2021 Ferrari BR20
- 2022 Ferrari SP48 Unica
- 2022 Ferrari SP51
- 2023 Ferrari KC23
- 2023 Ferrari SP-8
- 2025 Ferrari SC40

=== Concept ===
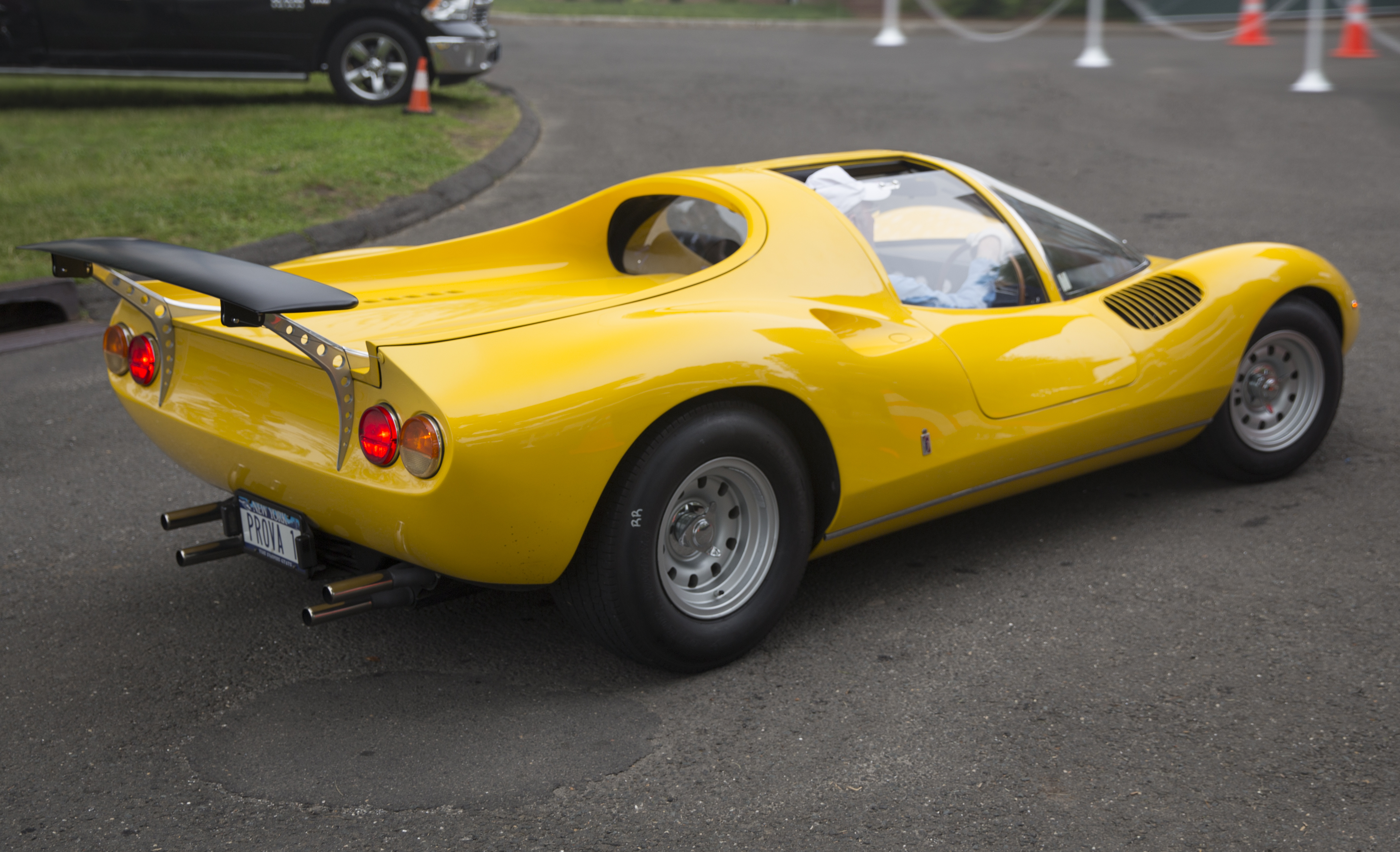
1967 Dino 206 Competizione Prototipo by Pininfarina

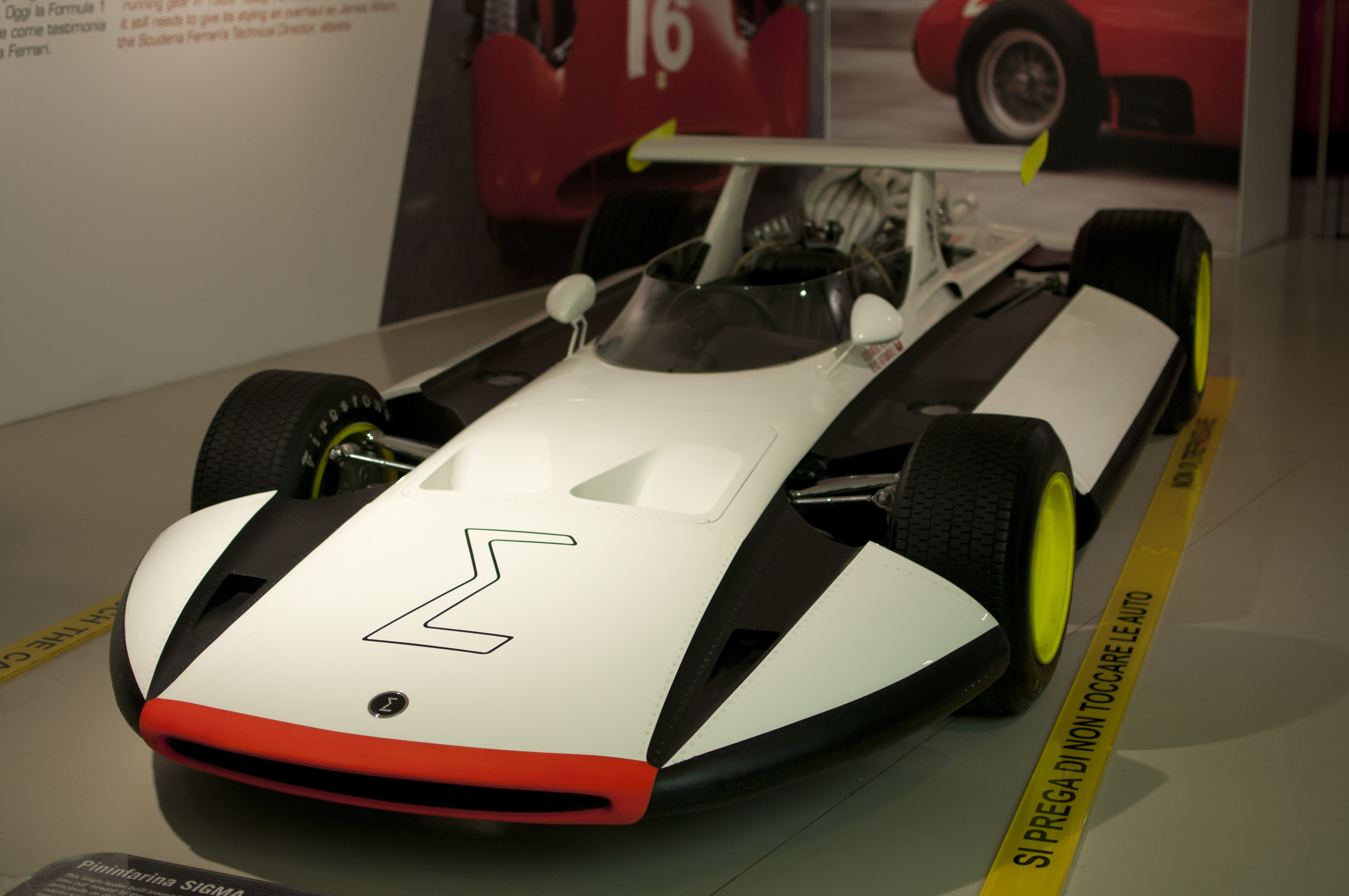
Sigma (1969)

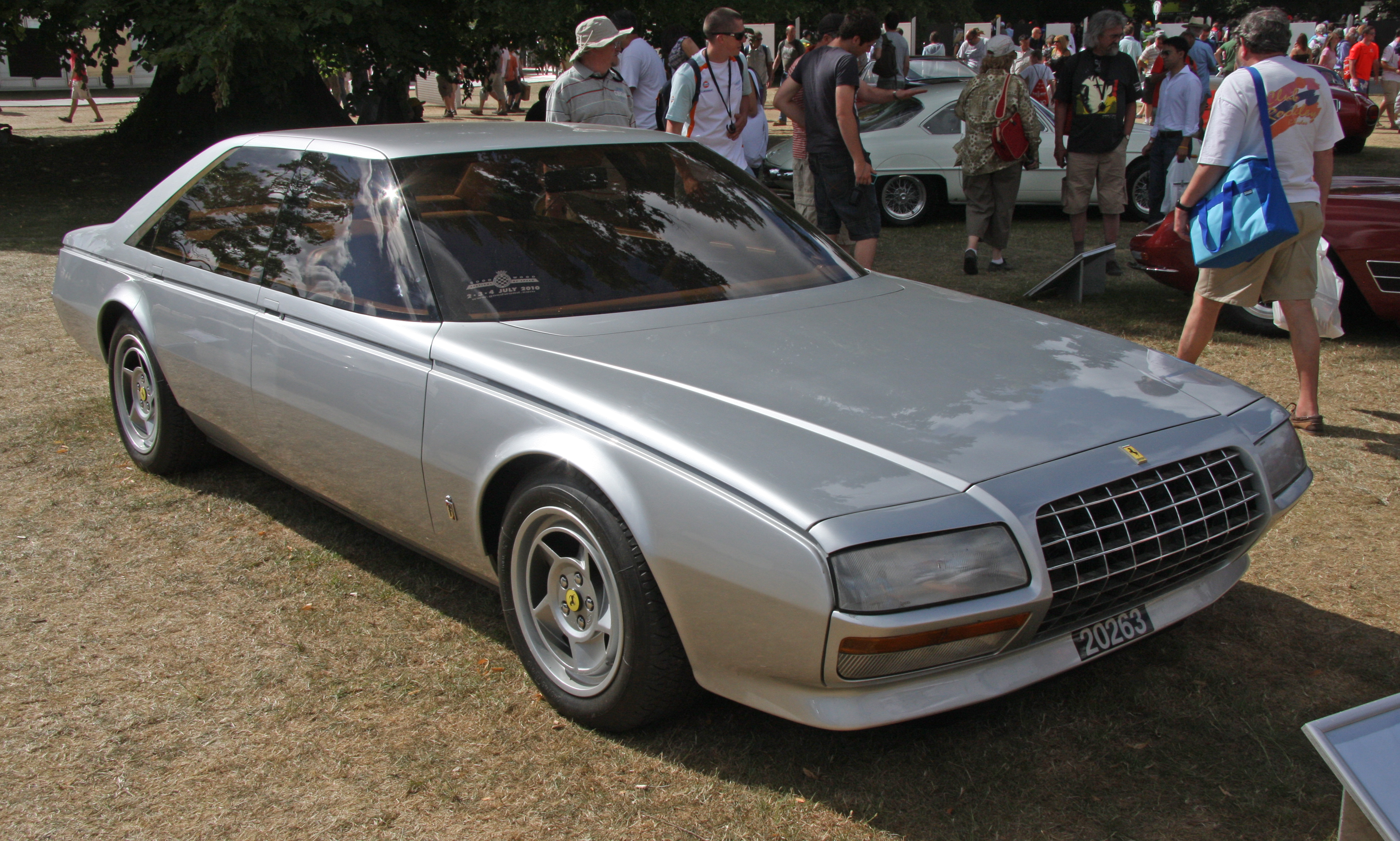
Pinin (1980)

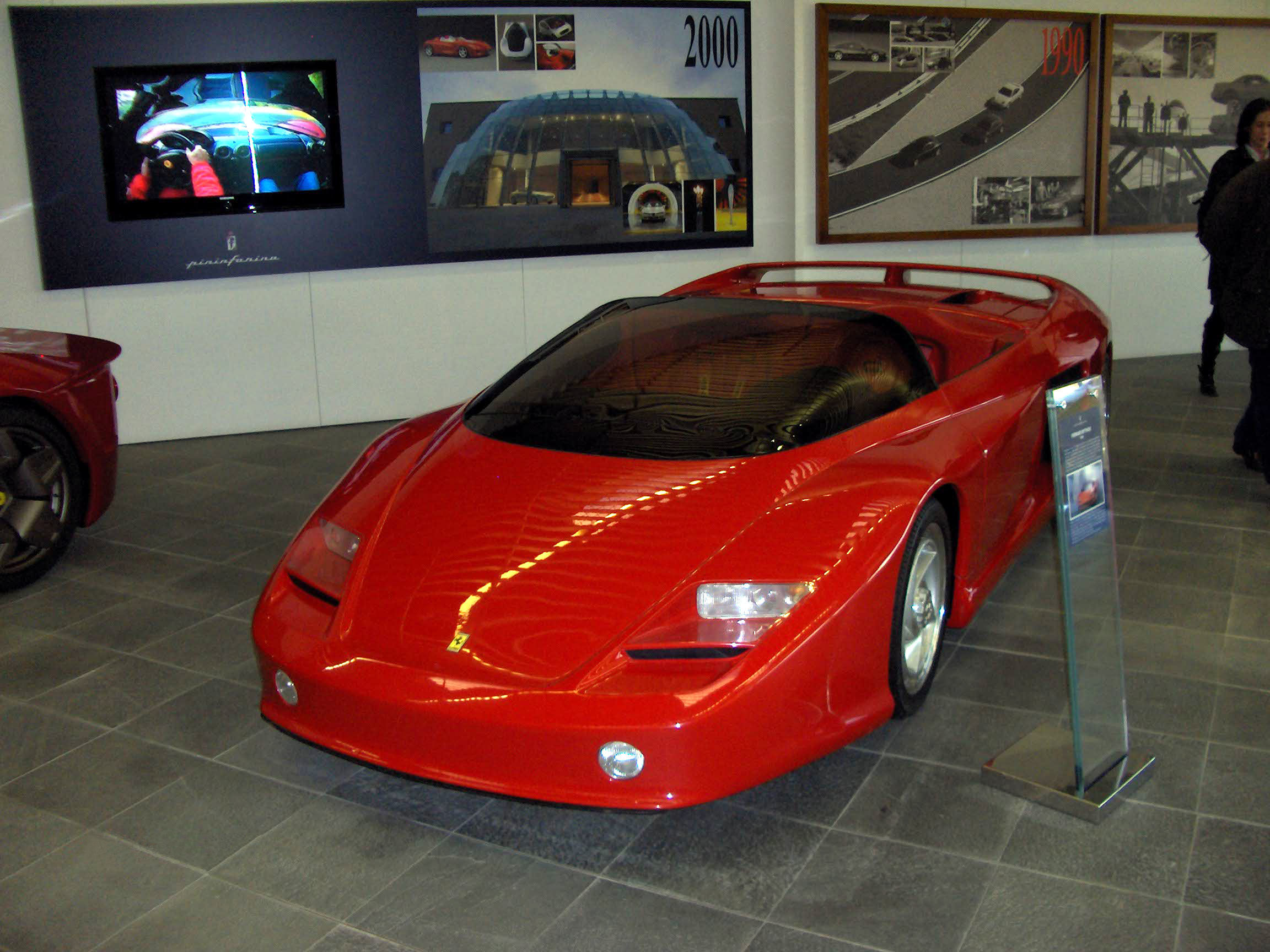
Mythos (1989)

- 1965 Dino Berlinetta Speciale (Pininfarina)
- 1966 Dino Berlinetta GT (Pininfarina)
- 1966 Ferrari 365 P Berlinetta Speciale (Pininfarina)
- 1967 Dino Berlinetta Competizione (Pininfarina)
- 1968 Ferrari 250 P5 Berlinetta Speciale (Pininfarina)
- 1968 Ferrari P6 (Pininfarina)
- 1969 Ferrari Sigma Grand Prix (Pininfarina)
- 1969 Ferrari 512 S Berlinetta Speciale (Pininfarina)
- 1970 Ferrari Modulo (Pininfarina)
- 1980 Ferrari Pinin (Pininfarina)
- 1987 Ferrari 408 4RM (Ferrari)
- 1989 Ferrari Mythos (Pininfarina)
- 1989 Colani Ferrari Testa d'Oro (Luigi Colani)
- 1993 Ferrari FZ93 (Zagato)
- 2000 Ferrari Rossa (Pininfarina)
- 2005 Ferrari GG50 (Giorgetto Giugiaro)
- 2005 Ferrari Ascari (Istituto Europeo di Design)
- 2010 Ferrari Millechili (University of Modena and Reggio Emilia, faculty of Mechanical Engineering / Ferrari)
- 2013 Pininfarina Sergio (Pininfarina)
- 2022 Ferrari Vision Gran Turismo

== See also ==
- List of Ferrari competition cars
- List of Ferrari engines
