= Benuzzi =

Benuzzi (Italian pronunciation: [beˈnuttsi]) is an Italian surname. Notable people with the surname include:

- Dario Benuzzi (born 1946), Italian test driver
- Felice Benuzzi (1910–1988), Italian mountaineer, author of No Picnic on Mount Kenya

== See also ==
- Benazzi
