= Ferrari Circuit =

Ferrari Circuit could refer to a number of motor racing circuits:

- Autodromo Internazionale Enzo e Dino Ferrari, commonly referred to as "Imola Circuit"
- Fiorano Circuit, a private racetrack owned by Ferrari for development and testing purposes
- Mugello Circuit, a racetrack owned by Ferrari used in the Formula One 2020 Tuscan Grand Prix

== See also ==
- Monza Circuit, host of the Italian Grand Prix, considered a home race for Scuderia Ferrari
