= Benassi =

Benassi is an Italian surname from Emilia. Notable people with the surname include:

- Alle Benassi, Italian songwriter and music producer
- Benny Benassi (born 1967), Italian DJ and music producer
- Elisabetta Benassi (born 1966), Italian artist
- Maatje Benassi (born c. 1970), U.S. Army reservist and cyclist who was mistakenly accused to be the COVID-19 "Patient Zero"
- Maikol Benassi (born 1989), Italian footballer
- Marco Benassi (born 1994), Italian footballer
- Massimiliano Benassi (born 1981), Italian footballer
- Maximilian Benassi, Italian sprint canoeist
- Memo Benassi (1886–1957), Italian actor
- Pietro Benassi (born 1958), Italian diplomat
- Ugo Benassi (1928–2011), Italian politician

== Other uses ==
- Benassi Bros., dance music duo consisting of Benny and Alle Benassi

== See also ==
- Benassai
- Benassit
- Bénassy
- Benazzi
