= Benazzi =

Benazzi is an Italian surname from Emilia or a romanization of the Arabic patronymic Bin ʿAzzī (بن عزي). Notable people with the surname include:

- Abdelatif Benazzi (born 1968), French-Moroccan rugby union player
- Mario Benazzi (1902–1997), Italian zoologist
- Vágner Benazzi (born 1954), Brazilian footballer and manager

== See also ==
- Benassi
- Ben Azzai
- Diurodrilus benazzii, a species of annelid worms
- Dugesia benazzii, a species of planarians
- Polycelis benazzii, a species of planarians
