= Fiorano Circuit =

Private race track in Italy

Circuito di Fiorano
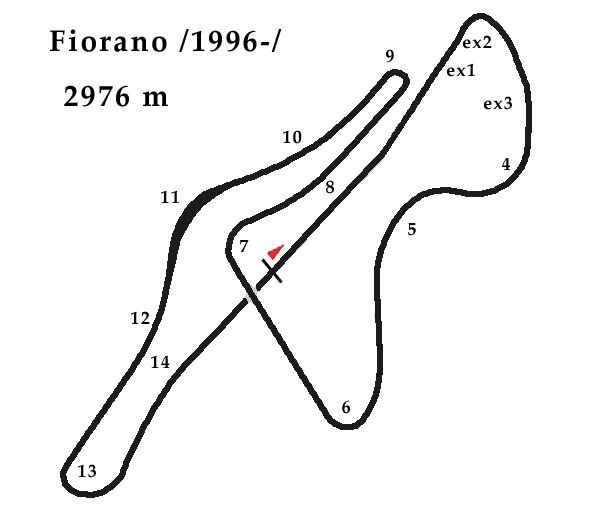
- Full Circuit (1996–present)
- Location: Fiorano Modenese, Italy
- Coordinates: 44°32′2″N 10°51′29″E
- Capacity: N/A (not open to public)
- FIA Grade: 2 (Note: Fiorano Circuit's Grade 2 license expired on 5 October 2026.)
- Broke ground: 1971; 55 years ago
- Opened: 8 April 1972; 54 years ago
- Website: https://www.fioranoturismo.it/it/motori/pista-di-fiorano

Full Circuit (1996–present)
- Length: 2.976 km (1.849 mi)
- Turns: 12
- Race lap record: 0:55.999 ( (Germany) Michael Schumacher, Ferrari F2004, 2004, F1)

Full Circuit with Chicane (1996–present)
- Length: 2.997 km (1.862 mi)
- Turns: 14

Original Circuit with Chicane (1992–present)
- Length: 3.021 km (1.877 mi)
- Turns: 16

Original Circuit (1972–present)
- Length: 3.000 km (1.864 mi)
- Turns: 14

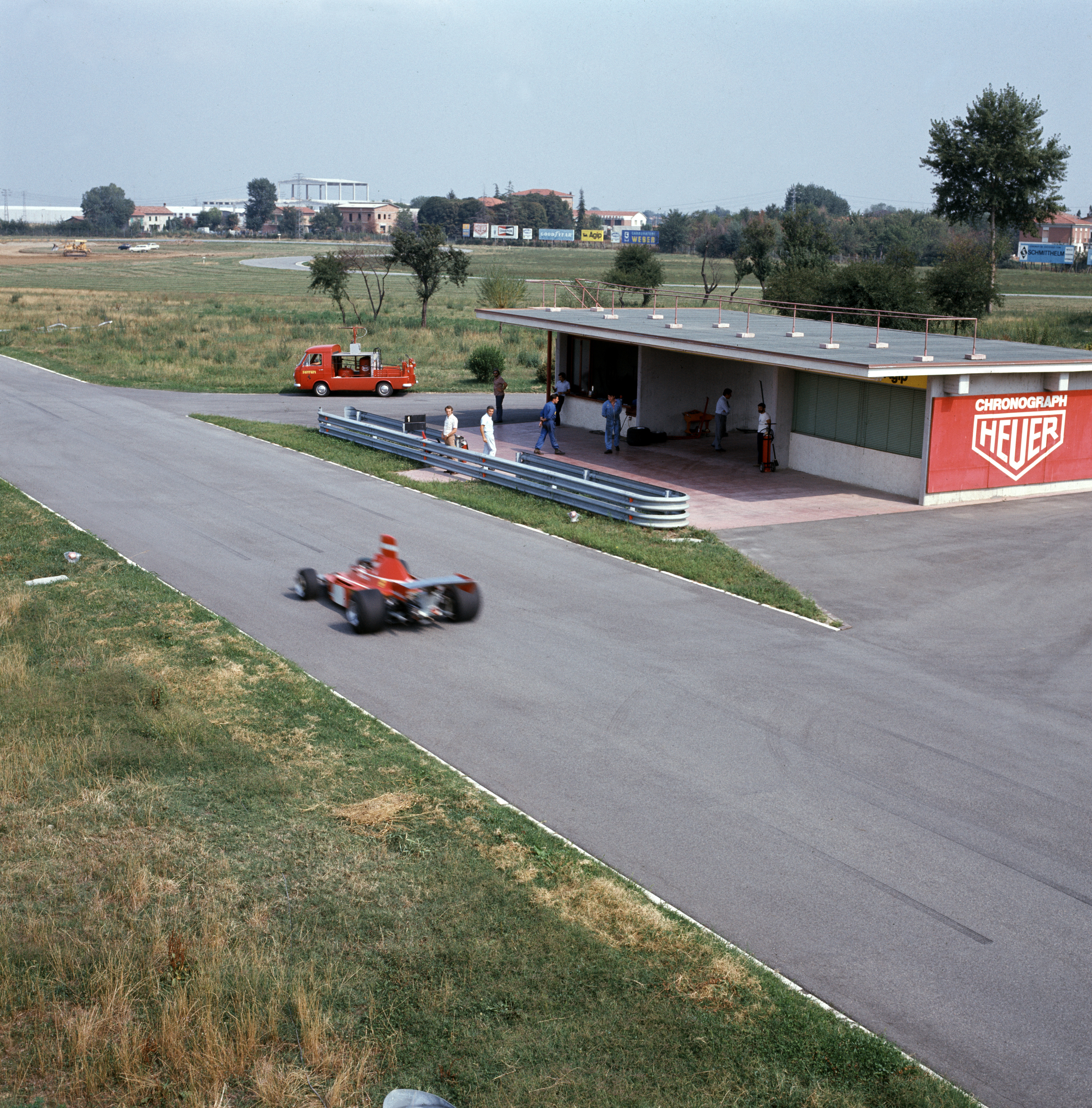
A Ferrari 312B3-74, seen during testing at Fiorano in 1974.

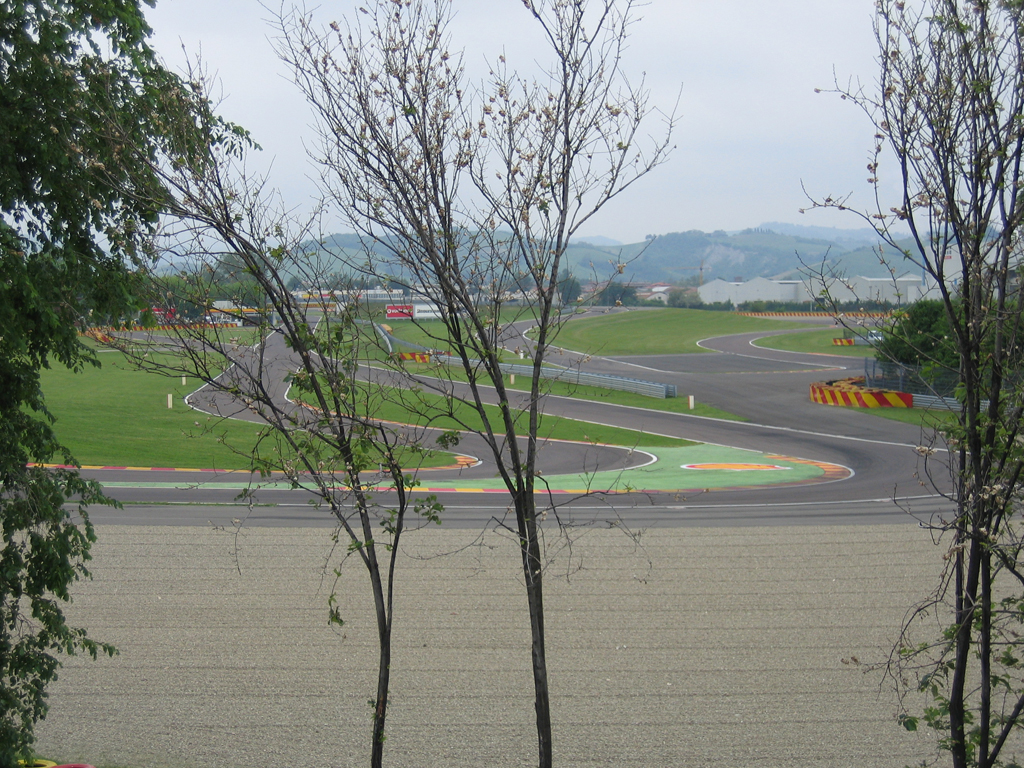
Turn 12 (and 6 to the right) of the Full Circuit as seen from the roadside.

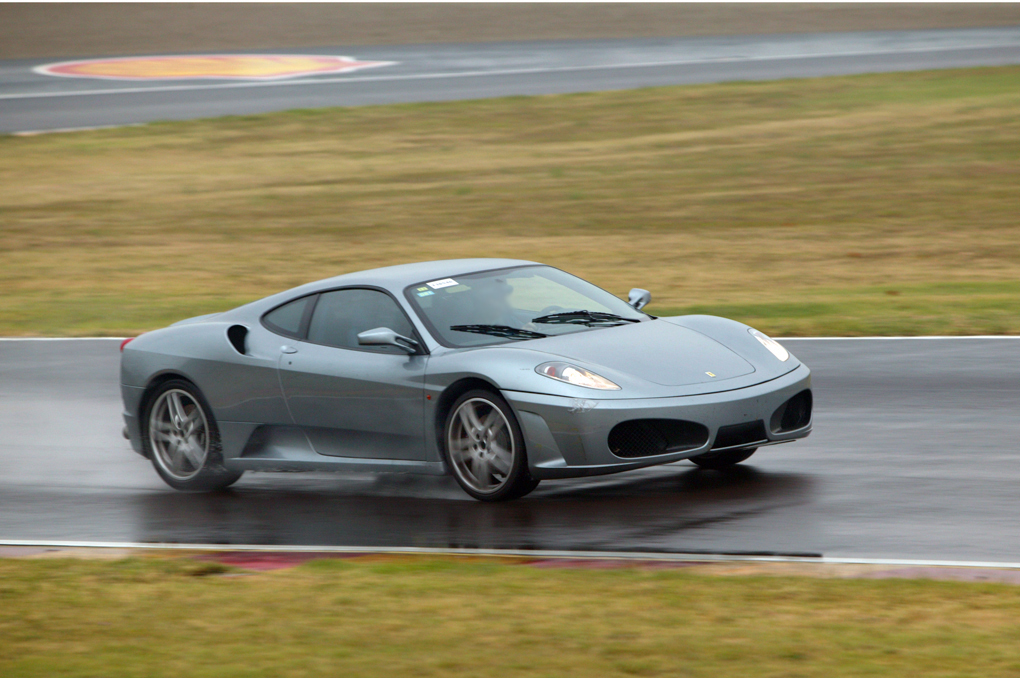
A Ferrari F430 in test.

The Fiorano Circuit (Italian: Pista di Fiorano) is a private racetrack owned by Ferrari for development and testing purposes. It is located in Fiorano Modenese, near the Italian town of Maranello.

Construction began in 1971 and the circuit officially opened on 8 April 1972. It was originally 8.4 m (28 ft) wide and 3.000 km (1.864 mi) long. In 1992, a chicane was added, making it 3.021 km (1.877 mi) long. In 1996, a fast bend replaced a sharp corner at the end of the pit straight, which shortened the length to 3.000 to 2.976 km (1.864 to 1.849 mi) and 3.021 to 2.997 km (1.877 to 1.862 mi) respectively. Fiorano has a wide range of corner types, with corner diameters between 370 and 13.71 m (1,213.9 and 45.0 ft). Thus, Ferrari is able to simulate corner and track types of other Grand Prix circuits. As with Suzuka, it is a figure-of-eight course.

The track is equipped with telemetry sensors and a large skidpad for tyre testing. In 2001 an irrigation system using rain collected in eight cisterns was installed to simulate wet track conditions. When Scuderia Ferrari are testing a F1 car at the track, it is common to see Tifosi watching the test from the roadside, which is the closest point from which the track is viewable to the public.

Ferrari customers are allowed to test drive new cars at the Fiorano circuit. The Ferrari 599 GTB Fiorano is named after this track, as is the Assetto Fiorano track package of the Ferrari SF90 Stradale and the Ferrari 296 GTB.

In the 16 years from the time the track opened until his death in 1988, Enzo Ferrari would either sit in his house which was located at the circuit and listen to, or sit track side and watch his team's Formula One cars testing. Rumours that became legend have said that this was the main reason the "Old Man" had the circuit built in the first place, so that he could hear his beloved Ferrari racing cars in full cry without having the other cars and engines in the race hindering the sound. Though in truth he had decided to build a dedicated test circuit when he considered that the Aerautodromo di Modena could no longer serve this purpose.

== Layout history ==
Fiorano Circuit layout history
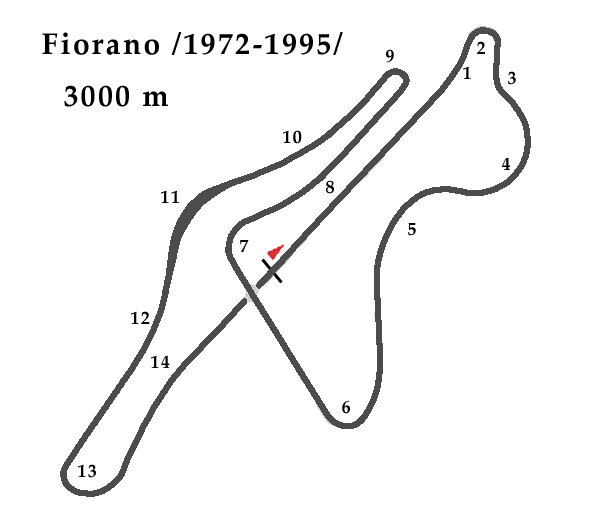
Original Circuit (1972–present)

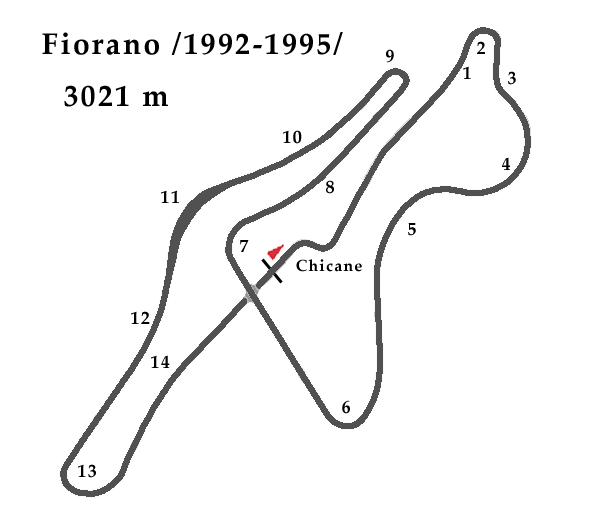
Original Circuit with Chicane (1992–present)

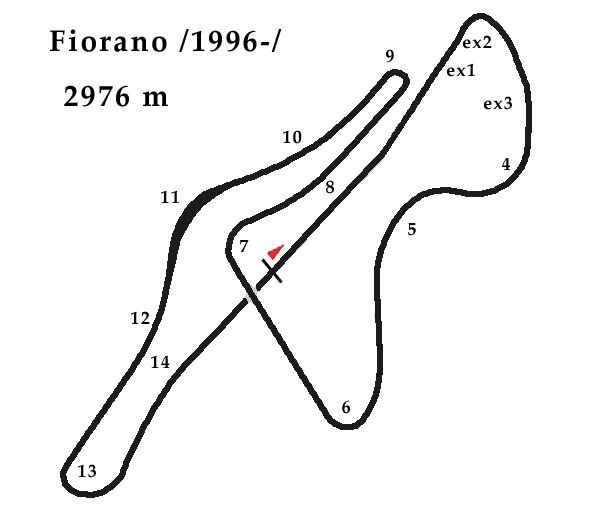
Full Circuit (1996–present)

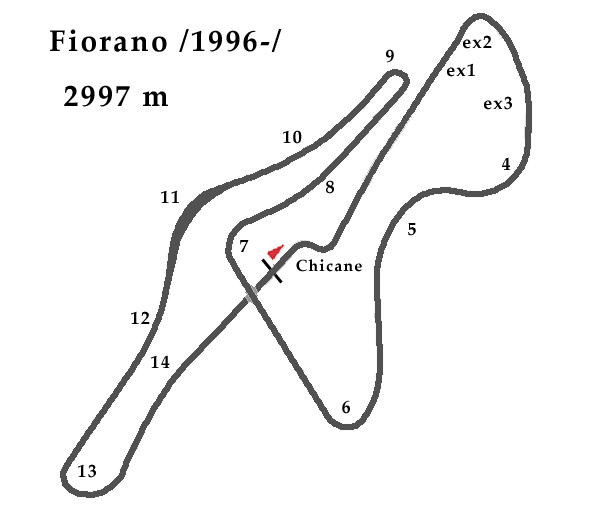
Full Circuit with Chicane (1992–present)

== Record lap times ==
Car	Record	Driver	Year	Note
Formula One cars
Ferrari F2004	0'55.999	(Germany) Michael Schumacher	2004	
Ferrari SF-25	0'56.06	(Monaco) Charles Leclerc	2025	
Ferrari F2003-GA	0'56.33	(Germany) Michael Schumacher	2003	
Ferrari SF-24	0'56.88	(Monaco) Charles Leclerc	2024	
Ferrari 248 F1	0'57.099	(Brazil) Felipe Massa	2006	
Ferrari F2005	0'57.146	(Germany) Michael Schumacher	2005	
Ferrari SF70H	0'57.15	(Finland) Kimi Räikkönen	2017	
Ferrari F2002	0'57.476	(Germany) Michael Schumacher	2002	
Ferrari F2007	0'58.366	(Brazil) Felipe Massa	2007	
Sauber C32	0'58.802	(Colombia) Tatiana Calderón	2018	
Ferrari F310B	0'59.00	(Germany) Michael Schumacher	1997	
Ferrari F2008	0'59.111	(Italy) Mirko Bortolotti	2008	
Ferrari F60	1'00.213	(France) Jules Bianchi	2011	
Ferrari F399	1'00.226	(Italy) Luca Badoer	1999	
Ferrari 412T	1'00.31	(France) Jean Alesi	1994	
Ferrari F60	1'00.650	(Mexico) Sergio Pérez	2011	
Race cars
Ferrari 499p Modificata	1'09.720	(United States) Benjamin Sloss	2024	
Ferrari 296 GT Modificata	1'11.000	(Italy) Ferrari Test Driver	2026	
Maserati MC12 Competizione	1'11.711	(Italy) Andrea Bertolini		Slicks
Ferrari 333 SP	1'11.90			
Ferrari 333 SP	1'13.00			Slicks, air restrictors
Ferrari FXX-K	1'14.00			
Ferrari 599XX Evoluzione	1'15.00		2011	
Ferrari 360 GT2	1'15.00			
Ferrari FXX Evoluzione	1'16.00	(Mexico) Martino Lopez	2007	
Ferrari 599XX	1'16.00		2009	
Ferrari FXX	1'16.20	(Italy) Andrea Bertolini	2008	
Ferrari 458 Challenge	1'16.50		2010	
Ferrari FXX	1'18.00	(Italy) Dario Benuzzi		
Maserati Trofeo	1'21.1		2003	
Ferrari F355 Challenge	1'25.40			Rear wing
Ferrari 348 Challenge	1'33.00			
Road cars
Ferrari F80	1'15.30		2024	
Ferrari SF90 XX	1'17.31	(Italy) Raffaele De Simone	2023	
Ferrari 849 Testarossa	1'17.50		2025	
Ferrari 296 Speciale	1'19.00		2025	
Ferrari SF90 Stradale	1'19.00		2019	
Ferrari LaFerrari	1'19.70	(Italy) Raffaele De Simone	2015	
Ferrari 812 Competizione	1'20.00		2021	
Ferrari 296 GTB	1'21.00		2021	
Ferrari F12TDF	1'21.00		2015	
Ferrari 488 Pista	1'21.50		2018	
Ferrari 488 Pista Spider	1'21.50		2018	
Ferrari 812 Superfast	1'21.50		2017	
Enzo Ferrari	1'22.30		2003	
Ferrari F12 Berlinetta	1'22.40	(United States) Brad Randall	2012	
Ferrari F8 Tributo	1'22.50		2019	
Ferrari 488 GTB	1'23.00		2015	
Ferrari 458 Speciale	1'23.50		2013	Michelin Sport Cup 2
Ferrari 458 Speciale Aperta	1'23.50		2015	
Ferrari 599 GTO	1'24.00		2010	
Enzo Ferrari	1'24.90		2003	
Ferrari 458 Italia	1'25.00		2010	
Ferrari 430 Scuderia	1'25.00		2007	Pirelli P Zero Corsa
Maserati MC12	1'25.20			
Ferrari 599 GTB Fiorano HGTE	1'25.90		2009	
Ferrari 599 GTB Fiorano	1'26.50		2006	
Ferrari 430 Scuderia Spider 16M	1'26.50		2009	
Ferrari F50	1'27.00		1995	
Ferrari F430	1'27.00		2005	
Ferrari 360 Challenge Stradale	1'28.00		2003	Semi-slicks
Ferrari F430	1'28.50		2005	
Ferrari F40	1'29.60		1987	
Ferrari 612 Scaglietti	1'30.50		2004	
Ferrari 360 Modena	1'31.50		1999	
Ferrari 575M Maranello	1'31.512		2002	
Ferrari 550 Maranello	1'32.528		1996	
Ferrari 355 F1	1'33.00		1997	
Ferrari F355	1'34.00		1994	
Ferrari F512 M	1'35.00		1995	
Ferrari 512 TR	1'35.00		1992	
Ferrari 456 GT	1'35.00		1992	
Maserati Coupé	1'35.00			
Ferrari 288 GTO	1'36.00		1984	
Ferrari Testarossa	1'36.00		1984	
Ferrari 348 TB	1'37.00		1989	
Ferrari 328 GTB	1'44.00			
