= Bénassy =

Bénassy is a French surname. Notable people with the surname include:

- Agnès Bénassy-Quéré (born 1966), French economist
- Jean-Pascal Bénassy (1948–2022), French economist

== See also ==
- Benassay
- Benassi
- Benassit
