= Dario Benuzzi =

Italian racing driver

- Nationality: (Italy) Italian
- Born: January 1946 (age 80) Rome, Italy
- Teams: Scuderia Ferrari

Dario Benuzzi (born January 1946) is an Italian test driver, best known for his employment at Ferrari, a manufacturer of sports cars in Italy. He has tested every production model following the Dino road cars as well as the company's Formula One cars. As a chief test driver, he was responsible for its development work that involves spending five to six hours in a car daily at Ferrari's private track of Fiorano and on the road, then giving feedback to his team of test drivers and car engineers.

Originally from the neighbouring Vignola, his career with the factory began in 1971 when as a mechanic, he applied for a job at Ferrari and soon, he began working in its prototype department. He gradually progressed from mechanic to trainee test driver under the auspice of chief test driver Roberto Lippi.

From the late 1980s to 1993, when Nicola Larini stepped in, Benuzzi was the test driver for Ferrari's Formula One cars. Benuzzi was one of the Olympic torch bearers at the Maranello leg for the 2006 Winter Olympics, handing it to fellow test driver, Luca Badoer. Benuzzi was named one of the "Men of the Year 2011" by Top Gear for beating unruly Ferraris into shape for 40 long years. He retired in 2015.
