= Ferrari Ascari =

The Ferrari Ascari is a Ferrari concept car that won the "Ferrari: New Concepts for the Myth" car design competition in 2005. The car was designed by Manuele Amprimo, Werner Gruber, and Yu Jae-Cheul from Istituto Europeo di Design (IED; English: European Institute of Design), Turin, Italy. The judges of the competition included Luca Cordero di Montezemolo, Piero Ferrari (the second and only living son of Enzo Ferrari), Jean Todt, Amedeo Felisa, Massimo Fumarola, Pininfarina, and more than 22,000 users of FerrariWorld's online website. A scale model was made for the competition. As a result of this competition, the Ferrari Ascari, has a larger chance of evolving from concept car to reality.
