= Elisabetta Benassi =

Italian artist

- Born: 1966 (age 59–60); Rome, Italy
- Education: Accademia di Belle Arti di Roma
- Known for: Installation art; Video art; Conceptual art; Photography
- Notable work: The Dry Salvages (2013); The Innocent Abroad (2011); They Live We Sleep (2008)
- Movement: Conceptual art
- Website: www.elisabettabenassi.com

Elisabetta Benassi (born 1966 in Rome) is a contemporary Italian artist. She is aligned with the conceptual tradition, employing a plurality of media and techniques that reference artistic traditions of the twentieth century, her personal history, as well as broader political and cultural themes, including psychoanalysis and cultural memory. What emerges in her oeuvre is a critical examination of contemporary identity and the conditions of modernity.

As well as incorporating concepts on modernity in her work, Benassi has explored the use of mixed media, machinery, and sculpture. In her work, Suolo No. 3 (Ground #3), Benassi has photographed the ground of an auto repair shop which contains all sorts of metal objects on the floor. The photograph can easily be mistaken for a bunch of dirt. In fact, Benassi has combined these two contrasting conceptual ideas to show cohesion between the objects, exemplifying a balance between them even though they are so different. (Metal: shiny, silver objects juxtaposed with dirt: earth tones, soft). These photographs are large scale, forcing the viewer to face the assorted objects head on.

Benassi lives and works in Rome, Italy, and she is currently represented by Magazzino d'Arte Moderna in Rome and Jousse Enterprise in Paris.
