= Mario Benazzi =

Italian zoologist (1902–1997)

Mario Benazzi (Cento, August 29, 1902 – Pisa, December 6, 1997) was an Italian zoologist, professor at the Istituto di Zoologia e Anatomia Comparata of the University of Pisa. He published work on platyhelminths and evolutionary cytogenetics.

Benazzi is honoured in the polychaete name Diurodrilus benazzii Gerlach, 1952 and in the copepod name Colobomatus benazzii Delamare Deboutteville & Nunes Ruivo, 1958. In 1971, he was elected a national member of the Accademia dei Lincei.
