= Ferrari 849 Testarossa =

Sports car

Overview
- Manufacturer: Ferrari
- Production: 2026-present
- Assembly: Italy: Maranello
- Designer: Ferrari Styling Centre under Flavio Manzoni

Body and chassis
- Class: Sports car (S)
- Body style: 2-door berlinetta 2-door retractable hard-top convertible
- Layout: Longitudinal mid-engine, all-wheel-drive

Powertrain
- Engine: 4.0 L (3,990 cc) F154 FC twin-turbocharged V8
- Power output: Engine: 610 kW (830 PS; 819 hp); Electric motors: 162 kW (220 PS; 217 hp); Combined: 772 kW (1,050 PS; 1,036 hp)
- Transmission: 8-speed Magna 8DCL900 dual-clutch
- Hybrid drivetrain: PHEV
- Battery: 7.45 kWh lithium-ion
- Range: 26 km (16 miles)

Dimensions
- Wheelbase: 2,650 mm (104.3 in)
- Length: 4,718 mm (185.7 in)
- Width: 2,304 mm (90.7 in)
- Height: 1,225 mm (48.2 in)

Chronology
- Predecessor: Ferrari SF90 Stradale

The Ferrari 849 Testarossa (Type F173M) is a mid-engine sports car built by Italian manufacturer Ferrari. Containing a plug-in hybrid V8 powertrain, it is a successor to the Ferrari SF90 Stradale, and it takes its name from the 1950s and 1960s Ferrari racecars, such as the 250 Testarossa. According to Ferrari, the 8 of the "849" part of its name comes from its eight cylinders, and the 49 comes from the displacement of each cylinder in cubic centimeters.

Rear View

The car was unveiled to the public on September 9, 2025 and it entered production in the middle of 2026.

== Design ==
The car's design recalls the new Ferrari styling elements introduced in the Ferrari F80, itself being partly inspired by the older Ferrari Daytona.

According to Ferrari, a major part of the car's design, especially in the rear end, was inspired by the manufacturer's 1970s endurance prototypes, more specifically by the 1970 Ferrari 512S.

== Variants ==
=== Spider ===
Aside from the baseline coupé, Ferrari is also offering a convertible variant called the 849 Testarossa Spider.

849 Testarossa Spider

Interior

=== Assetto Fiorano ===
A performance package available for both the coupé and spider variants. It features two smaller wings like the Ferrari FXX-K and Ferrari claims it to be 30 kg (66 lb) lighter than the standard version.

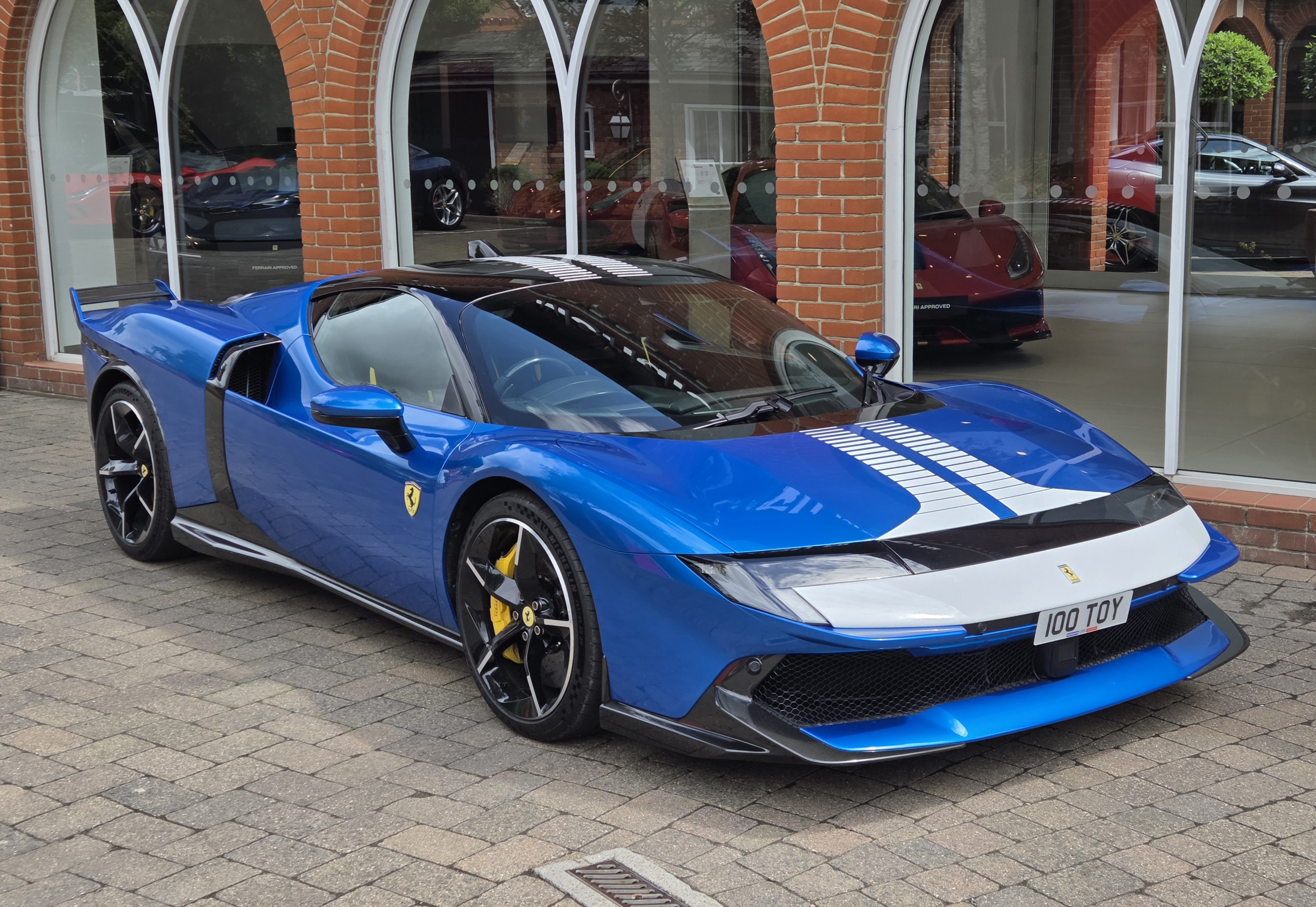
849 Testarossa Assetto Fiorano

== Production ==
Ferrari states that the production of the 849 Testarossa began in the middle of 2026.
