= Ferrari F80 =

Hybrid sports car

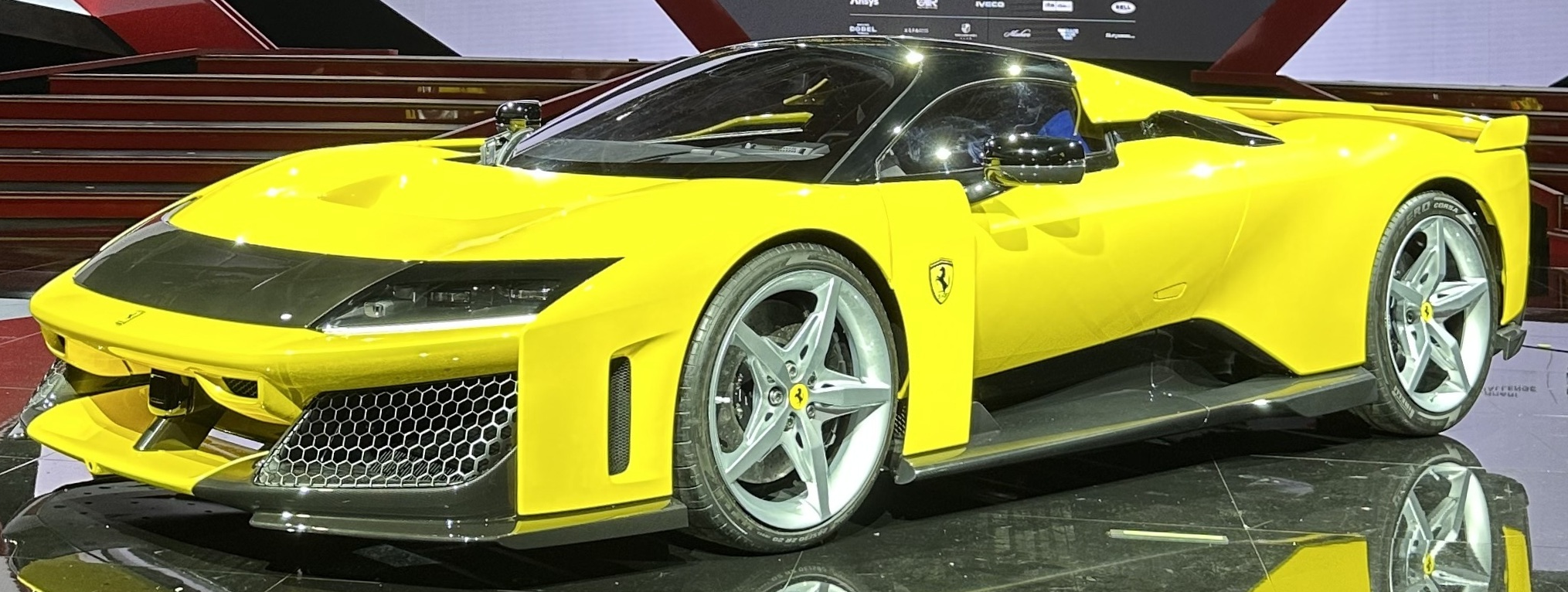

Overview
- Manufacturer: Ferrari
- Production: 2025–present (799 units planned)
- Assembly: Italy: Maranello
- Designer: Ferrari Styling Centre under Flavio Manzoni

Body and chassis
- Class: Sports car (S)
- Body style: 2-door coupé
- Layout: Rear mid-engine, all-wheel-drive
- Doors: Butterfly
- Related: Ferrari 499P

Powertrain
- Engine: 2,992 cc (182.6 cu in) F163 CF 120° twin-turbo V6
- Electric motor: Two front, litz wire wound, radial flux motors and one rear litz wire wound starter/hybrid motor; developed in-house
- Power output: Engine: 900 PS (662 kW; 888 hp); Electric motors: 300 PS (221 kW; 296 hp); Combined: 1,200 PS (883 kW; 1,184 hp)
- Transmission: 8-speed Magna 8DCL900 dual-clutch
- Hybrid drivetrain: Mid-Engine with Electronic All-Wheel Drive
- Battery: 2.28 kWh 800-Volt Li-ion

Dimensions
- Wheelbase: 2,665 mm (104.9 in)
- Length: 4,840 mm (190.6 in)
- Width: 2,065 mm (81.3 in)
- Height: 1,138 mm (44.8 in)
- Curb weight: 1,525 kg (3,362 lb) (dry)

Chronology
- Predecessor: LaFerrari

The Ferrari F80 (Type F250) is a limited production mid-engine, hybrid sports car built by the Italian automobile manufacturer Ferrari. Designed and named to commemorate the 80th anniversary of the company, it serves as Ferrari's flagship vehicle, and a successor to LaFerrari.

The Ferrari F80 was revealed on 17 October 2024 at an event with production starting in 2025.

== Design ==
The design of the F80 was inspired by the F40, which commemorated Ferrari's 40th anniversary, and the Ferrari Daytona SP3. Certain styling elements, specifically the black band on the bonnet, were inspired by the Ferrari 365 GTB/4 Daytona, similar to the Ferrari 12Cilindri.

== Specifications ==
=== Engine and transmission ===
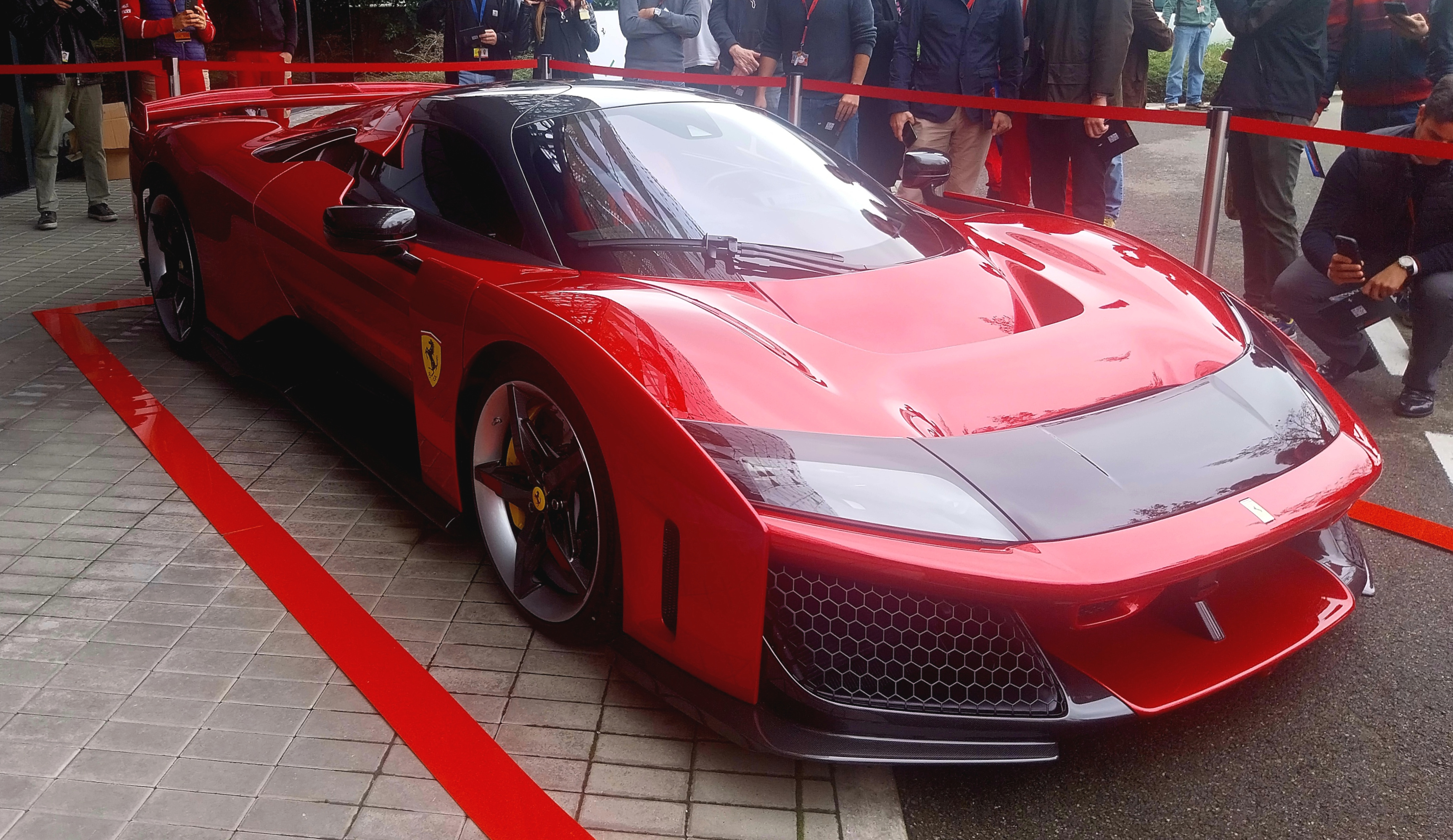
Ferrari F80 on display at the Ferrari factory in Maranello (in front of the Centro Stile)

The F80 uses a hybrid powertrain, consisting of the 3.0L twin-turbocharged Tipo F163 CF 120° V6 petrol engine derived from the Ferrari 499P Le Mans Hypercar, and three electric motors. The engine produces 900 PS (662 kW; 888 hp), while the electric motors produce 300 PS (221 kW; 296 hp). The resultant specific output of the 2992cc engine individually is 296 hp/l, achieved in part via 3.7 bar (55.5 psi) of boost from the turbochargers. Motor Trend claimed both figures were the highest of any production car to date. Combined, the powerplants produce a total of 1,200 PS (883 kW; 1,184 hp).

=== Performance ===
The car has a stated top speed of 350 km/h (217 mph). It can accelerate from 0 to 100 km/h (0 to 62 mph) in 2.15 seconds and from 0 to 200 km/h (0 to 124 mph) in 5.75 seconds. According to Ferrari, the vehicle generates over a ton of downforce, producing 1,050 kg at speed. The car holds the fastest lap time for a road-legal Ferrari at the Fiorano test track, completing a lap in 1:15.30.

== Production ==
Ferrari stated that production began in 2025 and was expected to end in 2027. Only 799 units were to be built, all of which had already been reserved by customers, with each priced at approximately US$3.9 million (€3.6 million).

== Variants ==
=== Rosso Supercar (2026) ===
On 24 April 2026, the Ferrari F80 was seen in Monaco with a Rosso Supercar livery, without the black stripe on the bonnet and without the black roof, unlike the version officially unveiled in 2025. This Ferrari is probably a tailor-made Ferrari and has been seen with a Monaco license plate number 711F. The car was collected by the owner from the official Ferrari dealer Scuderia Monte-Carlo.
