= Ferrari 308 =

Ferrari 308 refers to a 3.0-liter 8-cylinder Ferrari sports car, of which there were three different models:

- Ferrari GT4, a Bertone-styled 2+2 V8 successor to the Dino
- Ferrari 308 GTB/GTS, a Pininfarina-styled 2-seat version of the GT4
- Ferrari 308 GT/M, a prototype racing car intended to compete in Group B rally racing.
