= Ferrari 328 =

Ferrari 328 GTB & GTS
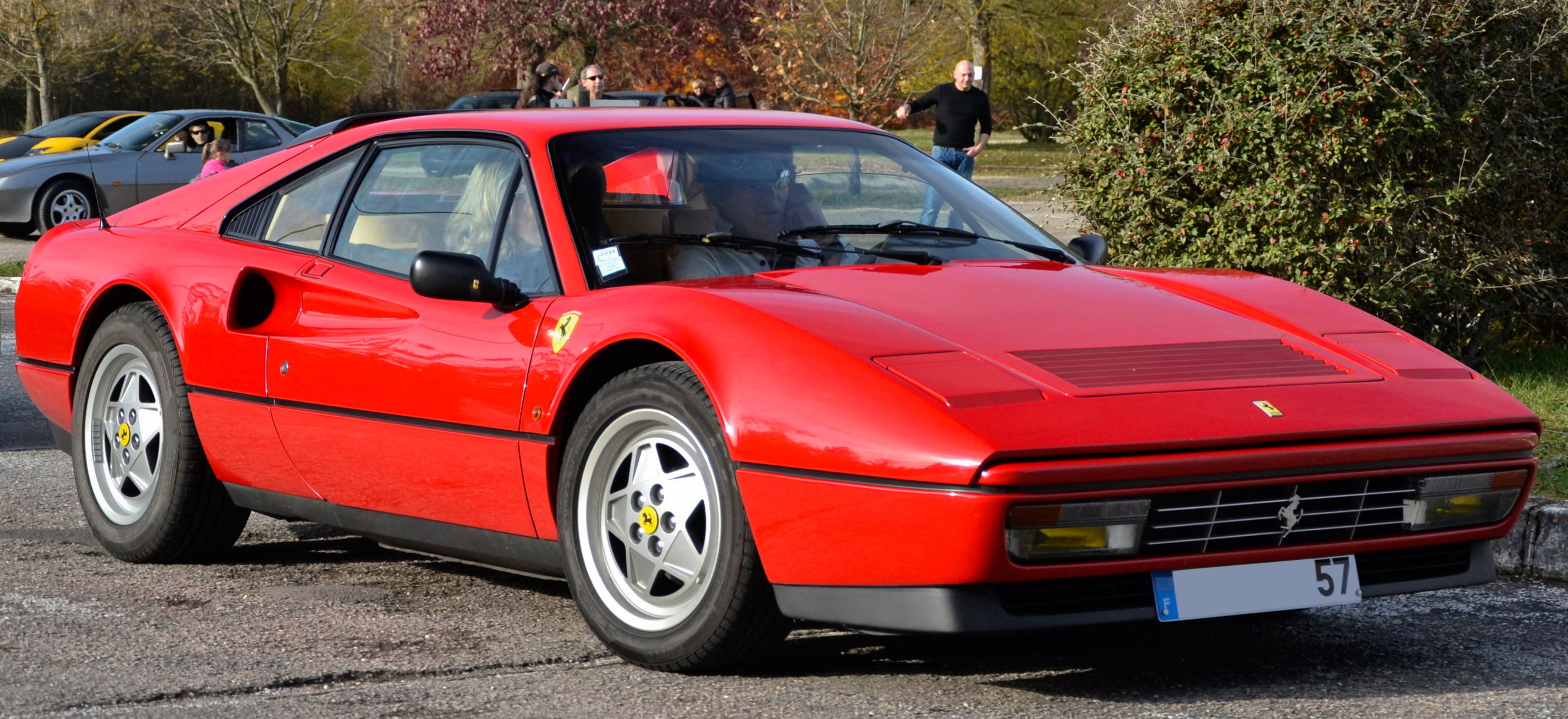

Overview
- Manufacturer: Ferrari
- Production: 1985–1989; 7,412 produced
- Model years: 1986–1989
- Assembly: Italy: Maranello
- Designer: Leonardo Fioravanti at Pininfarina

Body and chassis
- Class: Sports car (S)
- Body style: Berlinetta (GTB); Spider / targa (GTS)
- Layout: Transverse, rear mid-engine, rear-wheel-drive
- Related: Ferrari 3.2 Mondial

Powertrain
- Engine: 3.2 L Tipo F105CB V8
- Transmission: 5-speed manual

Dimensions
- Wheelbase: 2,350 mm (92.5 in)
- Length: 4,255 mm (167.5 in)
- Width: 1,730 mm (68.1 in)
- Height: 1,128 mm (44.4 in)
- Curb weight: 1,263 kg (2,784 lb)

Chronology
- Predecessor: Ferrari 308 QV
- Successor: Ferrari 348

The Ferrari 328 GTB and GTS (Type F106) are mid-engine V8, two-seat sports cars created by Italian automobile manufacturer Ferrari. It was the successor to the Ferrari 308 GTB and GTS. While mechanically still based on the 308, modifications were made to the body, chassis, and engine, most notably an increase in engine displacement to 3.2 L for increased power and torque output. The 328 is still considered by some enthusiasts to be one of the most reliable and functional Ferraris; unlike other models, much of its maintenance can be performed without lowering the engine from the vehicle. In 1989, the 328 was succeeded by the 348.

"GTB" refers to the Gran Turismo Berlinetta (coupé) (fixed roof) body, while "GTS" signifies a Gran Turismo Spider (targa top).

The "328" numbers in the model title referred to the total cubic capacity of the engine, 3.2 litres, and 8 for the number of cylinders. The new model was introduced at the 1985 Frankfurt Salon alongside the Mondial 3.2 series.

== Overview ==
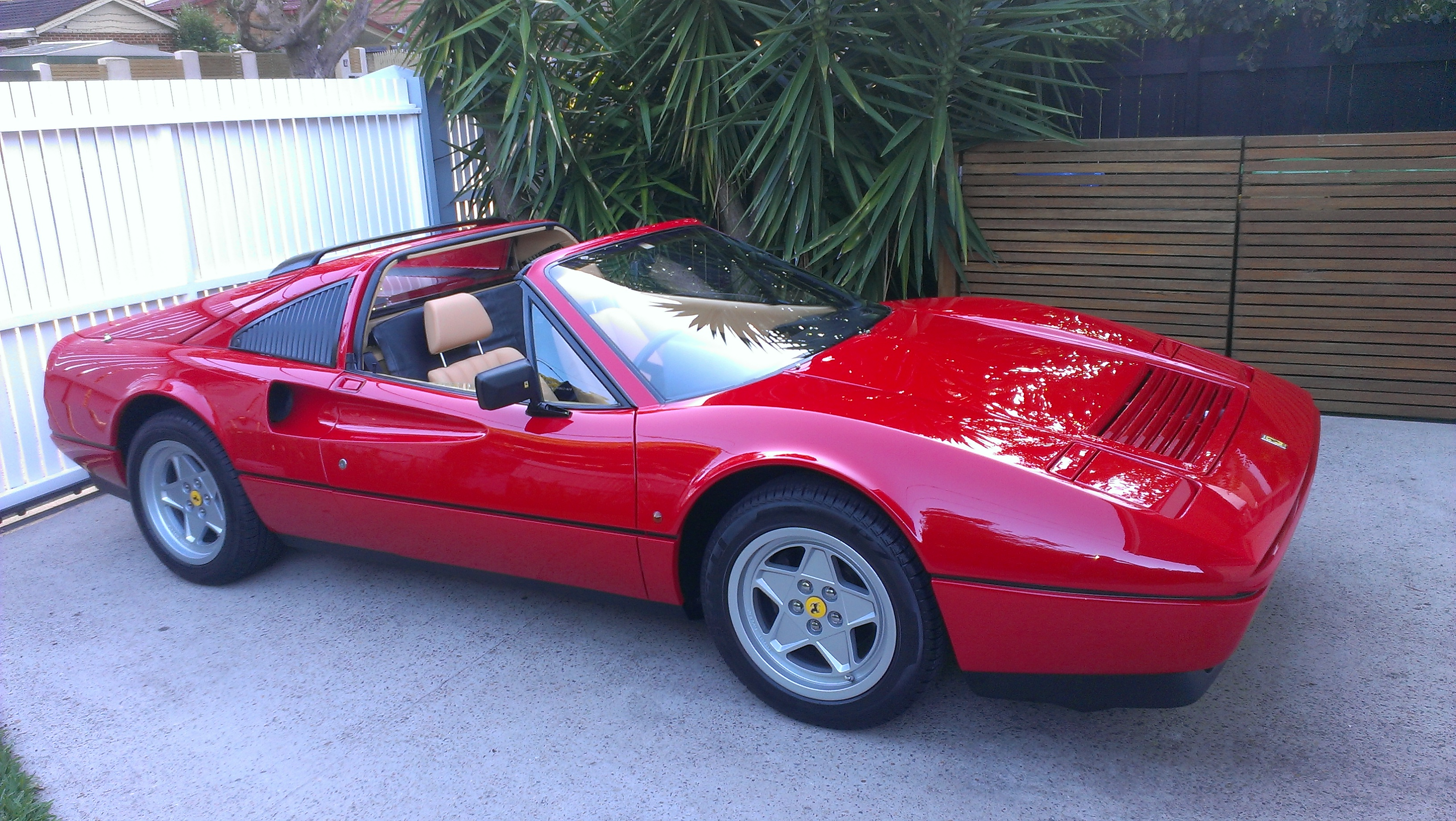
1987 328 GTS, with original concave wheel design.

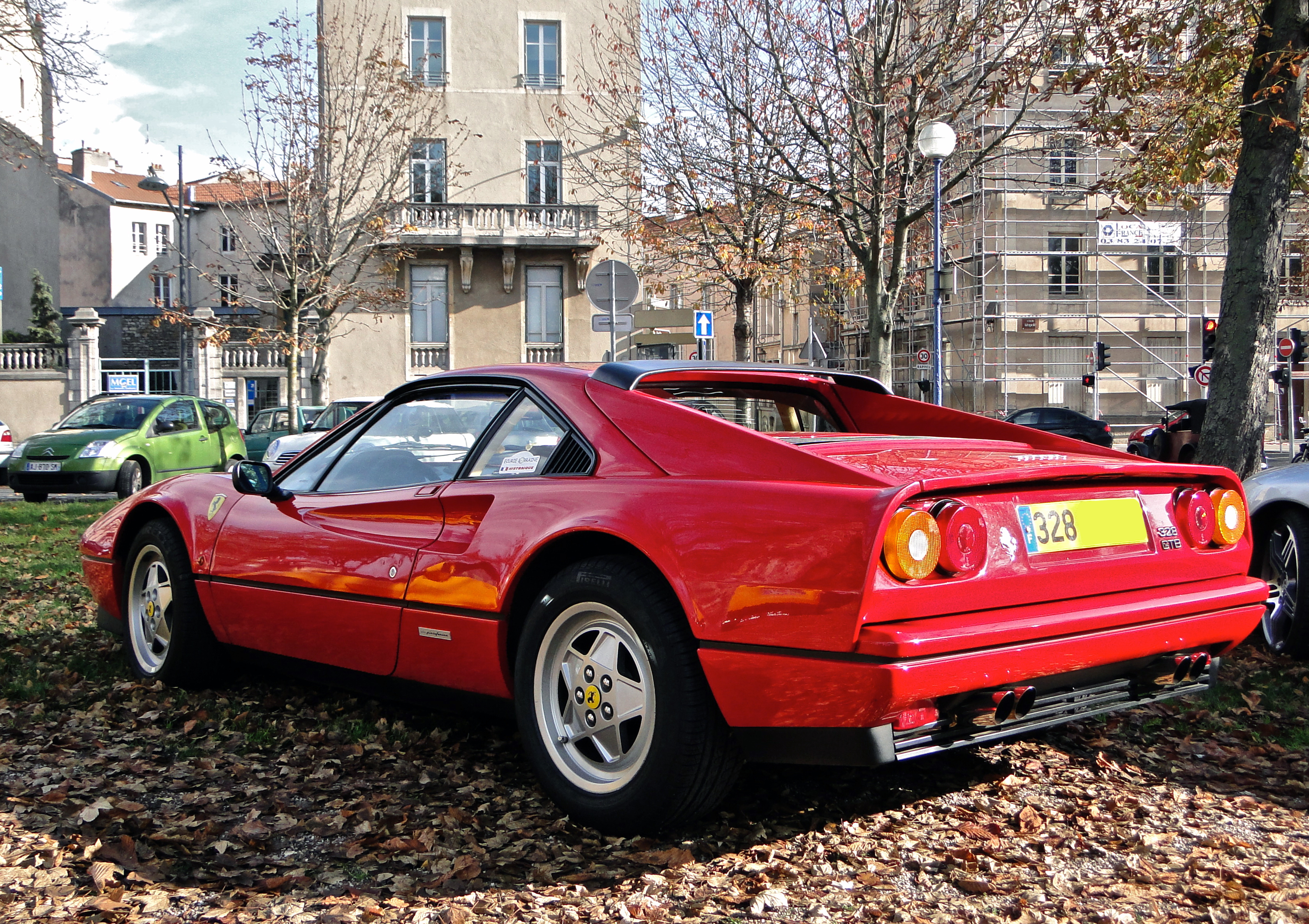
1989 328 GTB, equipped with ABS and convex wheel design.

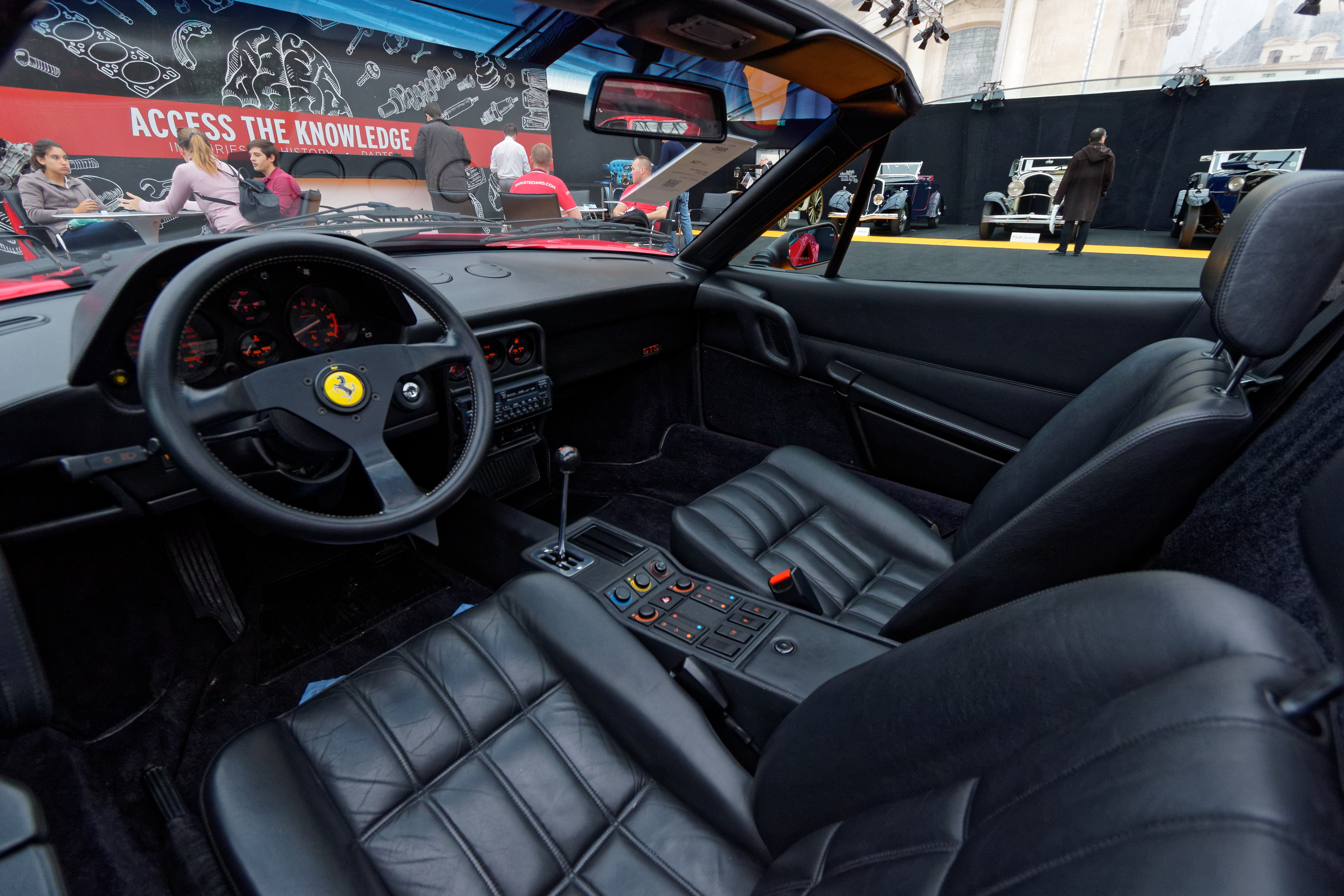
1988 328 GTS interior

The 308 and 328 are considered a family of Ferrari road cars, as they share similar (but not identical) body and appearance designs, chassis designs, and engine designs. Essentially, the new 328 was a revised version of the 308, which had survived for eight years without any radical change to the overall shape, albeit with various changes to the 3-litre engine.

The 328 was the final evolution of the transversely mid-mounted, conventionally aspirated 90 degree V8 Dino engine. The transversely mounted engine is a popular way to save space on the rear-mid, rear wheel drive layout.

For its durable road record and classical aesthetics, the 328 has been described as one of the "most usable" classic Ferraris.

=== Design ===
The original Pininfarina design was carried over from its predecessor but included subtle changes from the carrozzeria. The effect was both aesthetic and an improvement in overall aerodynamic characteristics. The car's body was still largely built by hand coming from the coachbuilder Scaglietti works.

The revised body presented a softening of the wedge profile of its predecessor, with a redesigned nose that had a more rounded shape, which was complemented by similar treatment to the tail valance panel. The revised nose and tail sections featured body colour bumpers integral with the valance panels, which reflected the work done concurrently with the Mondial 3.2 models, with which they also shared a similar radiator grille and front light assembly layout. Thus all the eight-cylinder cars in the range shared fairly unified front and rear aspects, providing a homogeneous family image. The exhaust air louvres behind the retractable headlight pods on the 308 series disappeared, coupled with an increase in the size of the front lid radiator exhaust air louvre, which had been introduced on the 308 Quattrovalvole models. A new style and position of exterior door catch was also provided.

The interior trim also received a thorough overhaul, with new designs for the seat panel upholstery and stitching along with revised door panels and pulls. Cockpit switches were completely updated and modernized. The new back lit orange on black dashboard gauges were borrowed from Ferrari's 1984 GTO supercar. The main instrument panel, seen through the anatomical Momo (Morreti-Monza) steering wheel, presented the driver with information from the large tachometer and speedometer.

Optional equipment available was air conditioning, a leather dashboard, leather headlining to the removable roof panel plus rear window surround, metallic paint, Pirelli P7 tyres, and a rear aerofoil (standard on some market models).

One minor problem was the design of the oil hose from the lower part of the engine to the oil cooler. This proved to be too short. The hose, being under constant pressure along with the motion of the running engine, would eventually separate from the oil cooler. The separation would in time cause the oil cooler to crack. One fix was to connect the oil hoses for the oil cooler (to and from the engine) "up side down". This configuration provided more slack for the lower hose (itself now connected to the top of the oil cooler).

=== 1988 Update ===
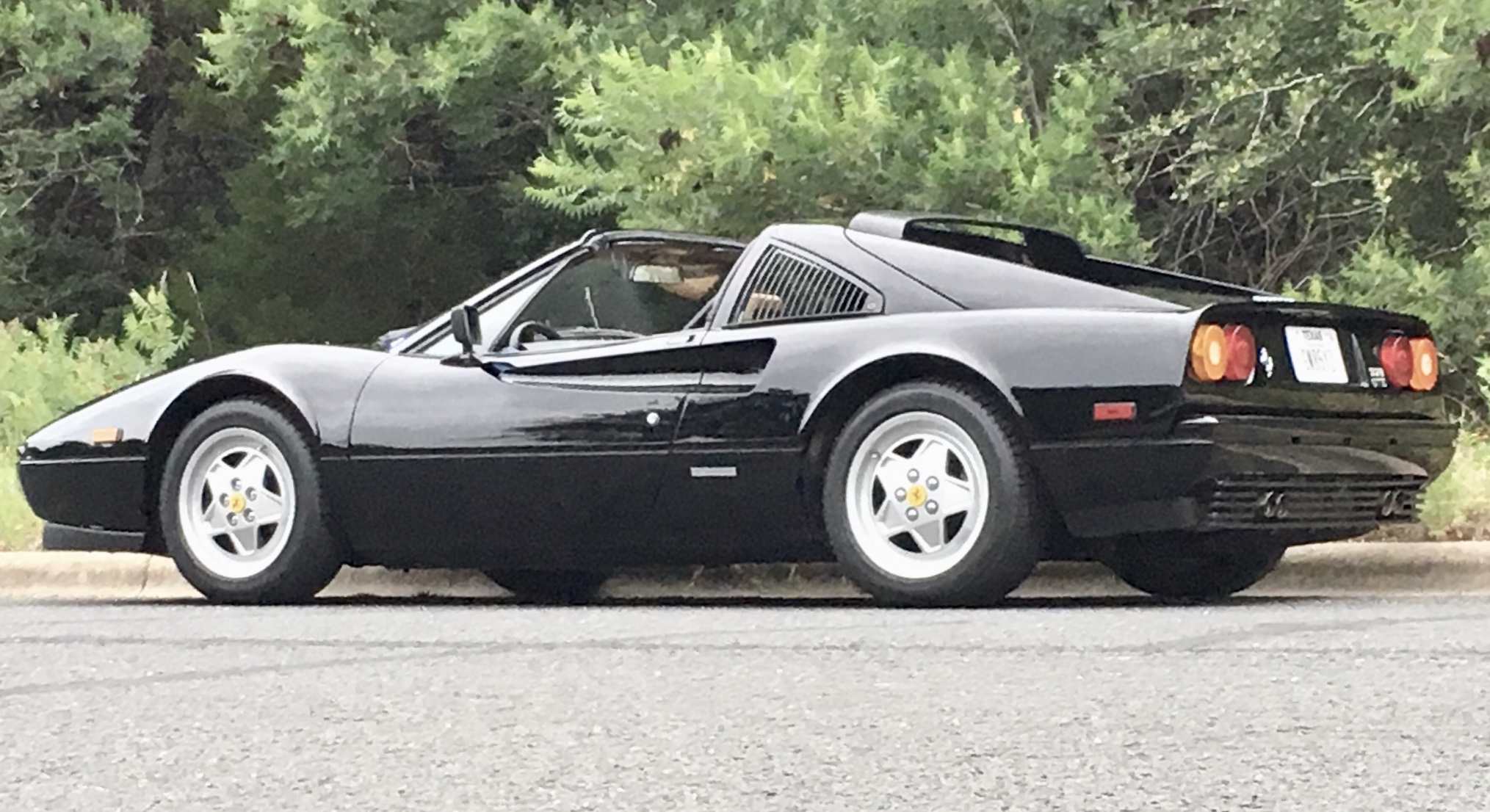
1988.5 update Ferrari 328 GTS

Ferrari gave the 328 its only major mechanical update late in the 1988 model year, an anti-lock braking system (ABS). This necessitated a redesign of the suspension geometry to provide negative offset. The overall upgrade required the incorporation of convex hub 16-inch alloy wheels replacing the previous concave versions. Thus the original flat spoke "star" wheels became a convex design, in the style as fitted to the 3.2 Mondial models. The update began with chassis number 76626 (February 1988) and the improved suspension and convex wheels were used whether the car was fitted with ABS or not. In Europe, ABS was an option for all mid-1988 and 1989 models. In the US, mid-1988 models did not have ABS while all MY 1989's did. The mid-1988 models are often referred to as MY 1988 1/2. The wheel changes are a visual differentiator for the later models. In 1988 and 1989, the side view door mirrors also wore small Cavallino Rampante emblems.

=== Production ===
The 328 model remained in production for four years (1985 to 1989). By the time it was replaced by the 348 in the autumn of 1989, a total of 7,412 vehicles had been made. GTS production totaled 6,068 vehicles in the chassis number range of 59301 to 83136. GTS production outnumbered the GTB version almost five to one. GTB production totaled 1,344 vehicles in the chassis range of 58735 to 83017. The early part of each series were numbered in the Ferrari odd number road car chassis sequence, and later examples (post chassis number 75000) in the continuous number sequence.

=== History ===
The 308/328 family was, at the time, one of the most commercially successful for Ferrari with nearly 20,000 produced.

The very first developmental prototype for the 328 model was manufactured in the summer of 1984. Chassis number 49543 was certified, road-registered and extensively tested through the spring of 1985. Interestingly, the original prototype was manufactured as a full soft top cabriolet convertible.

The story is that while the technical departments were pleased with the performance of the prototype, the marketing influence feared that as a convertible, it would compete with the Mondial Cabriolet model. It was subsequently produced, like its predecessor, only in Berlinetta (GTB - coupe) and removable hard top Spider (GTS - targa) variants. As of 2018, cabriolet chassis number 49543 was still in existence and registered for road use in Italy.

The last production year for the 328 GTB/GTS was September 1988 to Sept/Oct 1989 (model year 1989). 1338 total vehicles were manufactured that year. With Enzo Ferrari's death in August 1988, many of these last cars were purchased either as a tribute or with speculation in mind. Decades later, it is still not unheard of to occasionally find a 328 for sale from the last production year that was never registered for road use. 1,344 GTBs and 6,068 GTSs were produced in total.

== Specifications ==
=== Engine ===
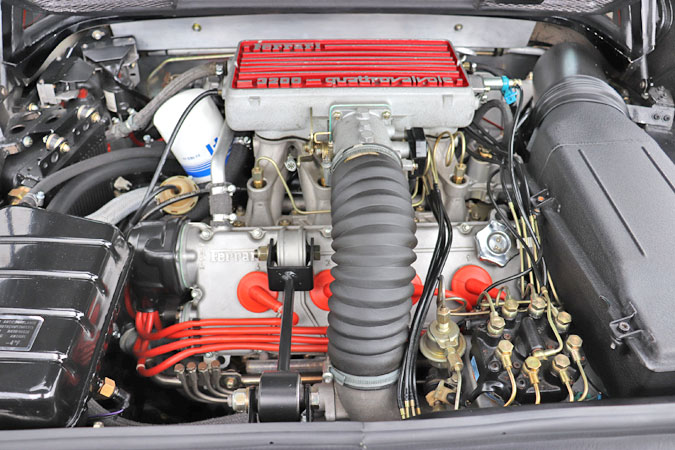
Ferrari 328 Transverse Engine F105CB

The 328 uses the Ferrari Dino engine produced from the late 1950s to the early 2000s. It is a very similar engine design as that used in the 308 Quattrovalvole model. It has a naturally aspirated 3.2-litre (3185 cc), 4-valve-per-cylinder (quattro valvole), transverse mounted, rear mid-engine V8 layout (Tipo F105 CB 000). It has a bore and stroke of 83 mm × 73.6 mm (3.27 in × 2.90 in). The engine retained the Bosch K-Jetronic fuel injection system of its predecessor, but was fitted with a Marelli MED 806 A electronic ignition system. It produces 270 PS (199 kW; 266 hp) and 304 N⋅m (224 lb⋅ft) of torque. Its top speed is 166 mph (267 km/h) and reaches 60 mph (97 km/h) in 5.5 seconds and 100 mph (161 km/h) in 13.0 seconds. As with the preceding 308 models the engine was mounted in unit with the all synchromesh five-speed manual transmission assembly, which was below and to the rear of the engine's wet sump. The manual gear shifter was the traditional Ferrari gated design.

=== Chassis ===
The 328's chassis designation is F106 AS (or AB) / R (or PB). The AS or AB difference is Spider vs. Berlinetta. The R or PB difference is R = before mid-1988; and PB = after mid-1988. The main European market chassis designation is F106 MS (or MB) 100.

The 328's frame is constructed of oval-shaped tubular steel giving it race car rigidity without significant weight penalty. The body is formed largely from steel with an aluminium front hood and a fiberglass sandwiched steel floorpan. The adaption of galvanized steel was a key improvement from previous models which drastically retarded corrosion. The exterior and structural design substantially reduced the cars weight compared to its predecessor.

The front and rear independent suspension is based on the traditional unequal length double wishbone design. It included coil springs and hydraulic telescopic Koni shock absorbers. It featured front and rear anti roll bars. The brakes were large vented discs with twin-piston calipers actuated, as on the 308, by a hydraulic system offering security through redundancy. The anti-lock braking system was a late model addition with updated suspension geometry to further reduce squat and dive. The steering is unassisted rack and pinion slightly quicker than its predecessor at 3.25 turns, lock to lock.

=== Performance ===
For the 328 GTB:

- 0–60 mph 5.5 seconds approx.
- Top speed 166 mph (267 km/h)

For the 328 GTS:

- 0–60 mph 5.9 seconds
- Top speed 163 mph (262 km/h)

== GTB/GTS Turbo ==
Ferrari GTB Turbo
- 1989 Ferrari GTB Turbo

Overview
- Manufacturer: Ferrari
- Production: 1986–1989; 1,136 produced
- Designer: Nicola Materazzi (engine Chief Engineer)

Body and chassis
- Body style: Berlinetta; Targa
- Layout: Transverse rear mid-engine, rear-wheel-drive

Powertrain
- Engine: 2.0 L Tipo F106 N turbocharged V8
- Transmission: 5-speed manual

Dimensions
- Kerb weight: 1,265–1,275 kg (2,789–2,811 lb) (dry)

Chronology
- Predecessor: Ferrari 208 GTB/GTS Turbo
- Successor: None

In 1986, Ferrari launched a two-litre, turbocharged and intercooled variant of the 328, designated simply GTB Turbo and GTS Turbo—replacing the previous 308-based, non-intercooled, Ferrari 208 GTB/GTS Turbo. This version was developed specifically for the domestic Italian market, where cars with a displacement of over 2-litre like the 328 were subject to a 38% value added tax, up from the normal 18%.

The turbocharged Tipo F106 N 000 V8 was evolved from the 208 Turbo's engine, chiefly by adding an intercooler and adopting a new turbocharger. The development of the complete powertrain was carried out by Nicola Materazzi who had extensive experience in turbocharging from the Lancia Stratos GR5, the Ferrari 126C and had been the Chief Engineer for the 288 GTO and GTO Evoluzione (and later the Ferrari F40). Displacement was unchanged, at 1991 cc with a bore and stroke of 66.8 mm × 71 mm (2.6 in × 2.8 in) but the cylinders were coated with Cermetal NC21 to lower the friction; usefully the engine was fitted with a detonation (knock) sensor, able to retard the ignition in case of near catastrophic pre-ignition. There were four overhead camshafts driving two valves per cylinder; Bosch K-Jetronic mechanical fuel injection was carried over from the 208. Whereas 208 Turbos had used a KKK turbocharger, these new 328-based cars used a water-cooled IHI unit running at 1.05 bar (15.2 psi) of boost. Charge air was cooled by a Behr air-to-air intercooler mounted on top of the engine. Output was 254 PS (187 kW; 251 bhp) at 6,500 rpm and 328 N⋅m (242 lb⋅ft) at 4,100 rpm; maximum torque was reached at engine speeds 700 rpm lower than on the 208 Turbo, making the engine more flexible. The change of turbocharger manufacturer and the addition of the intercooler were design decisions taken from Materazzi's experience with the 288 GTO where the IHI turbochargers had proven to give the best transient response. IHI materials and compressor/turbine geometry was then more advanced than that of KKK. The water-cooling of the turbocharger as well as the lower combustion temperatures afforded by the cooler intake air allow the car to be used harder and more reliably. The car could have produced significantly more power but for commercial reasons Ferrari management decided to keep it below the 270 PS of the naturally aspirated 328.

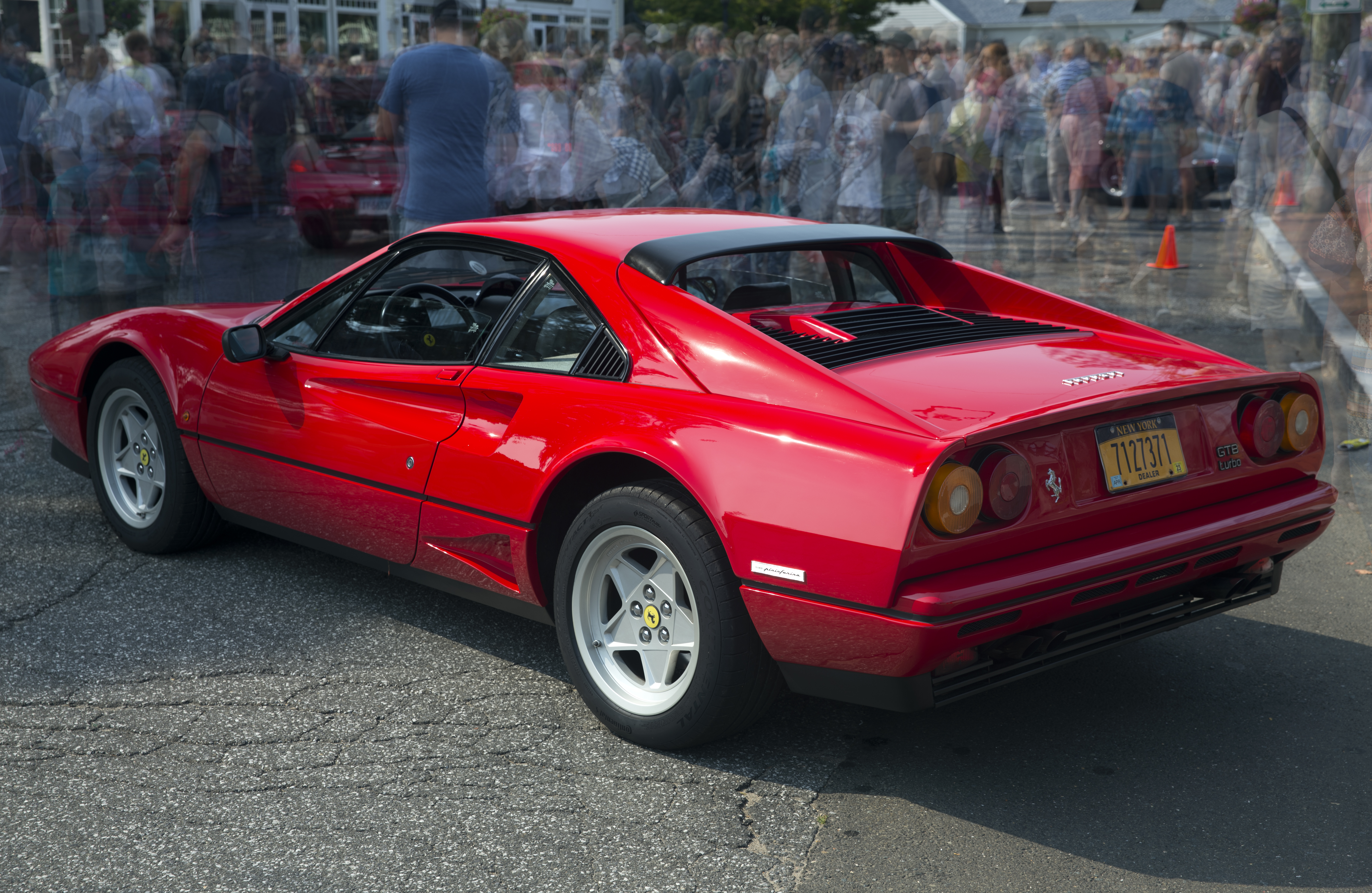
Ferrari GTB Turbo, rear view. Note ventilation slots in rear bumper and NACA duct behind the door.

Other than the engine, differences between the two-litre Turbo and the regular 328 were minimal. Accommodating the top-mounted intercooler required a redesigned engine cover, as well as ducting and NACA intakes (positioned just forwards of each rear wheel arch) to feed it with fresh air. The rear bumper sported five ventilation holes. A black roof spoiler, optional on the 328, was standard; inside a boost pressure gauge was added to the instrument cluster. The gearlever shows numbers in red instead of white colour.

According to the manufacturer top speed was 253 km/h (157 mph) and 0–100 km/h (62 mph) took 6.3 seconds. In June 1986 Italian automobile magazine Quattroruote published a comparison test between a 328 GTS and a GTS Turbo. Despite the differences between the former's more powerful 32-valve atmospheric engine and the latter's torquier but peakier turbocharged 16-valve engine, performance was found to be quite similar in both acceleration and top speed. The Turbo accelerated from 0 to 100 km/h in 6.6 seconds (a tenth of a second behind the 328) and covered the standing kilometre in 24.6 seconds, two tenths behind the 328. Quattroruote recorded a top speed of 251 km/h (156 mph).

During the production period between 1986 and 1989, Ferrari made a total of 308 GTB Turbos and 828 GTS Turbos.
