= Ferrari Mondial =

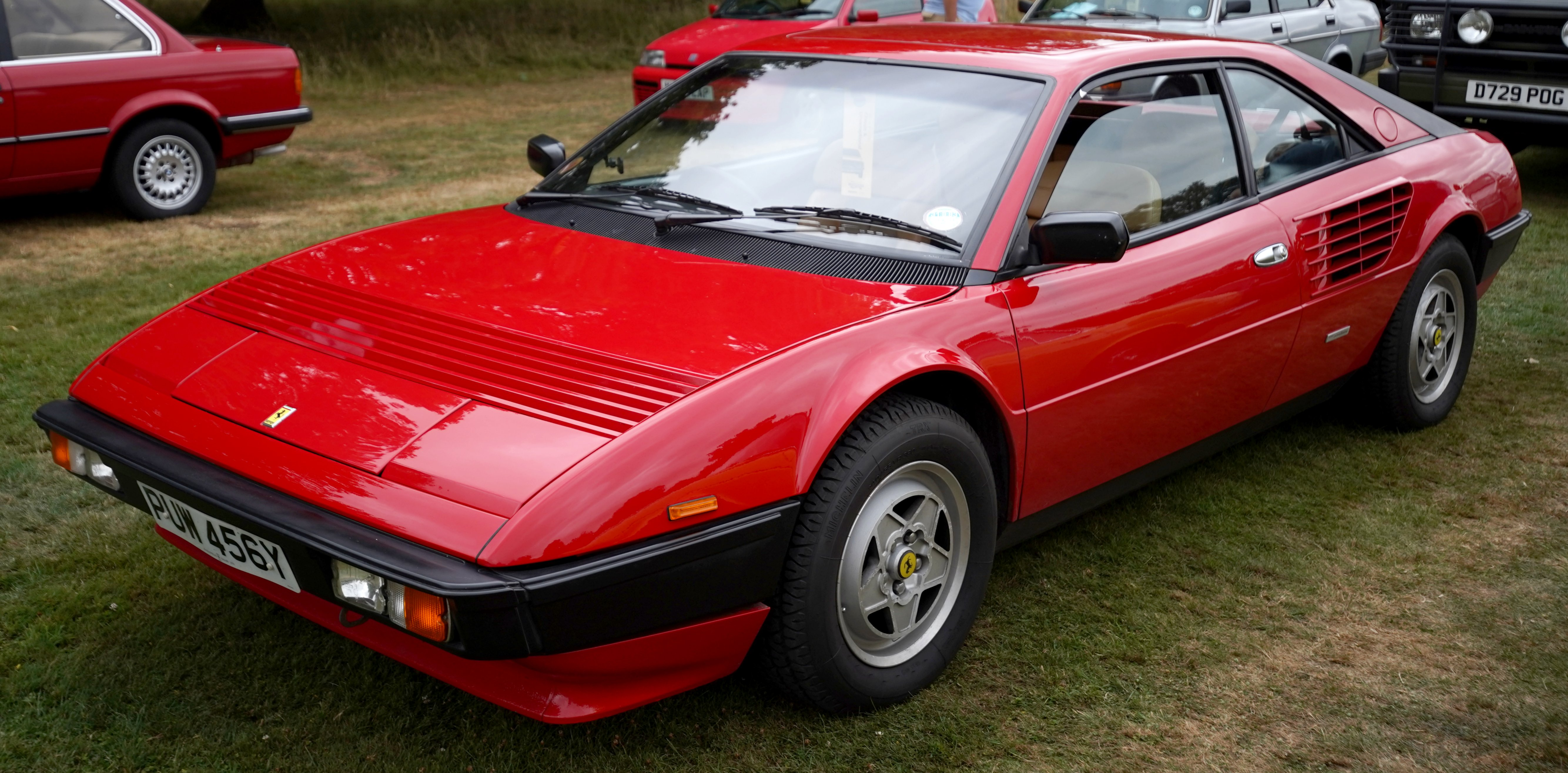

Overview
- Manufacturer: Ferrari
- Production: Mondial 8: 1980–1982; 703 produced; Mondial QV: 1983–1985; Coupé: 1,145 produced; Cabriolet: 629 produced; Mondial 3.2: 1986–1988; Coupé: 987 produced; Cabriolet: 810 produced; Mondial t: 1988–1993; Coupé: 858 produced; Cabriolet: 1,017 produced
- Assembly: Italy: Modena
- Designer: Pininfarina: Pierangelo Andreani (1976); Leonardo Fioravanti

Body and chassis
- Class: Grand tourer
- Body style: 2+2 coupé; 2+2 cabriolet
- Related: Ferrari 308 GTB & GTS; Ferrari 328; Ferrari 348

Chronology
- Predecessor: Ferrari 208/308 GT4

The Ferrari Mondial (Type F108) is a mid-engined, V8, grand tourer manufactured and marketed by Ferrari between 1980 and 1993 – with styling by Pininfarina and bodywork by Carrozzeria Scaglietti.

Offered as either a coupé or cabriolet, the Mondial was intended to be a more luxurious offering compared to the 308 GTSi/GTBi. As a result, it had 2+2 seating, a higher roofline, a longer wheelbase, and an electronic warning-light system.

The Mondial replaced the Ferrari 308/208 GT4 coupé and remains the last V8, rear mid-engined, 2+2 Ferrari.

The name Mondial, Italian for global, was used in the 1950s to celebrate Formula 1 World Championships and again in the 1970s to mark its Formula 1 World Constructors Championships. The name also reflected the car's worldwide conformance with 1980s safety and emission standards.

== Design ==
The Mondial uses a rear mid-engine, in 2+2 2-door coupé or 2+2 convertible bodystyles. It was marketed concurrently with Ferrari's two-seater 308 GTB/GTS, 328, and 348 sports cars, sharing the major mechanical systems with the two-seater model Ferrari marketed concurrently.

Unlike its 308 GT4 predecessor which was styled by the Italian Gruppo Bertone, the original Mondial 8 was designed by Pierangelo Andreani who just started working at Pininfarina with subsequent iterations redesigned by Leonardo Fioravanti, the designer with whom Ferrari had worked closely since 1951.

=== Chassis and body ===
Pininfarina's bodywork was manufactured by coachbuilder Carrozzeria Scaglietti. It used outer body panels fitted to a separate space-frame chassis of tubular box or oval-shaped steel sections. While most body panels are steel, the front lid and rear engine cover of the Mondial 8 and QV models are aluminium. Full-width aluminium louvre panels across the front lid and engine cover provide airflow through the front-mounted radiators and engine bay.

Louvre grilles are located on each side of the vehicle just ahead of the rear wheels providing intake air to the engine on the right and on the left, providing air to an external oil cooler located ahead of the rear wheel arch. Louvres in the front polished aluminium grille provide airflow to the main radiator, supplied with coolant via alloy tubing running through the central chassis spine. A full-width black louvre panel is located below the rear bumper, accommodating an exhaust outlet to each side. Front and rear bumpers are black plastic on the Mondial 8 and QV, while the 3.2 and "t" models use integrated wrap-around glass-fibre panels finished in body colour.

The Mondial chassis features detachable sub-frames holding major mechanical assemblies, including one at the rear supporting the engine/transmission/rear suspension assembly, to simplify engine service compared to previous V8 Ferraris.

A forward-hinged gas-strut-supported lid covers a front compartment accommodating the spare tyre, radiator and cooling fans, battery (ahead of a wheel arch), relay and fuse panel, wiper fluid reservoir, and horn compressor. At the rear, a full-width, insulated and trimmed luggage boot with a gas-strut-supported lid sits behind the engine bay. Electrically actuated pop-up headlights contain twin round lamps in each for all 8, QV and 3.2 models, and a single homofocal rectangular unit each side of the Mondial t.

U.S. market models feature rectangular side turn-indicator lamps, front and rear.

=== Engine ===
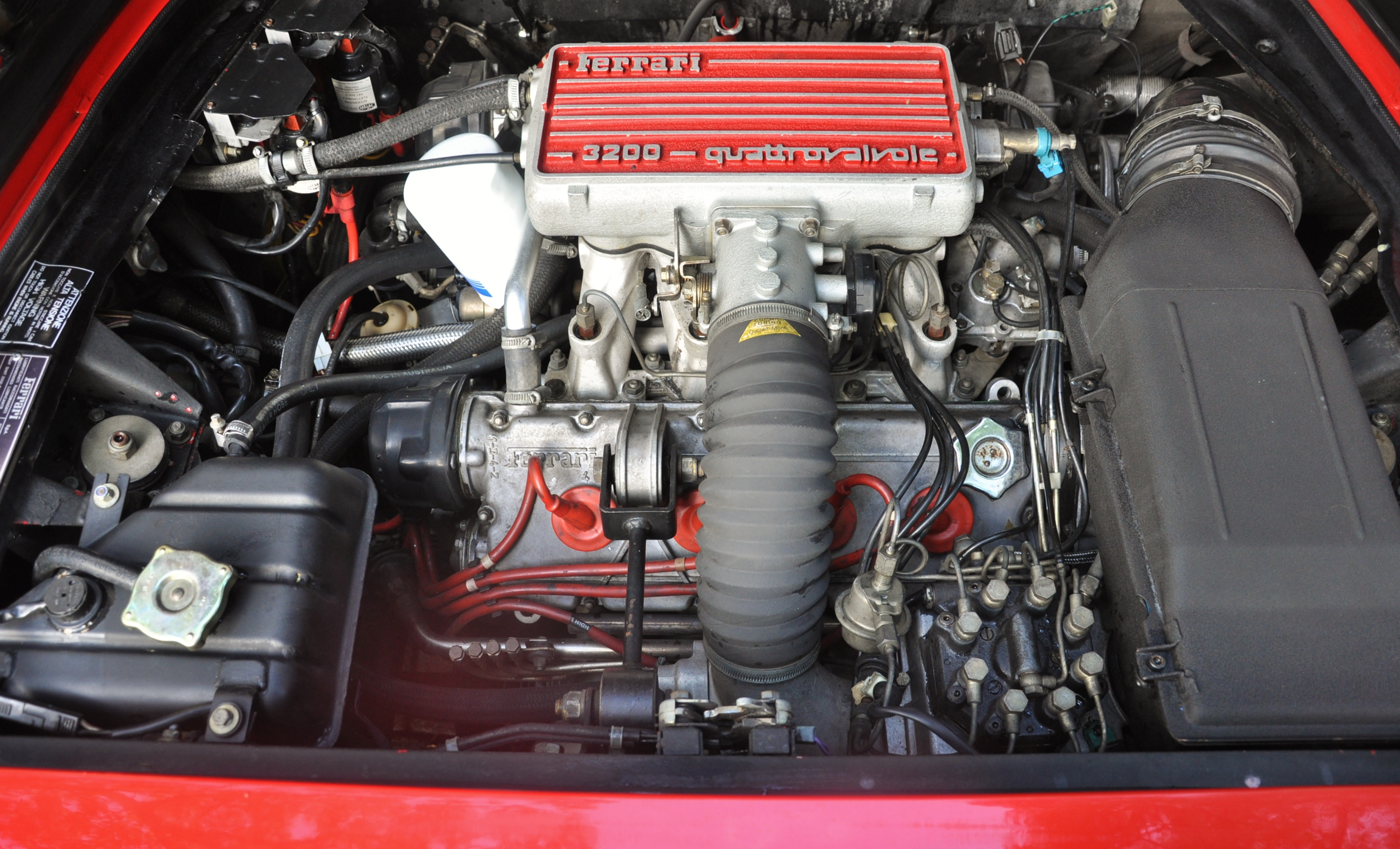
Mondial 3.2 engine bay

All Mondials are fitted with a V8 engine deriving from Ferrari's original 2.9 L (180 cu in) V8 powerplant released in the 1974 Ferrari (Dino) 308 GT4.

Mondial engines comprise a lightweight alloy V8 block with 90° bank-angle; shrink-fit cylinder liners; a five-bearing, flat-plane crankshaft with paired connecting rods on each journal; belt-driven, quad overhead camshafts (two per cylinder bank) acting directly on the valves; alloy crossflow cylinder heads; and a wet-sump lubrication system (excepting the Mondial t, which used a dry-sump system). Engine displacement started at 2.9 L (180 cu in) for the Mondial 8 and QV models, increasing to 3.2 L (200 cu in) for the Mondial 3.2, and culminating in 3.4 L (210 cu in) for the Mondial t model. The orientation of the 3.4 V8 engine block is unique in Mondial t models. Mirroring the two-seater Ferrari V8 vehicles, all 3.0 and 3.2 L engines sit across the car with their crankshaft and cylinder planes transverse to the main vehicle axis. The 3.4 L engine in the Mondial t (and 348 GTB cousin) is rotated ninety degrees to a longitudinal orientation with respect to the car.

In the Mondial 8 the V8 employs two valves-per-cylinder, and this increases to four valves-per-cylinder for the Quattrovalvole QV and all later models. All models feature a cast-alloy intake housing nestled centrally above the engine "vee" with manifold tubing running directly to each cylinder. Marelli electronic ignition is used on all vehicles with the exception of the Mondial t, and comprises twin coils, a separate distributor run off each bank of cylinders, and a common electronic control module. Again excepting the Mondial t, fuel metering is via Bosch K Jetronic continuous fuel injection with lambda exhaust sensing. For the Mondial t, a Bosch Motronic 2.5 or 2.7 engine management system controls both the ignition and fuel metering functions. Exhaust gases on all models are collected via 4-2-1 systems fitted to the outside of each cylinder bank, flowing through a one or two catalytic converters to twin outlets each side of the rear panel.

Ferrari Mondial V8 engine specifications
Engine code	Volume	Bore	Stroke	Power*	Torque*	Comp ratio	Max rpm	Years	Vehicle model	0-60 mph (0-97 km/h)	Source
F106B	2,926 cc (178.6 cu in)	81 mm (3.19 in)	71 mm (2.80 in)	157 kW (214 hp) at 6600 rpm	243 N⋅m (179 lb⋅ft) at 4600 rpm	8.8:1	7700	1980–82	Mondial 8	8.2 sec	Motor Trend 1981
F105A	2,926 cc (178.6 cu in)	81 mm (3.19 in)	71 mm (2.80 in)	177 kW (240 hp) at 6800 rpm	255 N⋅m (188 lb⋅ft) at 5500 rpm	8.6:1	7700	1982–85	Mondial QV	6.4 sec	Motor 1982
F105C	3,185 cc (194.4 cu in)	83 mm (3.27 in)	73.6 mm (2.90 in)	199 kW (270 hp) at 7000 rpm	304 N⋅m (224 lb⋅ft) at 5500 rpm	9.8:1	7700	1985–89	Mondial 3.2	6.3 sec	Car and Driver 1987
F119D or G	3,405 cc (207.8 cu in)	85 mm (3.35 in)	75 mm (2.95 in)	221 kW (300 hp) at 7200 rpm	324 N⋅m (239 lb⋅ft) at 4200 rpm	10.4:1	7500	1989–93	Mondial t	5.6 sec	Autocar June 1992

- Power and torque figures quoted are for European versions

=== Transmission ===
In the Mondial 8, QV, and 3.2 models, the transmission housing is integral with the engine sump casting, albeit with its own oil supply, sitting below and slightly to one side of the main block. Drive to the gearbox is via a single-plate, diaphragm-spring clutch and a set of drop-gears located outboard of the left-hand end of the crankshaft, with output torque feeding into a friction-plate limited-slip final drive unit offset to the rear of the gearbox.

A five-speed, all-indirect manual transmission using a "dog-leg" selector pattern was the only transmission offered. Instead of the conventional "H" shift pattern, this arrangement (also known as a "reverse h-gate") has 1st gear situated to the far left and back, behind reverse. This pattern has been popular with racing gearboxes, as it allows quicker, more direct shifts between 2nd and 3rd, and 4th and 5th, gears. The output from the final drive to the rear wheels is via a pair of short, solid drive shafts fitted with constant-velocity joints at each end to allow for suspension articulation.

For these models, clutch actuation is hydraulic, unlike their two-seater cousins' cable systems, and transmission selection is via a rod which extends through the centre chassis tunnel and passes through the engine sump into the transmission housing.

For the Mondial t, the engine and transmission were substantially reconfigured and their orientations rotated by ninety degrees to place the axes of both the engine crankshaft and the transmission input shafts parallel to the vehicle's longitudinal axis. The transmission and final-drive units form a combined transaxle arrangement fitted to the rear of the engine block, using a design originally derived from Ferrari's 312T Formula 1 car. Drive from the single-plate clutch enters the gearbox and is turned ninety degrees by bevel gears to the main transmission shafts which are aligned transverse to the vehicle. A parallel crownwheel with integral limited-slip action directs output torque to driveshafts with CV joints at each end. The clutch is hydraulically actuated, and gear selection is via cable operation.

in 1991, an "auto-clutch" option became available on the Mondial t, developed by French supplier Valeo. Essentially, this turned the transmission from a conventional manual into a clutchless manual. This system retained the conventional manual transmission mechanicals but replaced the normal clutch linkage mechanism with an electro-mechanical actuator, without a foot-operated clutch pedal. Clutch engagement and disengagement on the Valeo unit is triggered by the movement of the gear-lever, although the electronic control unit combines data from sources including engine, road-speed, and gear selection to warn against, or over-ride, attempted selections outside the specified operating limits.

=== Suspension and running gear ===
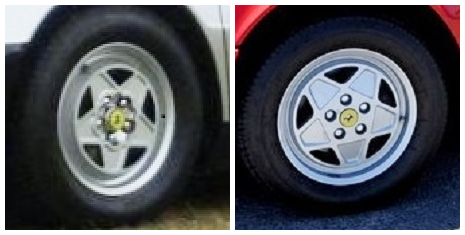
Mondial 8 and QV wheel (left) Mondial 3.2 and t wheel (right)

Although based on the two-seater vehicle designs, Mondials are slightly larger overall including having appreciably wider front and rear track dimensions. Suspension systems are fully independent all-round, comprising unequal-length upper and lower wishbones, coil-over damper units and anti-roll bars at each end of the vehicle. Mondial t vehicles include a driver-adjustable selector to set the electronically controlled damper units, providing three choices of ride-stiffness adjustment.

Steering is a rack-and-pinion mechanism sitting ahead of the front wheels, unpowered on all 8, QV and 3.2 models. Hydraulic power-assistance was standard on the subsequent Mondial t model. Braking is via four-wheel ventilated disks with split-circuit vacuum assistance on all vehicles. Anti-lock braking (ABS) was available as an option in 1987, and it was fitted as standard from 1988.

Wheels on all vehicles are of a five-spoke alloy design in a clear-lacquered finish. Two distinct patterns were used: the Mondial 8 and QV models have wheels with a flat centre and pronounced edges to the five spokes, whereas the 3.2 and t models' wheels have a convex centre and smoother, angled spokes. All wheels feature a yellow circular centre cap bearing Ferrari's black Cavallino Rampante rearing-horse logo.

Mondials until the late 1980s, including all 8 and QV models and many 3.2s, were originally fitted with Michelin TRX tyres of size 220/55 VR 390 front and 240/55 VR390 rear. TRX tyres require wheels with the proprietary TRX rim profile, meaning all vehicles fitted with such wheels could only utilise TRX-style tyres. Later 3.2 vehicles and the Mondial t reverted to industry-standard wheel designs of size 7x16 front and 8x16 rear, enabling a far wider range of tyre choices to suit the 205/55 VR16 front and 225/55 VR16 rear tyre specifications.

=== Interior ===
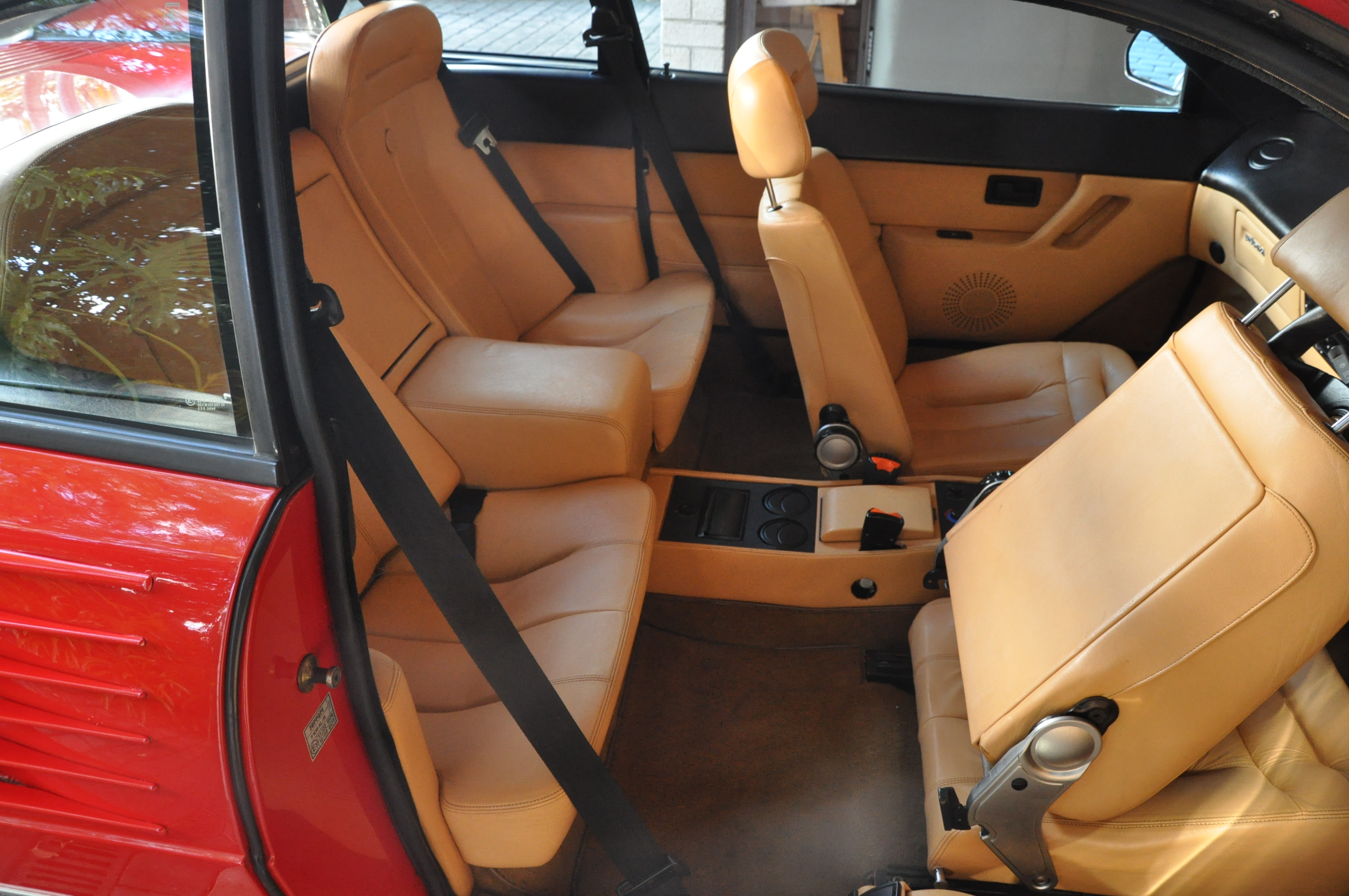
Ferrari 3.2 Coupé interior

The seats and interior of all Mondial variants are fully trimmed in Connolly hide with the exception of the use of black vinyl for the dashboard top and upper door linings. Paint, upholstery and carpet colours generally match those available on Ferrari's concurrent two-seater models, with the most common choices being Rosso Corsa or Rosso Dino (reds), Azzurro (blue) and Nero (black), in combination with beige, tan or black leather. All seats including those in the rear are strongly bucket-shaped, and fitted with inertia-reel seatbelts.

A central tunnel for the chassis structure is prominent in both front and rear footwells, and is straddled by a large front centre console with a polished open-gated gear selector and electronic warning-light panel. Electric windows (the front panes only are opening) and air-conditioning are standard fitments, with their controls on the central console. The handbrake is located outside the driver's seat beside the inner sill, and is a "drop-down" design to assist ingress and egress. A three-spoked leather steering wheel is mounted to a steering column adjustable for reach and rake, behind which is a "pod-style" instrument binnacle holding six gauges: speedometer, tachometer, fuel level, water temperature, oil pressure and oil temperature. The Mondial instrumentation is completed with a comprehensive set of warning lights and electronic check panels.

== History ==
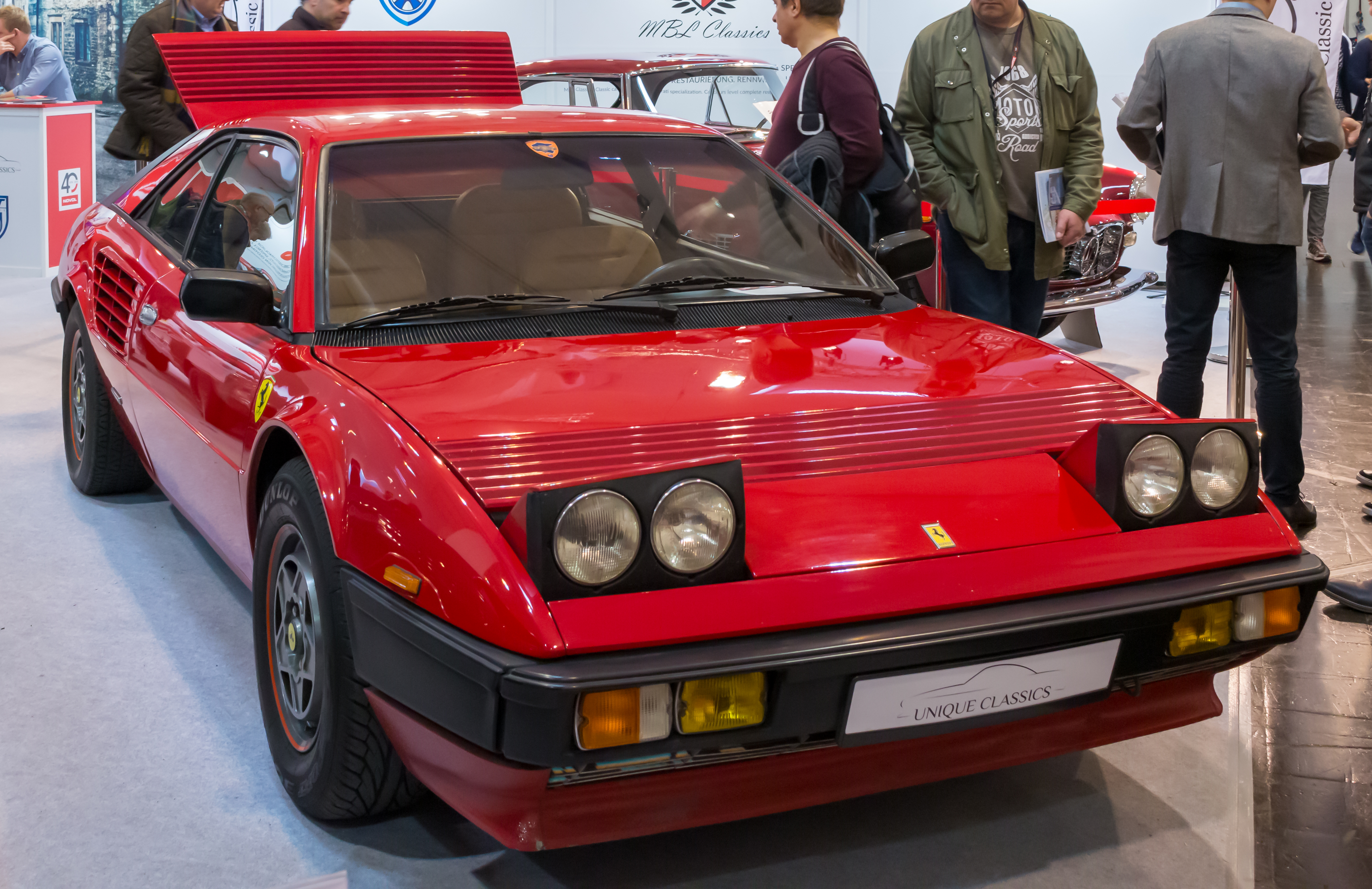
1981 Ferrari Mondial with its headlights open

The Mondial was, at the time, one of Ferrari's most commercially successful models, with over 6,000 examples produced over its thirteen-year run. The Mondial underwent many updates throughout its production with four distinct variants produced: the Mondial 8, Mondial QV, Mondial 3.2, and Mondial t. All but the Mondial 8 were released in both coupé and cabriolet (convertible) body form.

Starting with the Mondial 8 coupé launched in 1980, the vehicle which served as sole V8-engined Grand Touring or "GT" vehicle within the Ferrari range proved to be a disappointment to some Ferrari enthusiasts. With a body that was larger, heavier and less aerodynamically efficient than the equivalent two-seater models, combined with the introduction of tougher emission standards which significantly dropped power outputs, overall vehicle performance inevitably decreased. In addition, Ferrari responded to new safety requirements, especially in the U.S., with large, black, over-dominant bumpers which were considered to have negatively affected the external design. The fact that the Mondial 8 was a significantly more expensive vehicle than its better-performing two-seater 308 GTBi sister somewhat compounded the situation.

Ferrari acted quickly just two years later in 1982 to address the straight-line performance issues, by upgrading the engine with a new four-valve head. This model, the Mondial Quattrovalvole or QV, shared its engine with the contemporary two-seaters 308 GTB/GTS QV. A new cabriolet version was also introduced at this time, a body style which would be carried forward through all subsequent Mondial models.

The next evolution was the Mondial 3.2 produced from 1985, which saw the engine grow in displacement and power, and both the internal and external styling significantly refreshed. This car has enjoyed strong popularity within the Mondial range due to it being a good all-round performer and one of the last Ferraris to have the relatively straightforward maintenance provided by the Ferrari 328 engine and transmission configuration.

The final Mondial variant was the Mondial t, released in 1989. This contained some of the biggest changes in the Mondial history, with an even-larger 3.4 L (210 cu in) engine, a substantial update to the exterior styling and interior ergonomics, and with an entirely new, albeit more complex to service, powertrain. Overall the Mondial t is considered the best vehicle in the range regarding overall performance and refinement, although it is often noted that this comes at the cost of greater maintenance.

Production of the Mondial ceased in 1993, with a total of 6,149 vehicles from all variants having been manufactured.

== Mondial 8 ==
Mondial 8
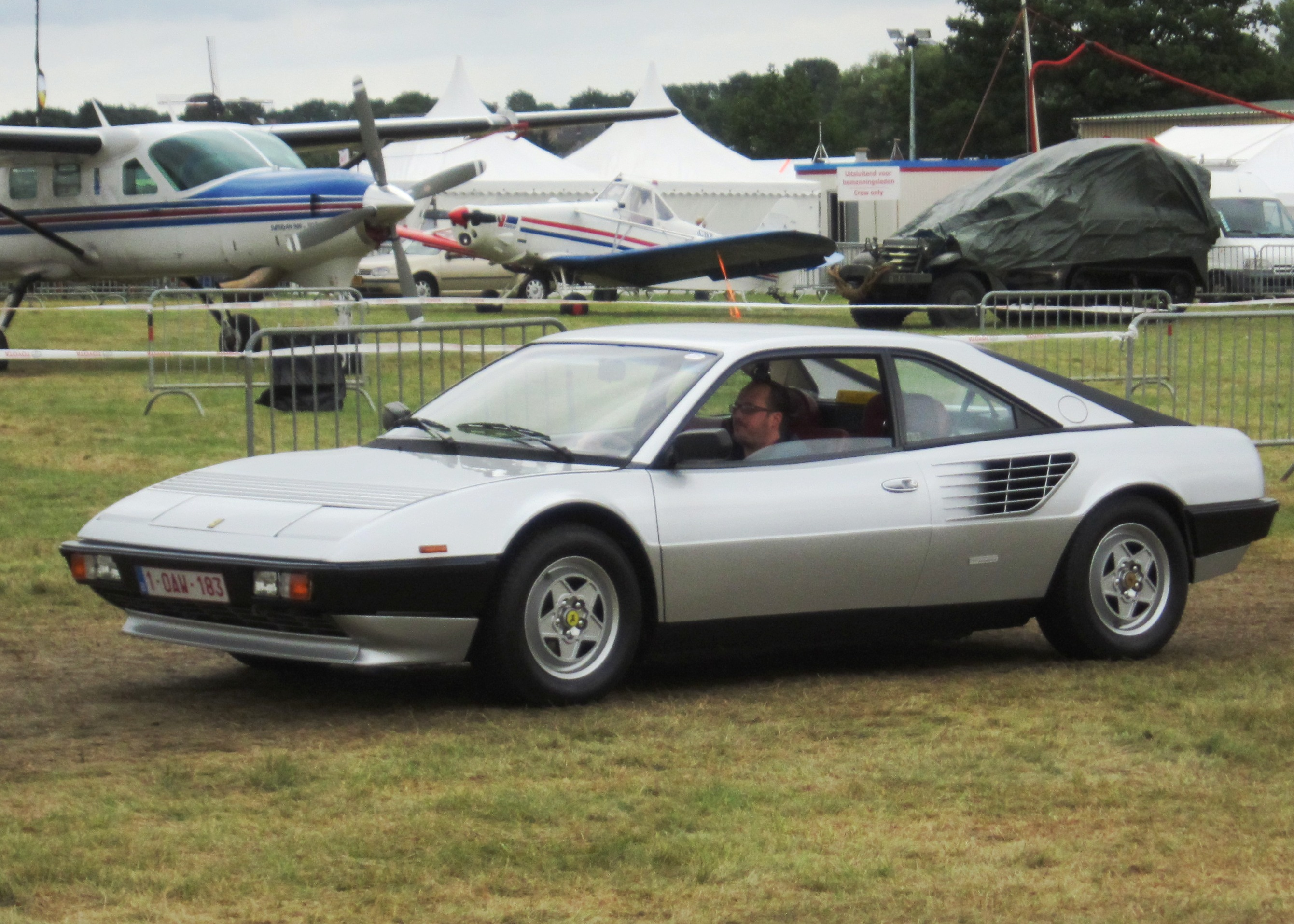

Overview
- Production: 1980–1982

Body and chassis
- Body style: 2+2 coupé
- Layout: Transverse, rear mid-engine, rear-wheel-drive

Powertrain
- Engine: 2.9 L Tipo F106B FI V8
- Transmission: 5-speed manual

Dimensions
- Wheelbase: 2,650 mm (104.3 in)
- Length: 4,580 mm (180.3 in)
- Width: 1,790 mm (70.5 in)
- Height: 1,250 mm (49.2 in)
- Curb weight: 1,569 kg (3,459 lb)

The first Mondial iteration introduced as the Mondial 8 at the 1980 Geneva Auto Salon. It was the first Ferrari to depart from the company's simple 3-digit naming scheme, and some reviews found it relatively mild, compared to other Ferraris, regarding performance, drawing criticism from some in the motoring press. It used a mid/rear-mounted Bosch K-Jetronic fuel injection V8, shared with the 308 GTBi/GTSi, mounted transversely. The engine used in the 1973 Dino 308 GT4. The K-Jetronic system is mechanical, with a high-pressure pump which streams fuel continuously to the injectors; it does not have a computer, just a few relays to handle the cold start sequence etc.

The chassis was also based on the 308 GT4, but with a 100 mm-longer (3.9 in) wheelbase at 2,650 mm (104.3 in). The suspension was the classic layout of unequal-length double wishbones and Koni dampers all around.

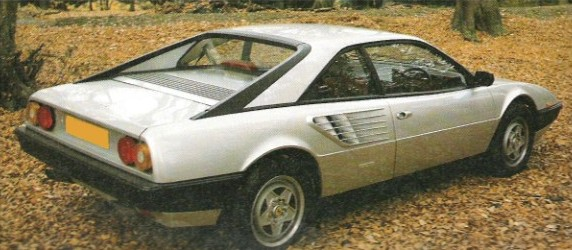
Rear view of Mondial 8

== Mondial Quattrovalvole ==
Mondial QV (Quattrovalvole)

Overview
- Production: 1982–1985

Body and chassis
- Body style: 2+2 coupé 2+2 cabriolet
- Layout: Transverse, rear mid-engine, rear-wheel-drive

Powertrain
- Engine: 2.9 L Tipo F105A 32V V8
- Transmission: 5-speed manual

Dimensions
- Wheelbase: 2,650 mm (104.3 in)
- Length: 4,580 mm (180.3 in)
- Width: 1,790 mm (70.5 in)
- Height: 1,260 mm (49.6 in)
- Curb weight: 1,555 kg (3,428 lb); 1,607 kg (3,543 lb) (Cabriolet)

The first Mondial engine, although a DOHC design, used just two valves per cylinder. The 1982 Quattrovalvole or QV introduced a new four-valve head; the combustion chamber design purportedly based on the early eighties Formula 1 engine. Again, the engine was shared with the contemporary 308 GTB/GTS QV, and produced 240 hp (177 kW). Appearance was largely as per the Mondial 8, although with red engine heads and prominent "Quattrovalvole" script at the rear. 1,145 coupés built between 1982 and 1985.

=== Mondial QV Cabriolet ===
A new Cabriolet convertible model was added for 1983. The body styling remained the same as the coupé variant, with the roof maintaining the 'buttress' design, though the Cabriolet required the rear seats to be mounted closer together laterally. The introduction of the Cabriolet saw the popularity of the Mondial rise, particularly in the American market, where a convertible option was highly desirable. The Cabriolet has the added distinction of being the only four-seat, mid-rear engine, convertible automobile ever manufactured in regular production. 629 units were produced between 1983 and 1985, making this the rarest version of the Mondial.

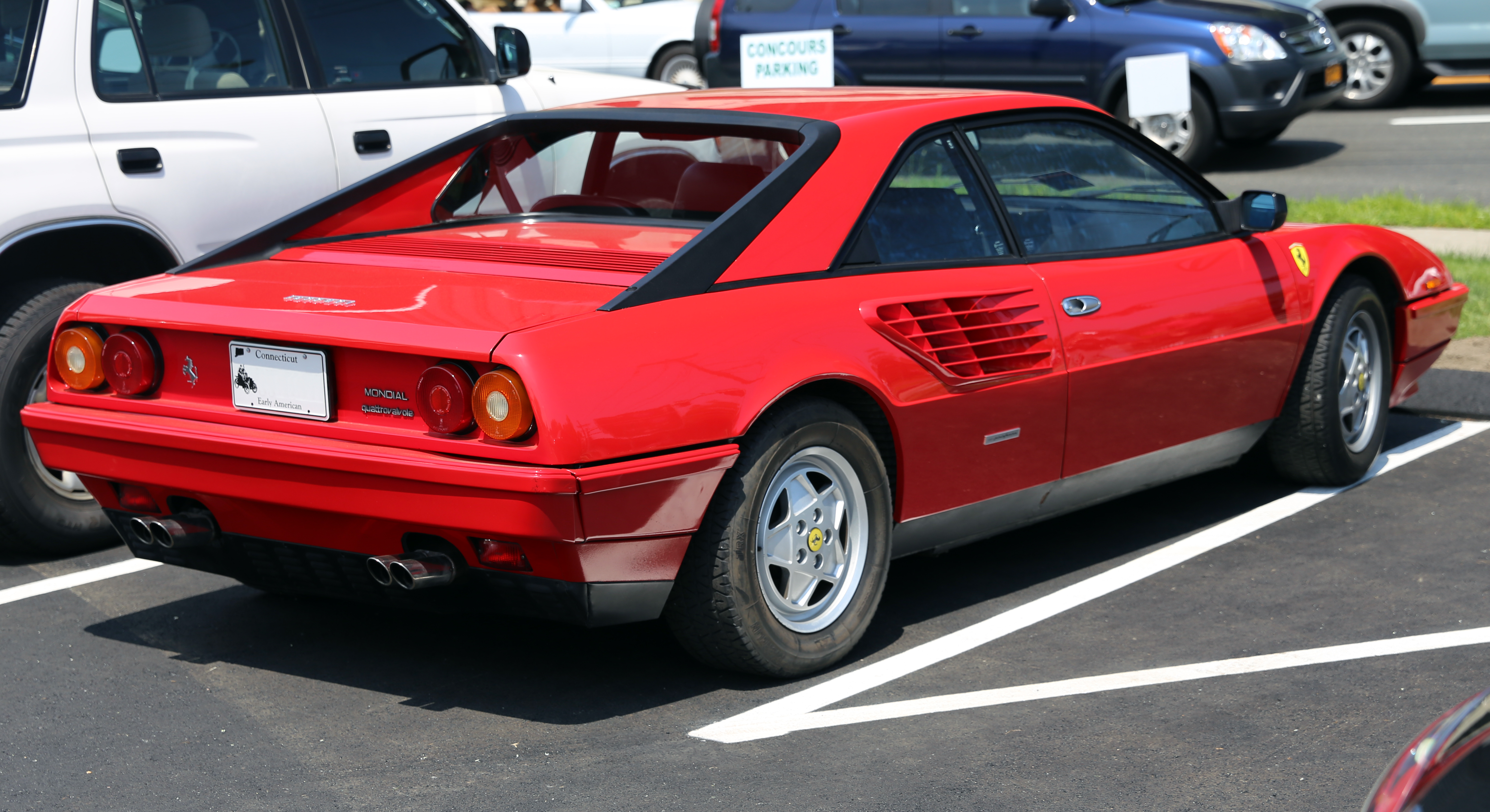
Mondial Quattrovalvole coupé (rear view)

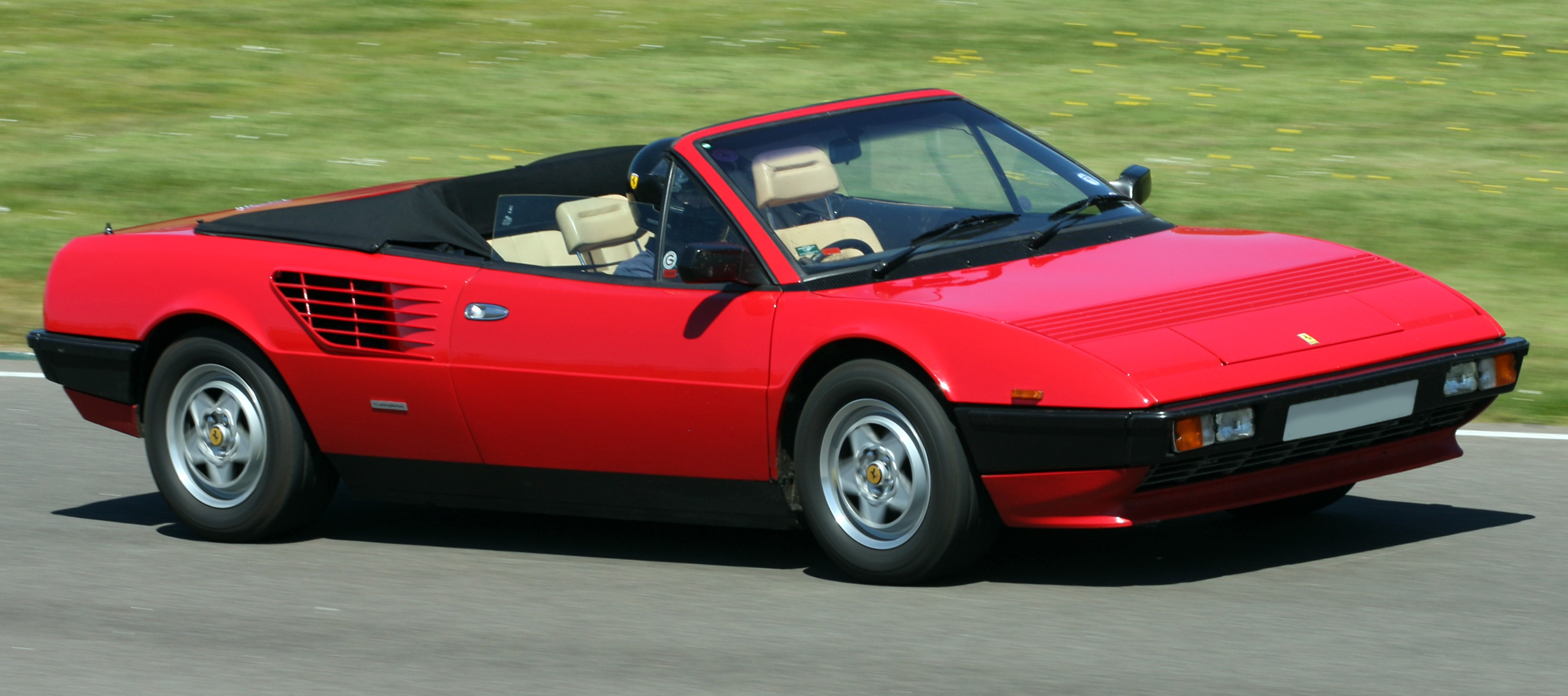
Mondial Quattrovalvole cabriolet

== Mondial 3.2 ==
Mondial 3.2
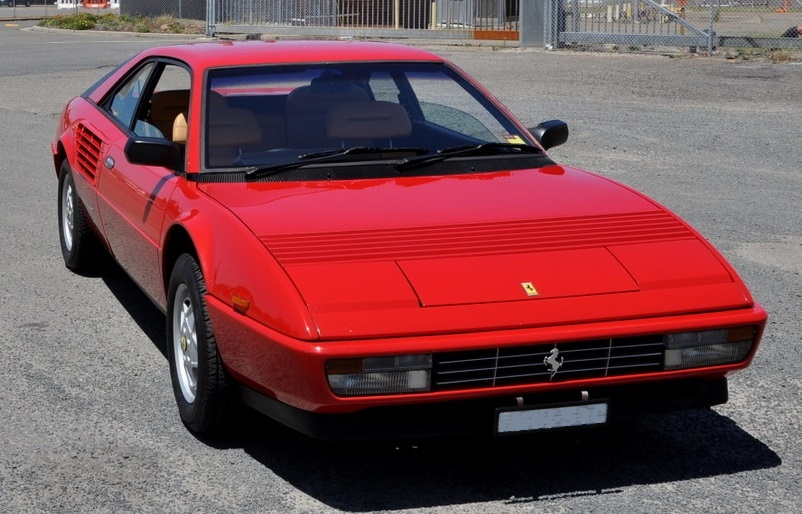

Overview
- Production: 1985–1988

Body and chassis
- Body style: 2+2 coupé 2+2 cabriolet
- Layout: Transverse, rear mid-engine, rear-wheel-drive

Powertrain
- Engine: 3.2 L Tipo F105C 32V V8
- Transmission: 5-speed manual

Dimensions
- Wheelbase: 2,650 mm (104.3 in)
- Length: 4,535 mm (178.5 in)
- Width: 1,795 mm (70.7 in)
- Height: 1,235 mm (48.6 in); 1,265 mm (49.8 in) (Cabriolet)
- Curb weight: 1,540 kg (3,395 lb); 1,607 kg (3,543 lb) (Cabriolet)

Like the new Ferrari 328, the Mondial's engine grew in both bore and stroke to 3.2 L (3,185 cc) in 1985. Output was now 270 hp (199 kW). The Mondial 3.2 was first presented at the 1985 Frankfurt Auto Show in September that year.

Available in both Coupé and Cabriolet forms, styling refreshed with restyled and body-coloured bumpers, similar to the 328 with more integrated indicators and driving lamps, and new alloy wheels with a more rounded face. The 3.2 also boasted a major interior update, with a more ergonomic layout and a more rounded instrument binnacle. Later cars, from 1987 onwards, also sported ABS brakes. Fuel injection remained the primarily mechanical Bosch K-Jetronic (CIS) with an O_{2} sensor in the exhaust providing feedback to a simple computer for mixture trimming via a pulse modulated frequency valve that regulated control fuel pressure. The ignition system was Marelli Microplex, with electronic advance control and one distributor per bank of the V8. The 1988 Mondial 3.2 would be the final model year that retained the relatively low maintenance costs of the 308/328 drivetrain, allowing major service items like timing belt and clutch replacement performed with the engine/transmission package still in the car.

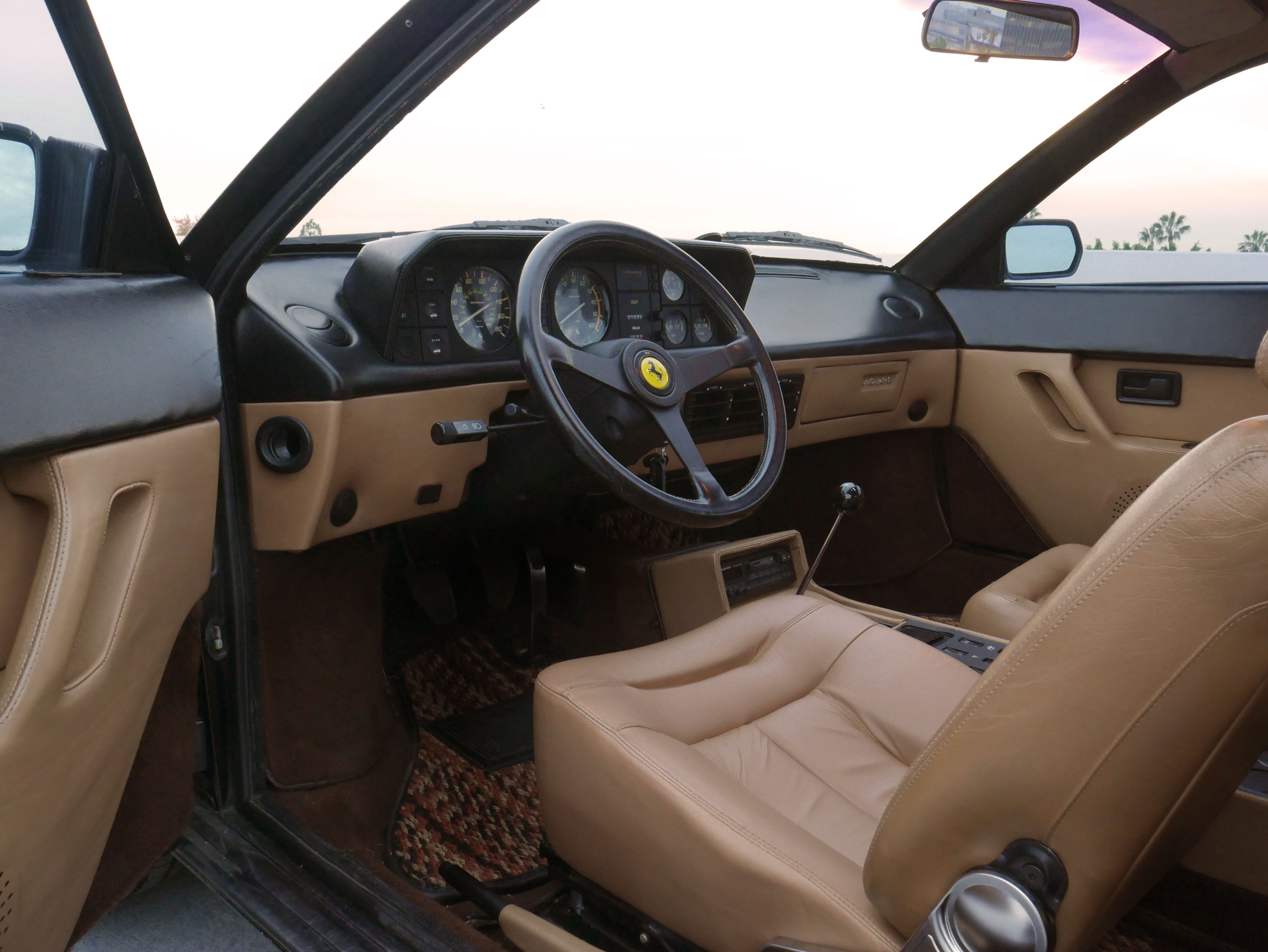
1988 Mondial 3.2 Coupé interior

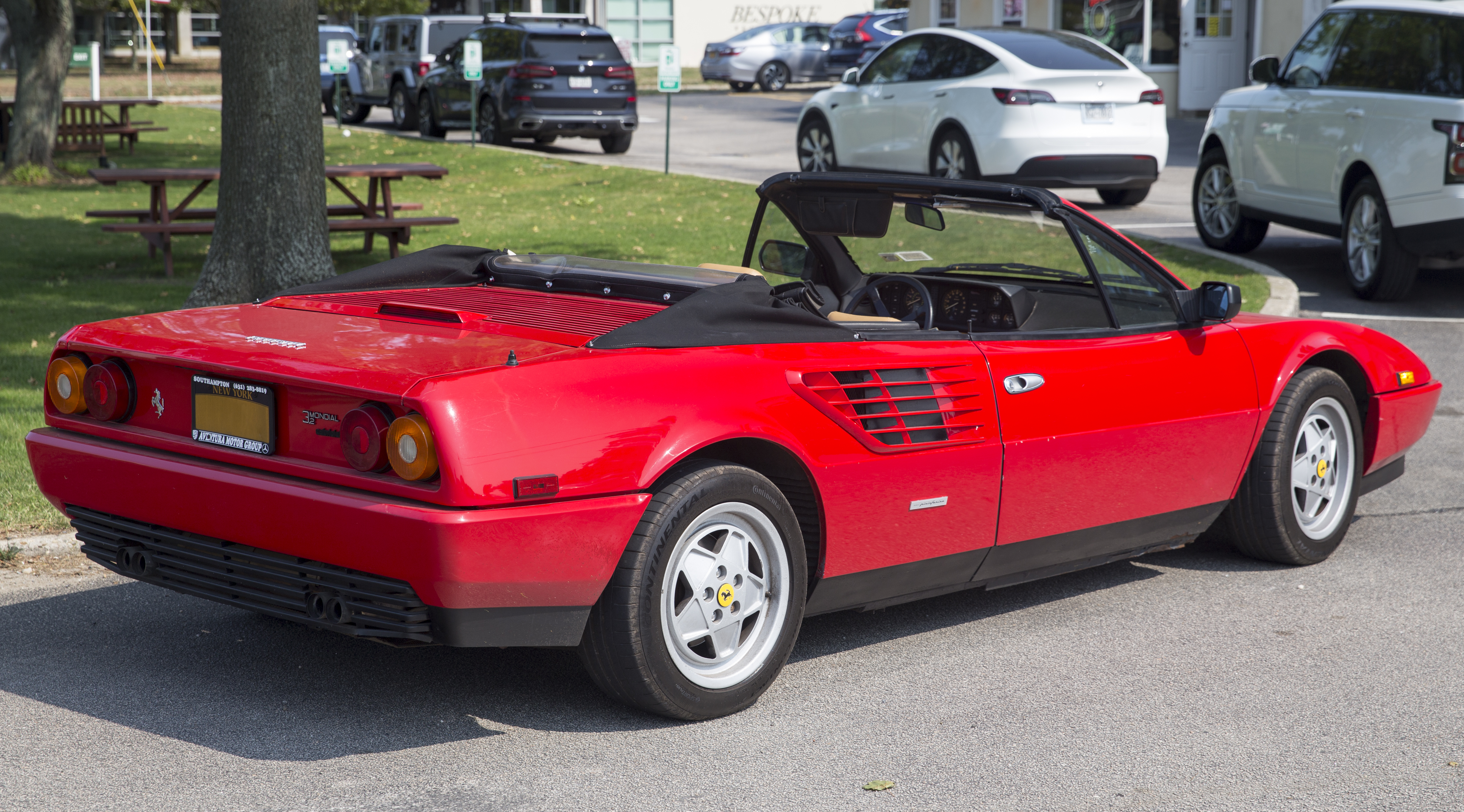
Ferrari Mondial 3.2 Cabriolet (rear view)

== Mondial t ==
Mondial t
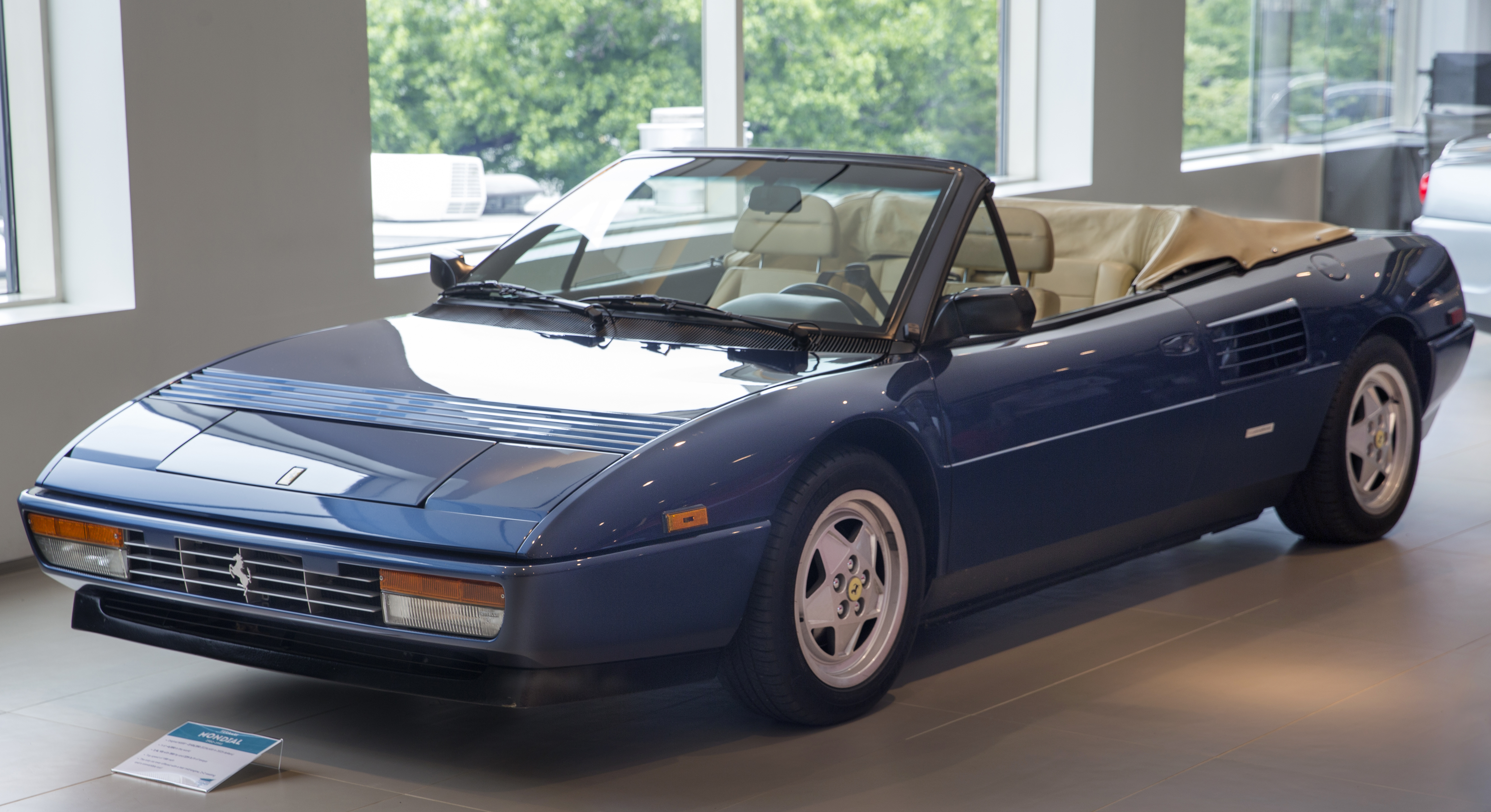

Overview
- Production: 1988–1993
- Model years: 1989–1993

Body and chassis
- Body style: 2+2 coupé 2+2 cabriolet
- Layout: Longitudinal, rear mid-engine, rear-wheel-drive

Powertrain
- Engine: 3.4 L Tipo F119D/G V8
- Transmission: 5-speed manual 5-speed Valeo auto-clutch manual

Dimensions
- Wheelbase: 2,650 mm (104.3 in)
- Length: 4,535 mm (178.5 in)
- Width: 1,810 mm (71.3 in)
- Height: 1,235 mm (48.6 in)
- Curb weight: 1,560 kg (3,439 lb); 1,570 kg (3,461 lb) (Cabriolet)

The final Mondial evolution was 1989's Mondial t (Coupé and Cabriolet). It was a substantially changed model, "spearhead of a new generation of V8 Ferraris", according to Road & Track magazine. It was visually different from preceding Mondial models, the most recognizable being the redesign of the air intakes to a smaller rectangular shape. Additionally, the door handles were of a visually different design, as were the front and rear bumpers which became body-colored. New front and rear wings cover wider tracks and are re-profiled to a fuller shape compared to previous models, which feature a rolled lip.

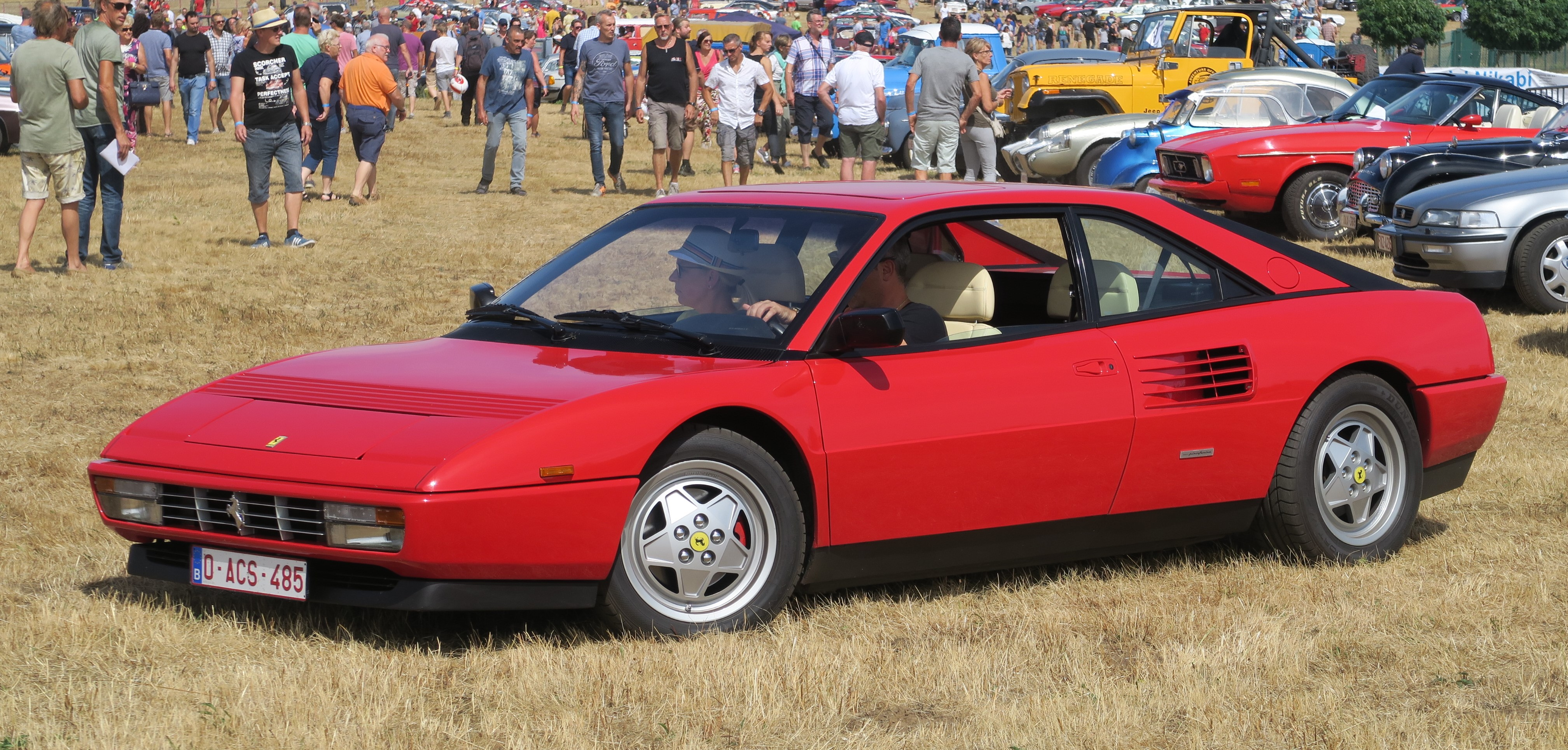
Mondial t

The 't' called attention to the car's new engine/transmission layout: the previously transverse engine mounted longitudinally while the gearbox remained transverse, thus forming a 't'. The 't' suffix was also homage to the first use of a transverse transmission by Ferrari in the highly successful Ferrari 312T, driven by F1 World Champion Niki Lauda. By adopting this layout, a longer engine could be mounted lower in the chassis, improving handling dramatically. The 't' configuration was used by Ferrari's Formula One cars of the 1980s, and would be the standard for the marque's future mid-engine V8 cars, beginning with the 348, introduced later in the year. The transverse manual gearbox fitted with a limited-slip differential with a twin-plate clutch design with bevel gears driving the wheels. Later in production, an electromechanical-actuated clutchless manual transmission, termed Valeo, was available as an option; where the driver would change gear using a traditional H-pattern gearshift, but the clutch was automatically actuated through electronic equipment, eliminating the need for a manually operated clutch pedal.

The new layout saw the engine and transmission mounted on a removable subframe; the assembly removed from the underside of the vehicle for maintenance. This process is necessary for timing belt replacement, making this a costly procedure for the owner who does not have a lift. On the other hand, the clutch was now located at the very rear of the drive train. This arrangement makes clutch replacement and service a simple, inexpensive, and readily owner-doable proposition.

The engine was up to 3.4 L (3405 cc) and 300 hp (221 kW). The engine was controlled by Bosch Motronic DME 2.5 (later DME 2.7) electronic engine management that integrated EFI and ignition control into a single computer unit. Two of these were used in the car: one for each bank of the engine. Engine lubrication upgraded to a dry-sump system.

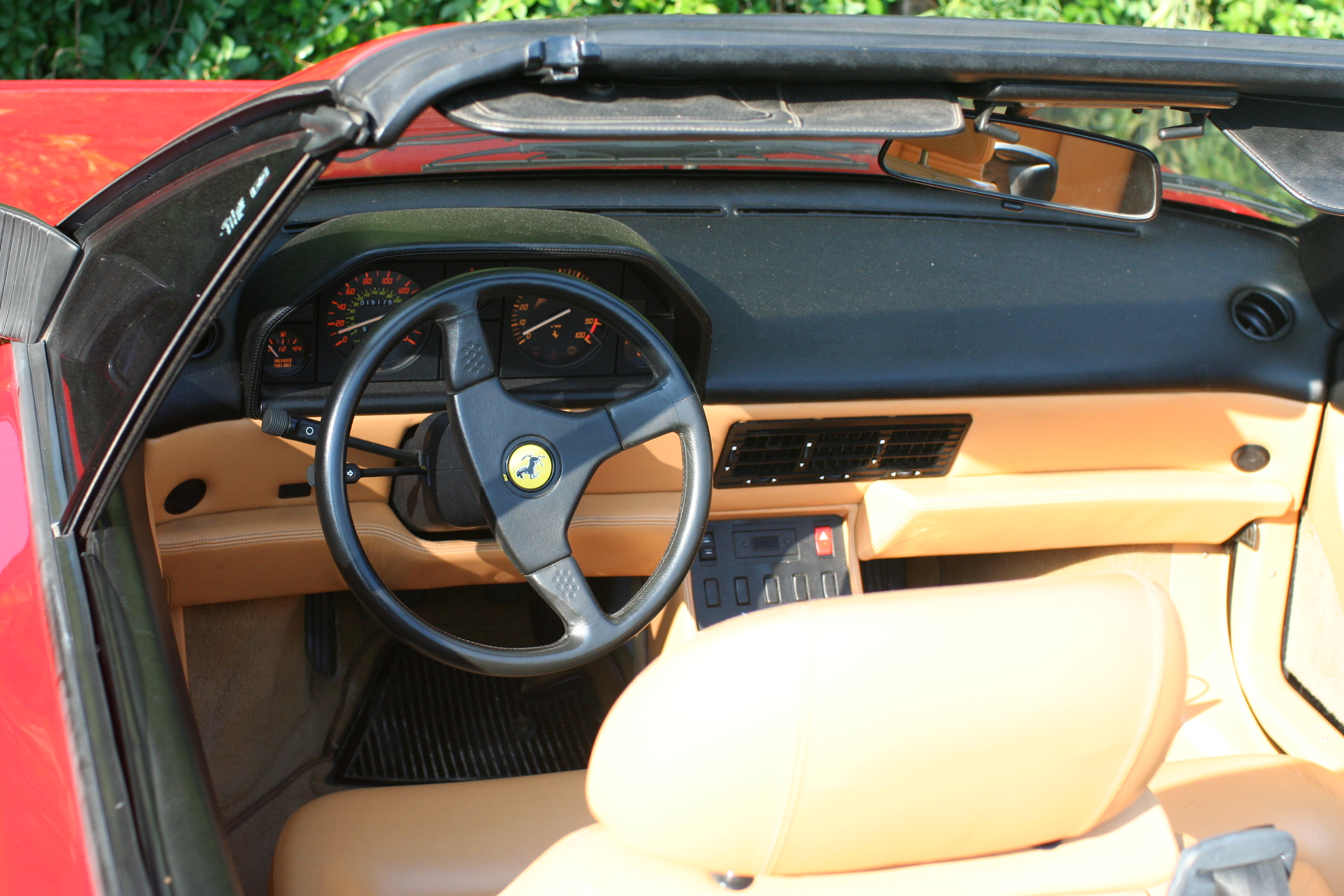
Interior

The "t" was home to other Ferrari firsts: It used power-assisted steering for the first time and had a 3-position electronically controlled suspension for a variable tradeoff between ride quality and road holding. It also had a standard anti-lock braking system.

The Mondial t represented the most substantial upgrade to the Mondial model line in performance and handling since its introduction in 1980. The "t" offered greater performance while retaining a mid-engine layout and a practical packaging layout, and was once again, favorably received.

The Mondial's chassis would underpin a new generation of two-seater Ferraris, right up to the Ferrari 360, but the 2+2 Mondial would end production just four and a half years later in 1993. However, the "t" layout of the engine and transaxle, adapted from Ferrari's Formula One cars, continues to be used in mid-engine V8 model Ferraris to date, albeit with a more sophisticated chassis.

The company has not produced a mid-engine 2+2 car since then, leaving the 2+2 configuration to the more classic front-engine design starting with the 456 in 1992. Since then, the GTC4Lusso, Portofino, Roma have been additional four-seat vehicle offerings – but all of these are front-engined, leaving the Mondial t as the most recent four-seat, mid-engine, Ferrari produced.

=== PPG Indy Pace Car ===
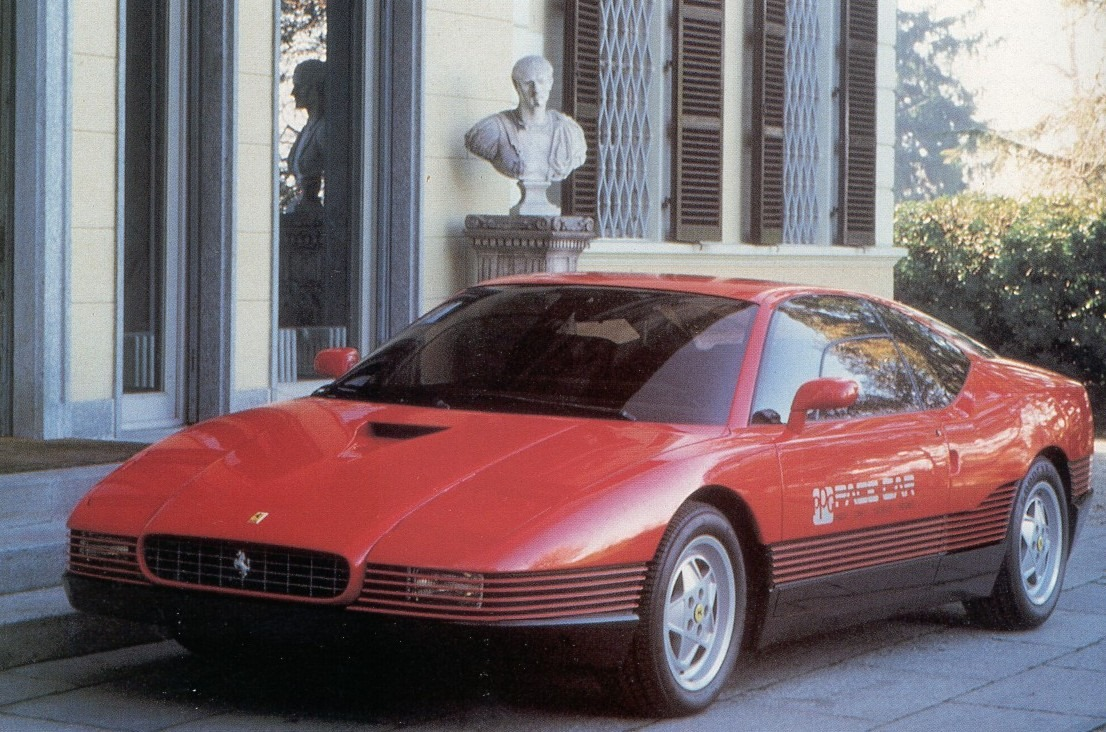
1987 Ferrari Mondial t Pace car s/n 76390

A Mondial t was manufactured exclusively by Ferrari for PPG Industries to use as a pace car for the PPG Indy Car World Series. Built under the design of Ercole Spada at I.DE.A Institute at a cost of approximately $1 million, it was introduced at the 1989 Champion Spark Plugs 300 in Laguna Seca.

== Legacy ==
The Mondial has historically been a target of derision from Ferrari enthusiasts, with many calling it one of the worst Ferraris ever made due its styling, performance and weight. Some enthusiasts, however, consider the car a future classic due to its low price relative to other classic Ferraris.

== Production numbers ==
Model/body		Production (total)	subtotals		Years built
Model/body		Production (total)	RHD	US/CDN	Years built
Mondial 8	Coupé	703	145	147	1980–1982
Mondial QV	Coupé	1145	152	69	1982–1985
Mondial QV	Cabriolet	629	27	282	1983–1985
Mondial 3.2	Coupé	987	91	87	1985–1988
Mondial 3.2	Cabriolet	810	57	449	1985–1988
Mondial t	Coupé	858	45	43	1988–1993
Mondial t	Cabriolet	1017	51	379	1989–1993
Coupé: 3,693	Cabrio: 2,456	6,149	568	1,456	
