= Ferrari GT4 =

Ferrari 308/208 GT4
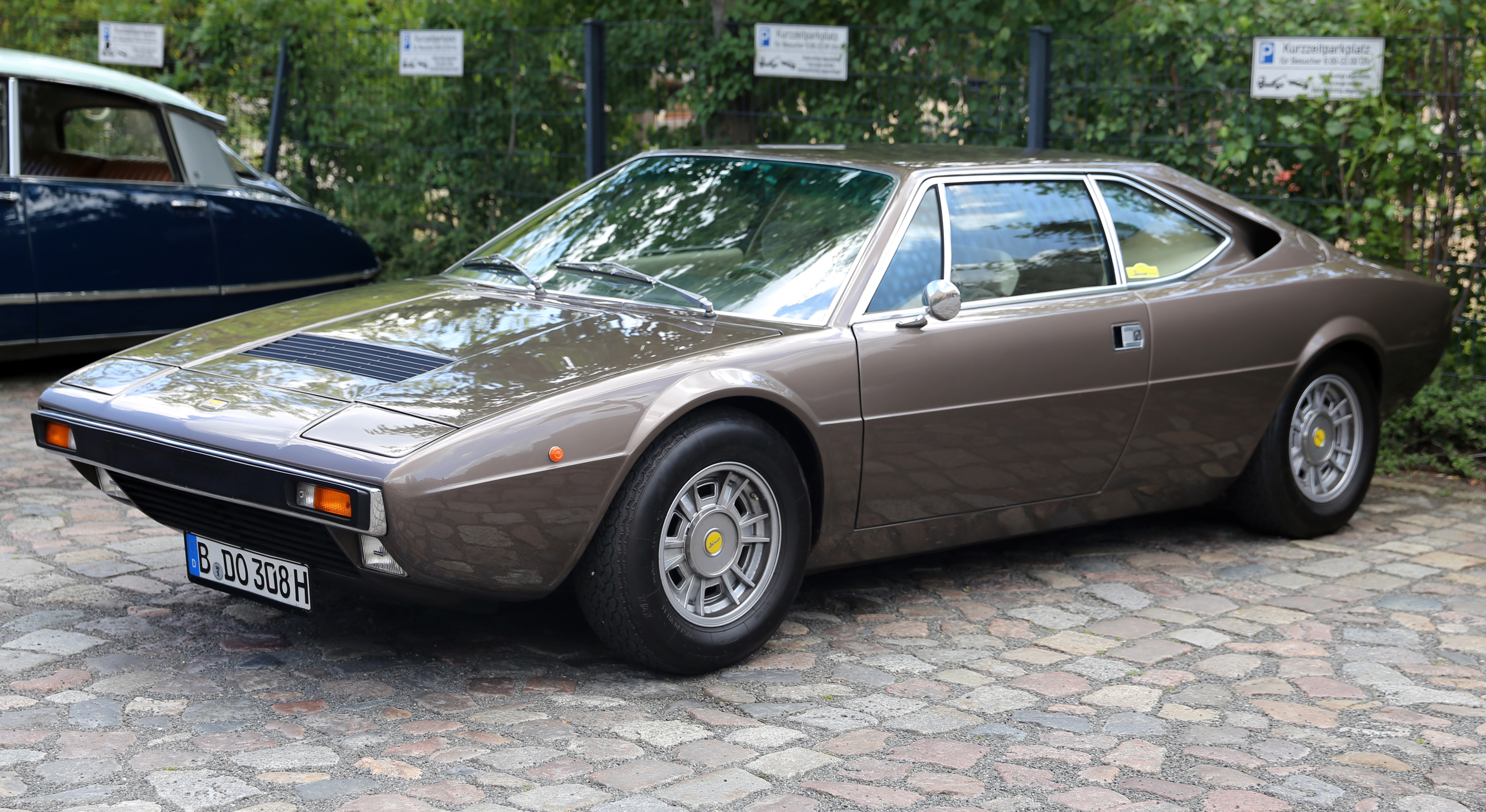
- 1975 Dino 308 GT4

Overview
- Manufacturer: Ferrari
- Also called: Dino 308/208 GT4 2+2 (until 1976)
- Production: 1973–1980 (308 GT4); 1975–1980 (208 GT4)
- Assembly: Italy: Modena
- Designer: Marcello Gandini at Bertone

Body and chassis
- Class: Sports car (S)
- Body style: 2-door 2+2 coupé
- Layout: Transverse, rear mid-engine, rear-wheel-drive
- Related: 208/308 GTB and GTS

Powertrain
- Engine: 2.9 L Dino V8 (308 GT4); 2.0 L Dino V8 (208 GT4)
- Transmission: 5-speed manual

Dimensions
- Wheelbase: 2,550 mm (100.4 in)
- Length: 4,300 mm (169.3 in); 4,488 mm (176.7 in) (U.S.)
- Width: 1,800 mm (70.9 in)
- Height: 1,180 mm (46.5 in)
- Kerb weight: 1,150 kg (2,535 lb) (dry)

Chronology
- Predecessor: Dino 206/246 GT
- Successor: Ferrari Mondial

The Dino 308 GT4 and 208 GT4 (later Ferrari 308 GT4 and 208 GT4) are mid-engined V8 2+2 cars built by Ferrari. The Dino 308 GT4 was introduced in 1973 and supplemented by the 208 GT4 in 1975. The cars were sold with Dino badging (continuing the Dino brand to differentiate non-V12 Ferrari) until May 1976, when they received Ferrari badging. It was the first production Ferrari to feature the rear mid-engined V8 layout that would become the bulk of the company's business in the succeeding decades. The GT4 was replaced by the Mondial 8 in 1980 after a production run of 2,826 308s and 840 208s.

== Design ==
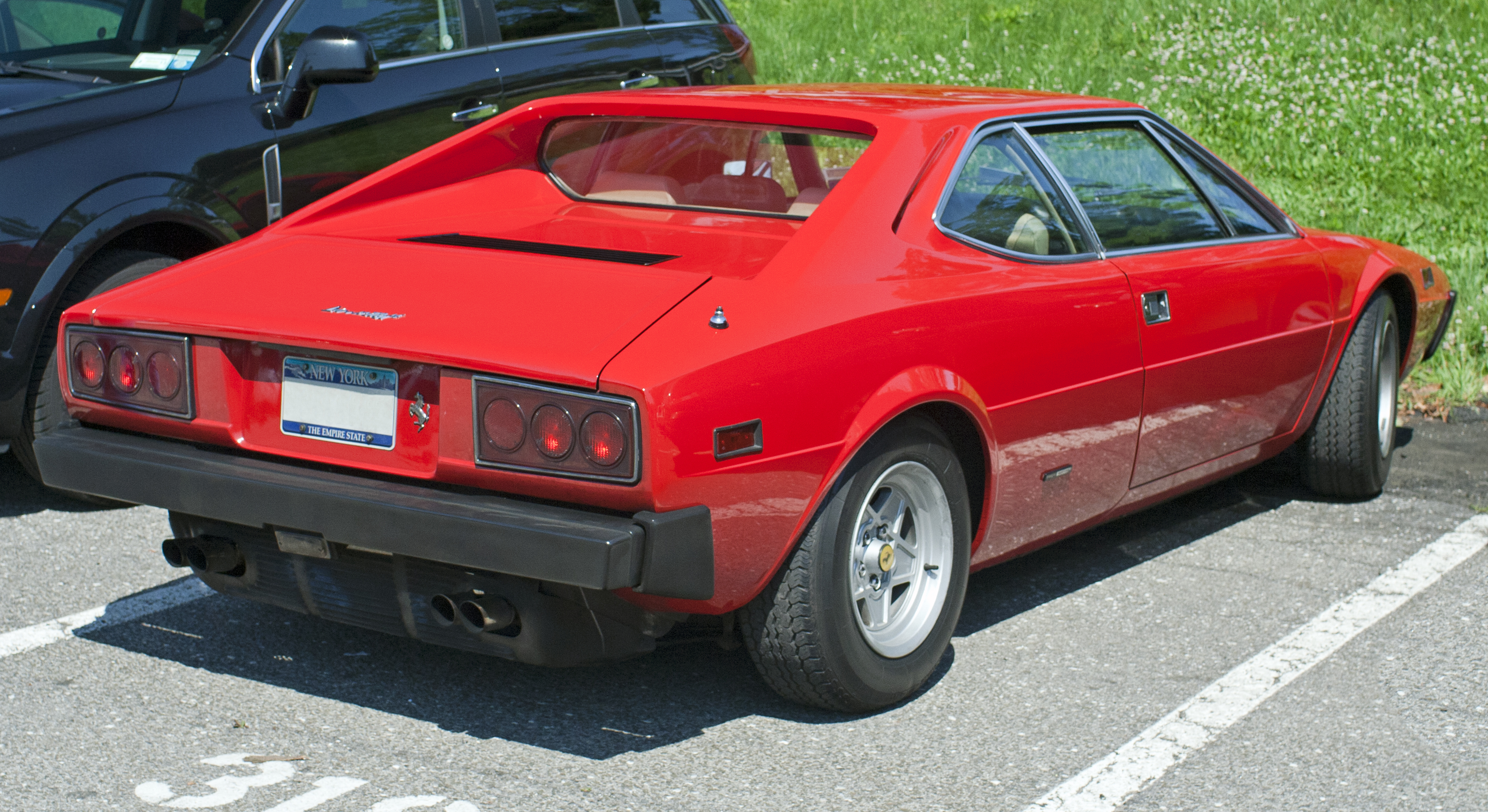
US vs EU spec Dino 308 GT4

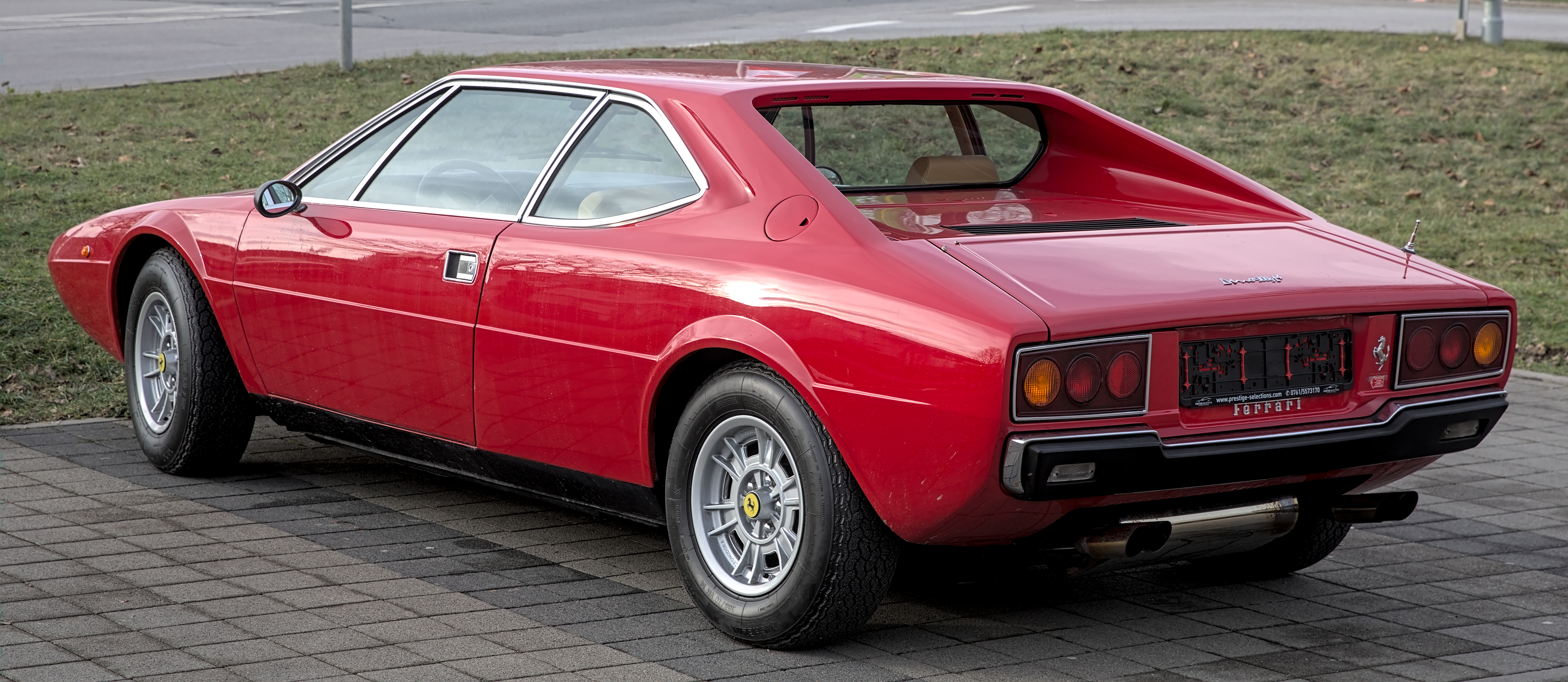

The GT4 is the only production Ferrari to feature bodywork designed by Bertone, though Bertone had created one off designs for Ferraris in the past. Pininfarina was upset by the decision to give cross-town rival Bertone the design, considering all they had done for Ferrari.

The design has sharp, angular shapes, in contrast to its more curvaceous two-seater predecessor, the Dino 246 GT and GTS, and was controversial at the time. Journalists compared it to the Bertone-designed Lancia Stratos and especially the Lamborghini Urraco – all were designed by Marcello Gandini, and Lamborghini had quickly become one of Ferrari's foremost competitors. The Dino 308 GT4 shared the Urraco's layout, and was styled by the same designer. Gandini was never again hired to design a Ferrari.

From the interior the driver sees only the road. Enzo Ferrari himself took a major role in its design, even having a mock-up made where he could sit in the car to test different steering, pedals and interior seating positioning.

== Specifications ==
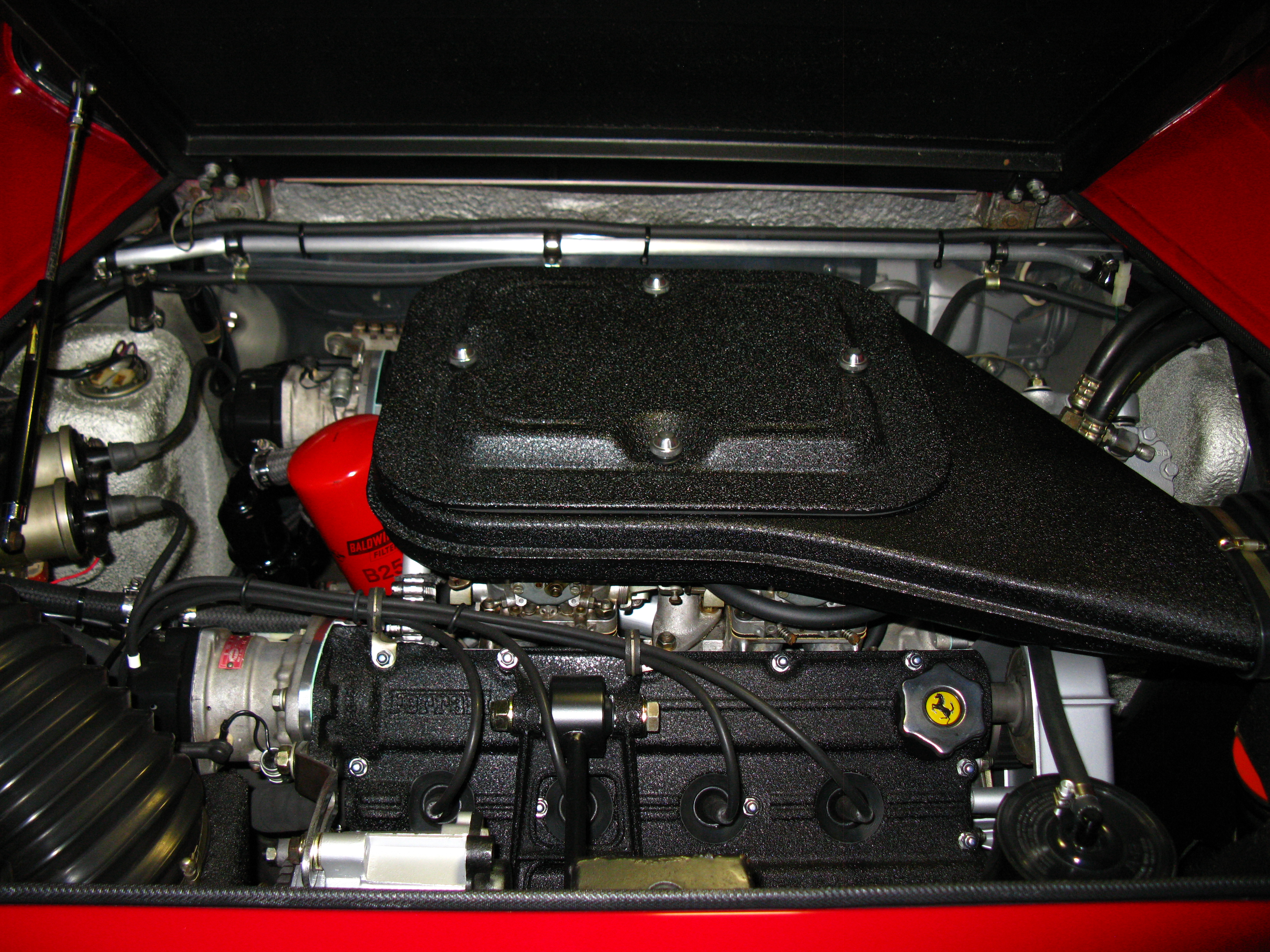
US-specification engine in a 1975 Dino 308 GT4.

The chassis was a tubular spaceframe based on the Dino 246, but was stretched for a 2,550 mm (100.4 in) wheelbase to make room for the second row of seats. The suspension was fully independent, with double wishbones, anti-roll bars, coaxial telescopic shock absorbers and coil springs on both axles. There are claims that Niki Lauda was involved in suspension setup prior to joining Ferrari which could have levered his aim to be the main Ferrari driver in F1. That is incorrect as Lauda denied it, having not joined Ferrari until after the launch of the GT4, and the final specification would have been decided some time before that. The confusion lies in advertising by the USA importer Chinetti, which wrongly claimed Lauda's involvement. Some creative licence was used when sales were difficult.

The 2.9 L (2927 cc) V8 was mounted transversally integrally joined with the 5-speed transaxle gearbox. It was fitted with 205/70VR14 Michelin XWX tires and 195/70R14 tyres on the 208 GT4. The engine had an aluminium alloy block and heads, 16 valves and dual overhead camshafts driven by toothed belts; it produced 255 hp (188 kW) in the European version and 240 hp (179 kW) in the American. The induction system used four Weber 40 DCNF carburetors.

== 308 GT4 ==
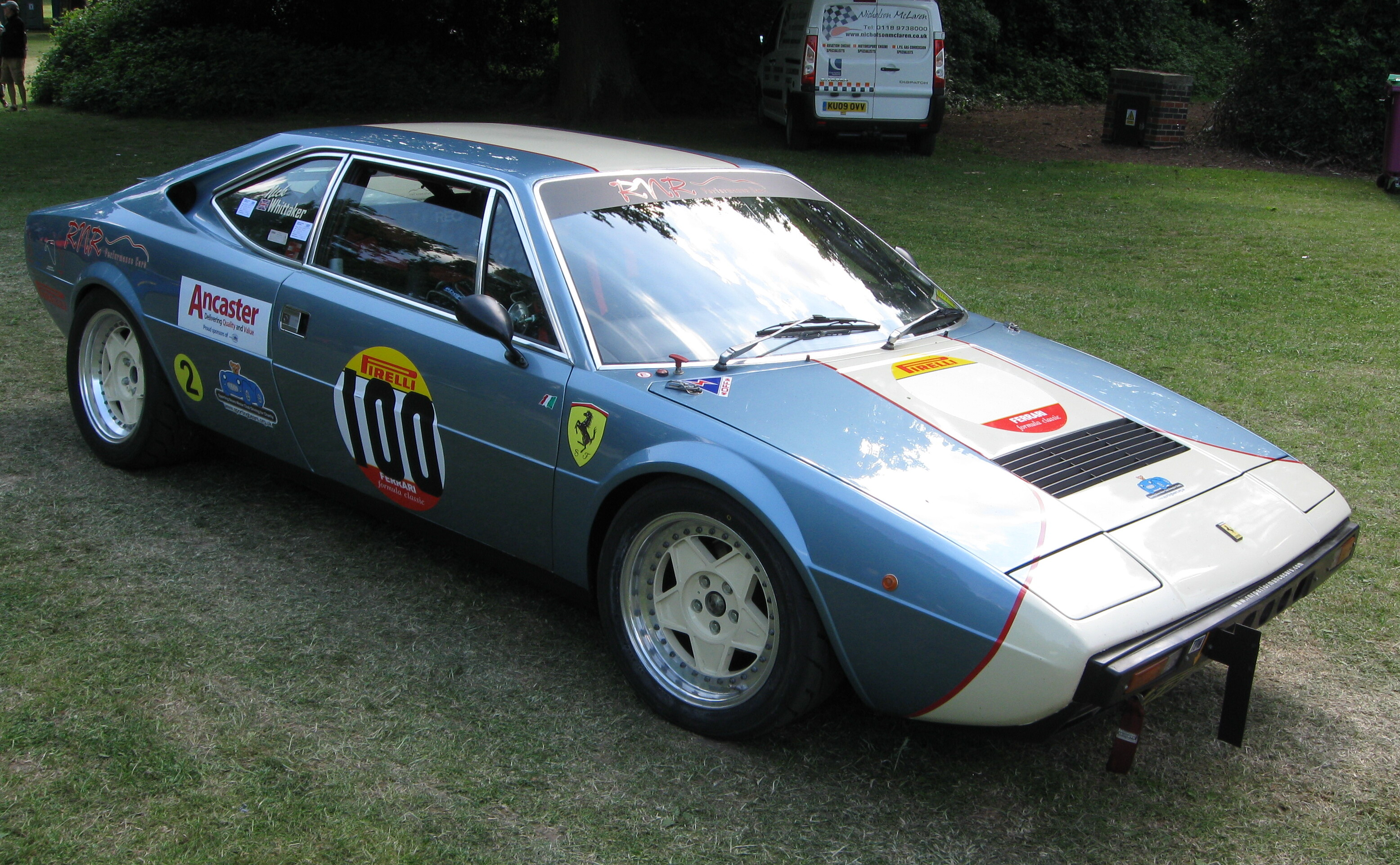
Ferrari 308 GT4 at 'Motorsport at the Palace' at Crystal Palace circuit in May 2013.

The Dino 308 GT4 was introduced at the Paris Motor Show in October 1973. Its chassis number was 07202 and it was the only example produced that year. It was painted in Azzurro Metallizzato (Light Blue Metallic).

The 308 GT4 later went on sale as a 1974 model and gained the "Prancing Horse" badge in May 1976, which replaced the Dino badges on the hood, wheels, rear panel and the steering wheel while retaining the Dino 308GT4 logo on the rear boot lid. This has caused major confusion over the years by owners, enthusiasts and judges. During the energy crisis at that time many prospective owners were hesitant to buy such an expensive automobile not badged "Ferrari", being confused at the significance of the Dino name. Dino was Enzo Ferrari's son who died in 1956, and his name was to honor his memory on the models it was placed.

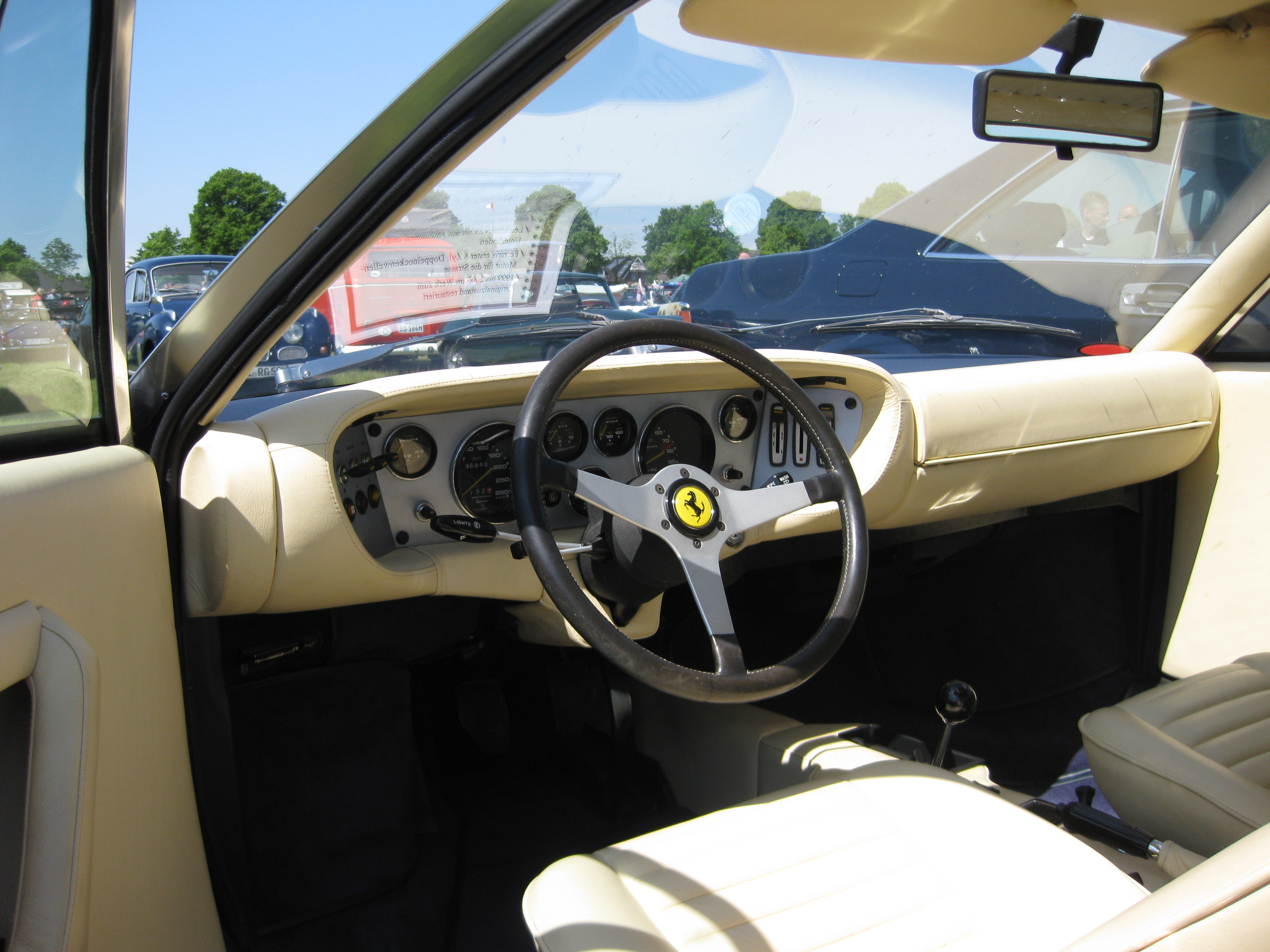
Dino 308 GT4 interior

In an effort to improve sales until the 1976 official re-badging, Ferrari sent out factory update #265/1 on July 1, 1975 with technical and cosmetic revisions in many areas. Some of these revisions were implemented piecemeal by dealers. Some made all the revisions while some just made a few. This leaves many 1975 GT4's with a variety of modifications which are hard to document as "correct" to aficionados who may not understand the complicated series of events surrounding this model year. Some of the revisions included adding Prancing Horse badges, repainting in the Boxer two-tone scheme (lower half painted matte black), air conditioning fixes, etc. It also included bumper modification and exhaust changes for North American versions. The Dino 308 GT4 was the only Ferrari legally imported to the US in 1975, and it was also the year Niki Lauda won the Formula One drivers championship and Ferrari won the constructors title. The GT4 was the only 2+2 Ferrari ever raced with factory support.

There were two series of GT4; the earlier cars featured a twin distributor engine and fog lamps mounted in the front valance. The so called Series 2 cars had a wider and shallower grille with fog lamps mounted behind, European versions changed to a single distributor while USA and Australian cars continued with twin distributors, each with 2 sets of points. On European cars Magneti Marelli electronic ignition was fitted from July 1978.

The series 2 cars had Cavallino Rampante badging on the nose and steering wheel and road wheel centres. The Dino 308GT4 logo remained on the boot/trunk lid and the Dino script continued on the instrument dials and the air vents. The revised sales brochure made no mention of Dino but was branded Ferrari. The chassis numbering sequence continued with even numbers, as started with the earlier Dinos, while the by now concurrent 308GTB/S had reverted to the traditional odd numbered chassis for road cars.

The Dino brand experiment had come to an end.

== 208 GT4 ==
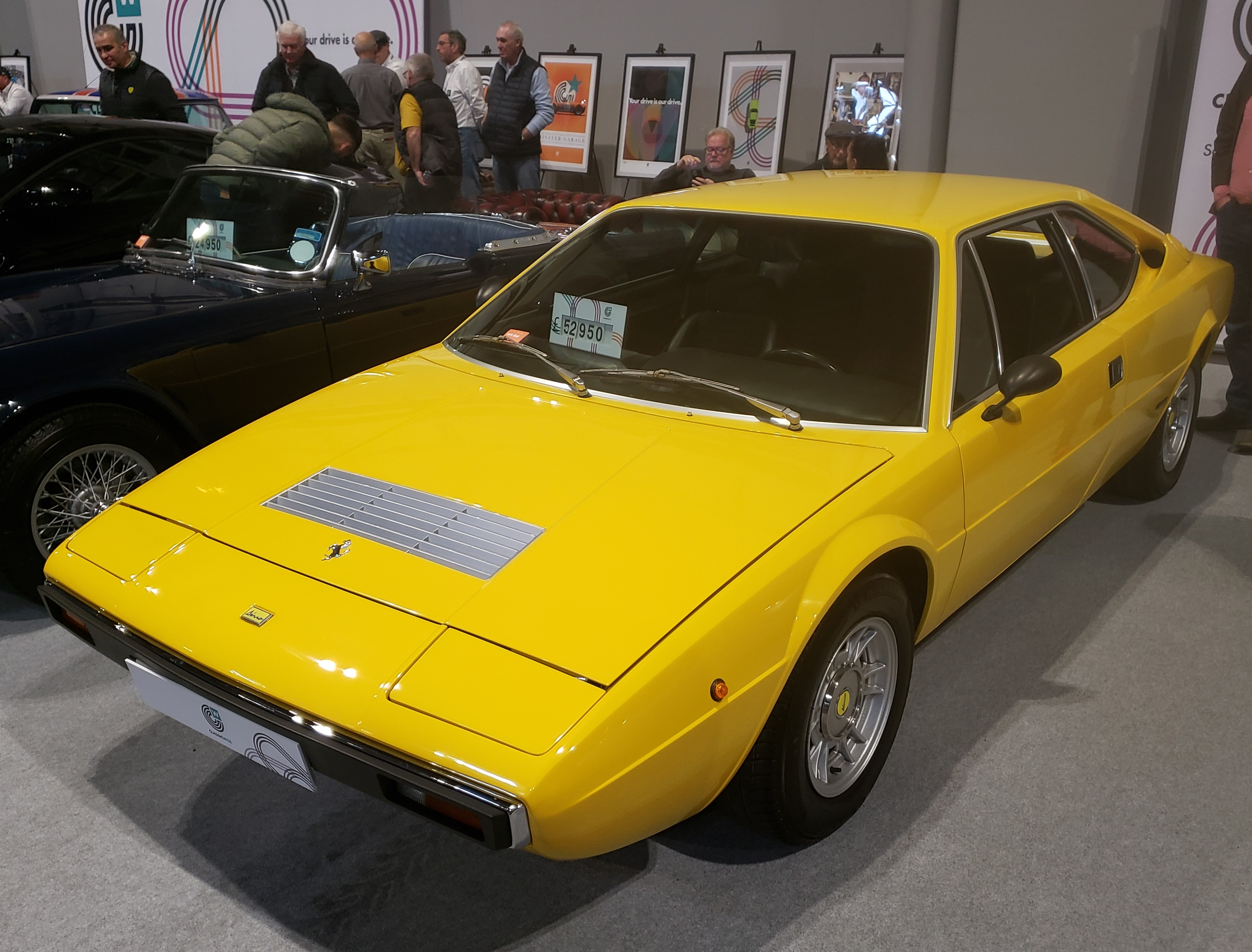
Dino 208 GT4

Introduced at the Geneva Motor Show in 1975, the 208 GT4 is a version of the GT4 with a lower displacement variant of the V8, produced for the Italian market, where cars with engines larger than two litres were subjected to more than double VAT (38%). The engine was de-bored to (66.8 by 71 mm) 2.0 L (1991 cc) V8, resulting in the smallest production V8 in history for a road car.

Power output is 170 hp (125 kW) at 7700 rpm, helping it reach a top speed of 220 km/h (137 mph). Smaller Weber 34 DCNF carburetors, a lower final drive ratio and skinnier tires completed the technical changes for the 208. Chrome (rather than black) accents outside and the lack of fog lights were external visual indicators of the smaller-engined GT4. Inside, the 208 GT4 featured a black rather than silver dash facing.

The 208 GTB replaced the 208 GT4 in 1980, after only 840 cars had been built.
