= Ferrari 12Cilindri =

Grand tourer car

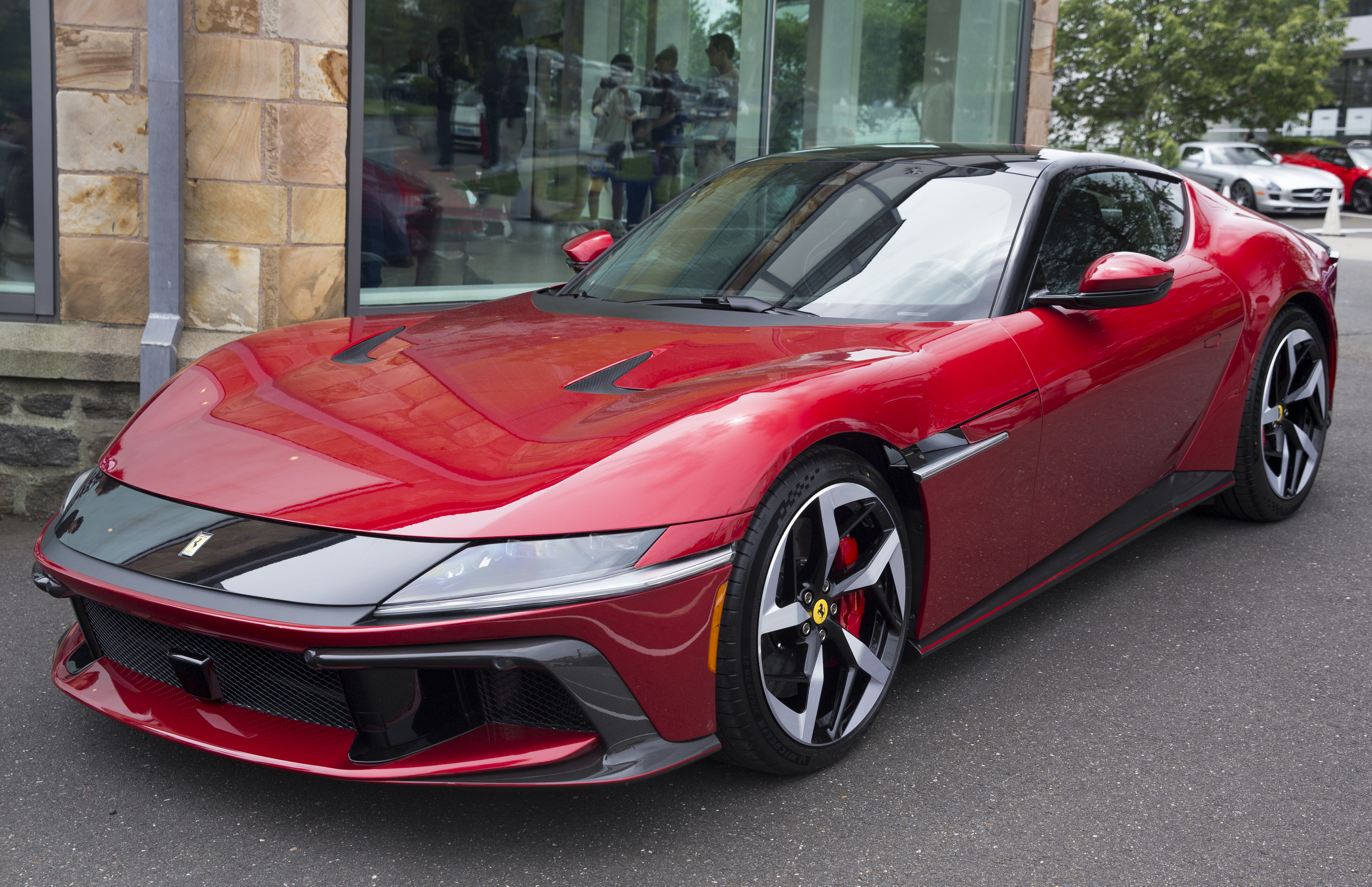

Overview
- Manufacturer: Ferrari
- Model code: Tipo F167
- Production: 2024–present
- Assembly: Italy: Maranello
- Designer: Ferrari Styling Centre under Flavio Manzoni

Body and chassis
- Class: Grand tourer (S)
- Body style: 2-door berlinetta; 2-door retractable hardtop convertible
- Layout: Front mid-engine, rear-wheel-drive

Powertrain
- Engine: 6.5 L F140 HD V12
- Power output: 830 PS (610 kW; 819 hp)
- Transmission: 8-speed Magna 8DCL900 dual-clutch 8-speed dual-clutch with simulated 6-speed manual mode (Manuale)

Dimensions
- Wheelbase: 2,700 mm (106.3 in)
- Length: 4,730 mm (186.2 in)
- Width: 2,176 mm (85.7 in)
- Height: 1,290 mm (50.8 in)
- Curb weight: 1,560 kg (3,439 lb) (dry)

Chronology
- Predecessor: Ferrari 812 Superfast

The Ferrari 12Cilindri (Type F167; "dodici cilindri", Italian pronunciation: [ˈdoːditʃi tʃiˈlindri] (Italian for 12 Cylinders); named for its engine) is a two-seater front-engine, rear-wheel-drive grand tourer produced by the Italian sports car manufacturer Ferrari. It was unveiled at Miami Beach on May 3, 2024, to coincide with the 70th anniversary of Ferrari in the American market.

The 12Cilindri was awarded the Car Design Award by ADI in 2025.

== Specifications ==
=== Engine ===
The 12Cilindri has a 6,496 cc (6.5 L) F140 V12 engine, the same used in the Ferrari 812 Competizione, and generates a power output of 830 PS (610 kW; 819 hp) at 9,250 rpm and 678 N⋅m (500 lbf⋅ft) of torque at 7,250 rpm.

=== Wheels ===
The 12Cilindri has 21-inch wheels at the front and the rear. The tires are either Michelin Pilot Sport S5 or Goodyear Eagle F1 Supersport. The brakes are (398mm/front) and (360mm/rear) and are operated by a "brake-by-wire" electronical command. The car has 4-wheel steering.

=== Aerodynamics ===
The car includes a mix of active and passive aerodynamics to improve drag coefficient values over the 812 Superfast. On the rear, the car has a spoiler to improve downforce at high speed. The side of the spoiler can tilt up to 10° at 60 km/h (38 mph) to act as aero brake and generating 50 kg of downforce at high speeds.

=== Performance ===
Ferrari claims a 0–100 km/h (0–62 mph) in 2.9 seconds, a 0–200 km/h (0–124 mph) in 7.9 seconds, and a top speed of 340 km/h (211 mph).

== Design ==
The design is a tribute of the Ferrari 365 GTB/4 Daytona with the black band on the hood that cannot be removed or changed to a different color.

The interior is inspired by the Purosangue and the 296 GTB and is the first GT-segment Ferrari to lack an analog gauge.

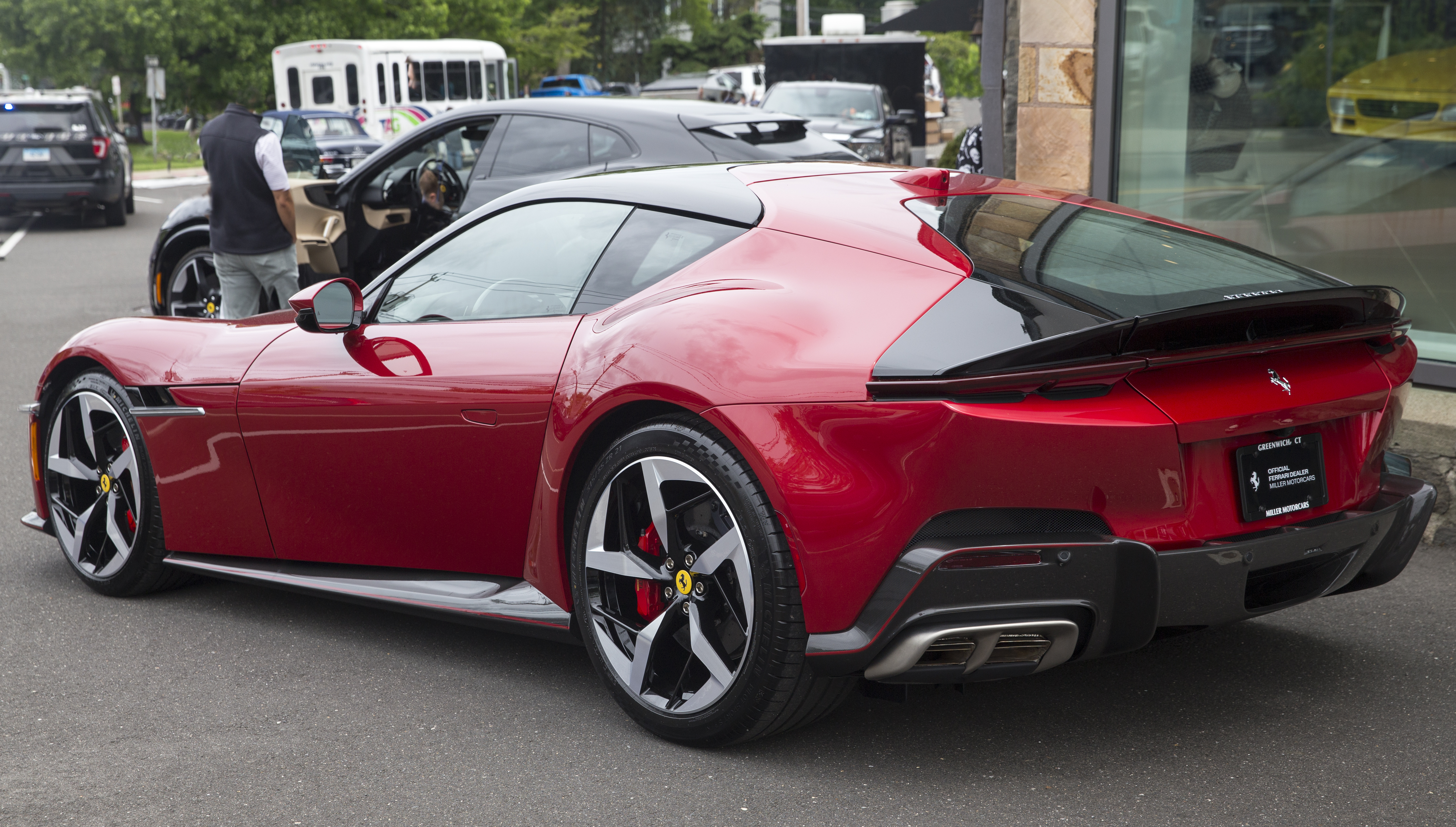
Rear view

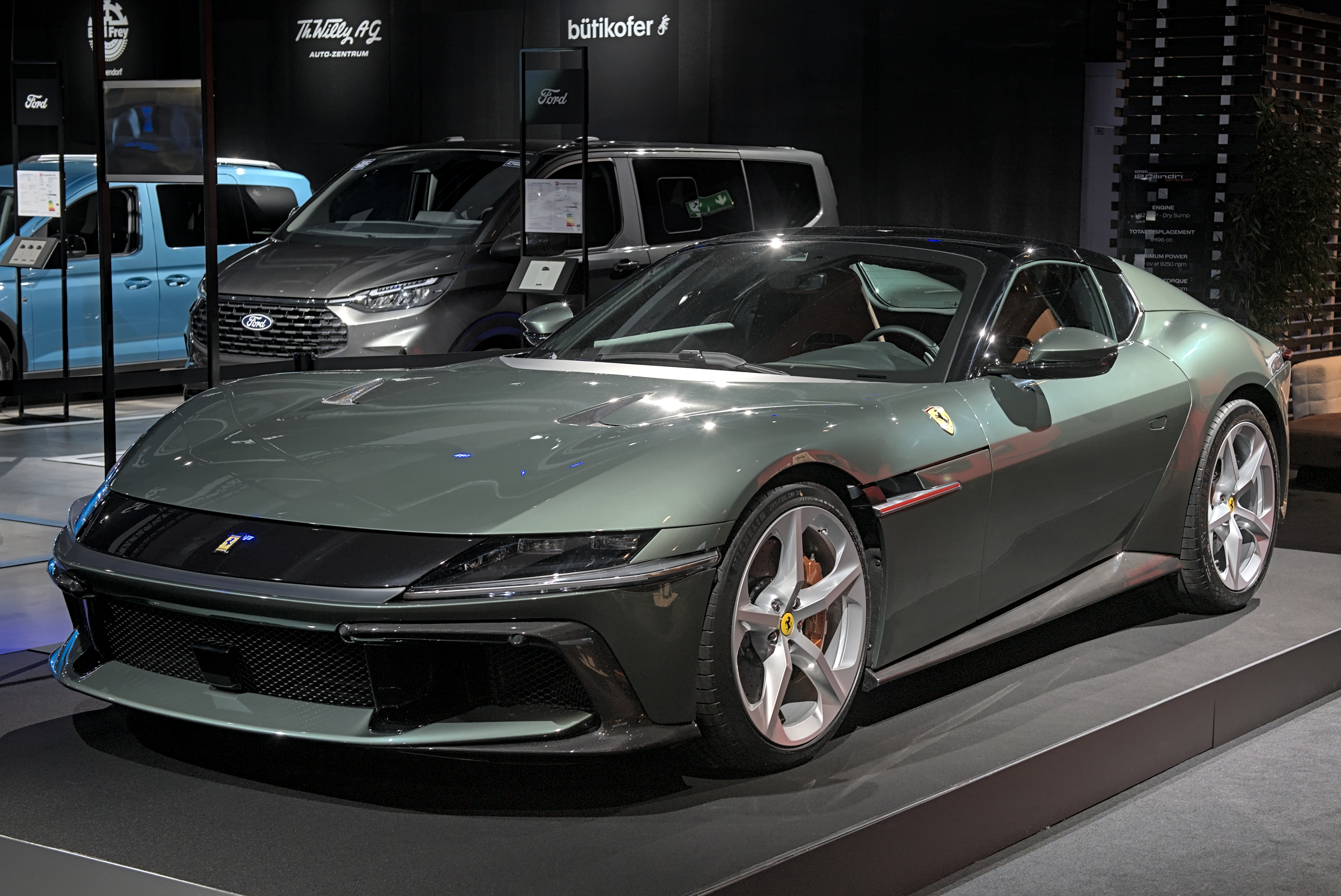
Ferrari 12Cilindri Spider

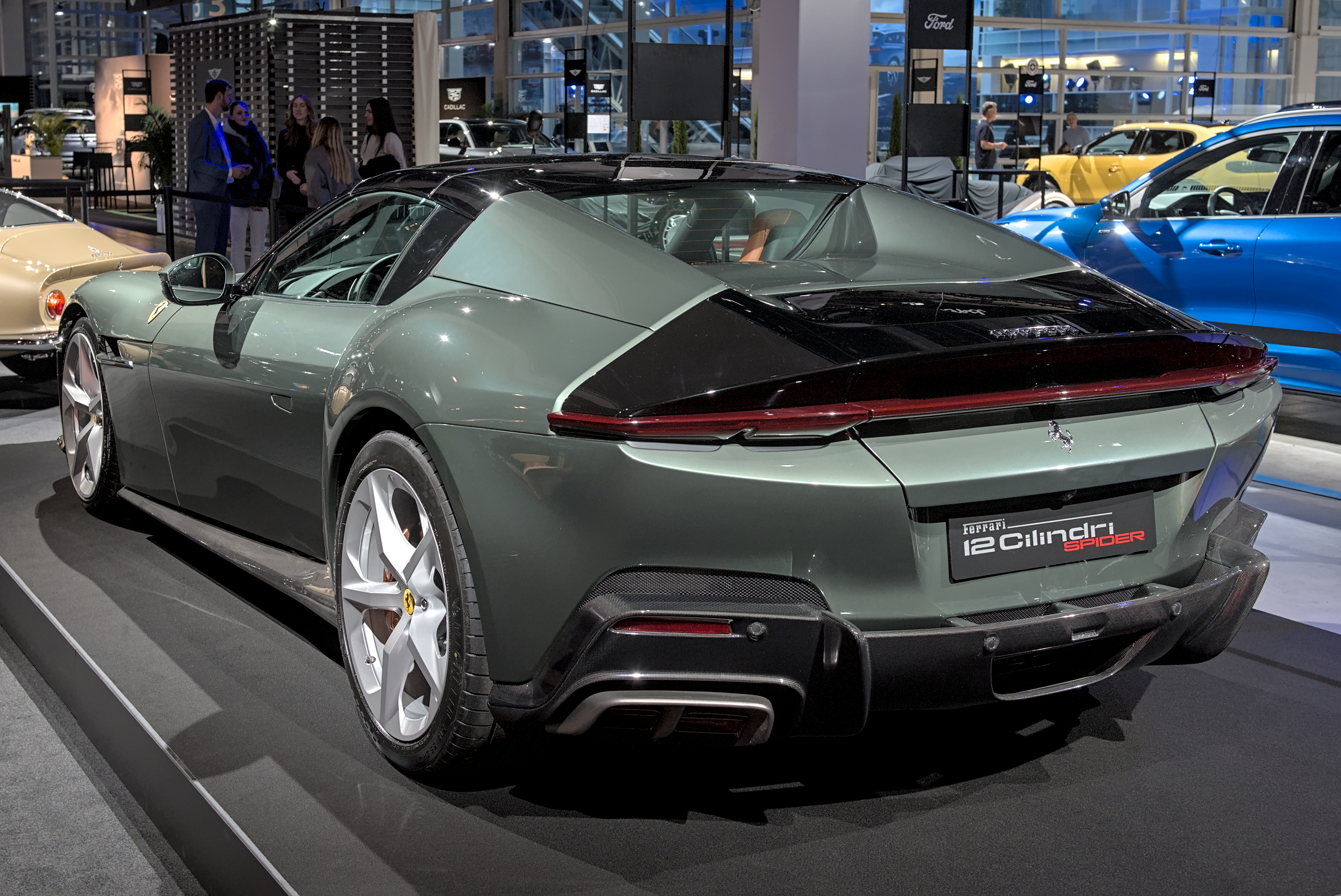
Rear view

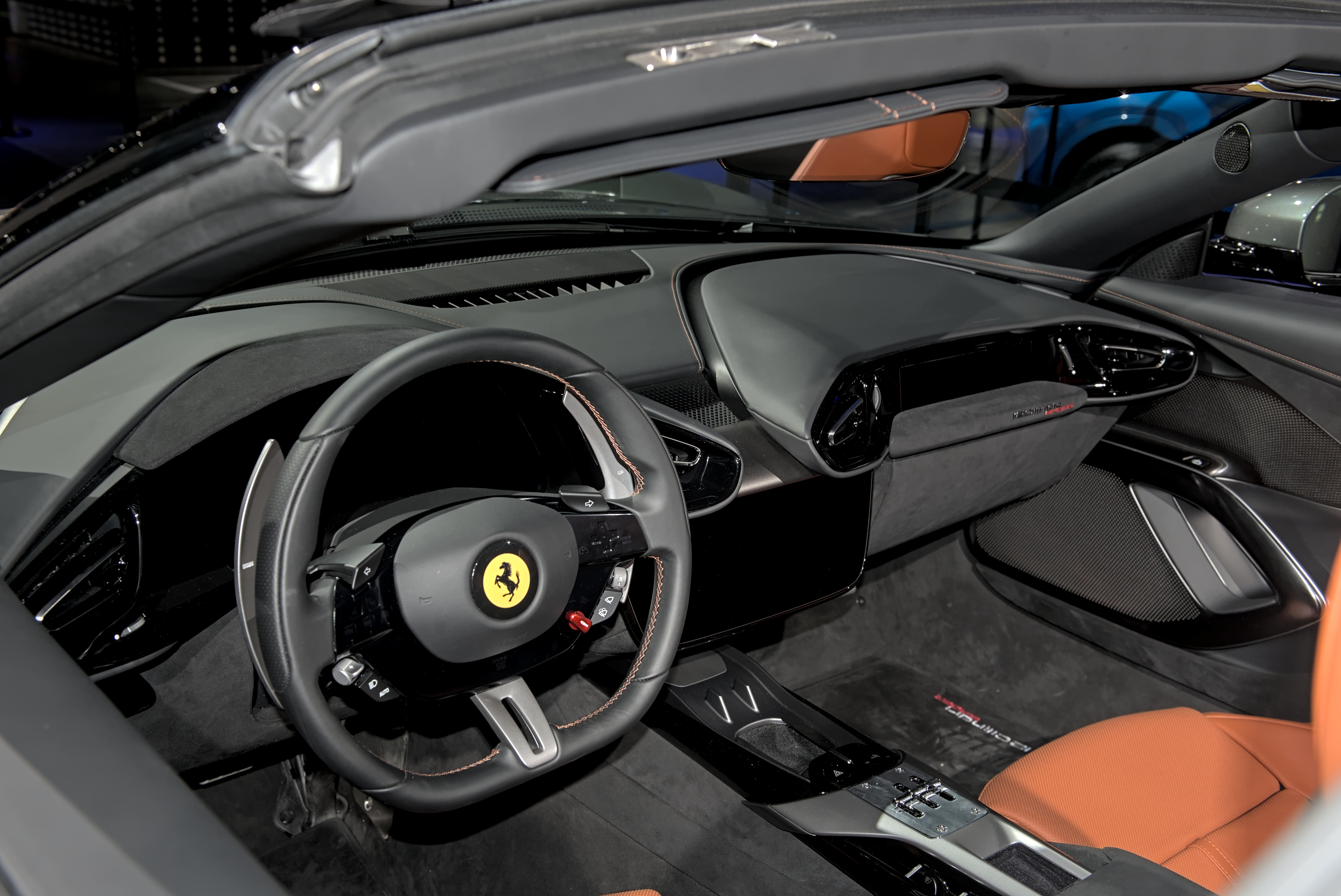
Interior

== 12Cilindri Manuale ==
The Ferrari 12Cilindri Manuale is a limited-run (1,499 units planned) special edition introduced in July 2026. It marks the return of the open-gate shifter and three-pedal setup to Maranello for the first time since 2012.

Instead of using a traditional vintage mechanical linkage, Ferrari engineered a "Manual By-Wire" system. Underneath, it retains the modern 8-speed Dual-Clutch Transmission (DCT) from the standard car but uses digital actuators to simulate the dynamic feel, mechanical weight, and engagement of a classic manual.

A similar simulation of a manual gearbox has been used before in the Koenigsegg CC850.
