= Ferrari F140 engine =

F140
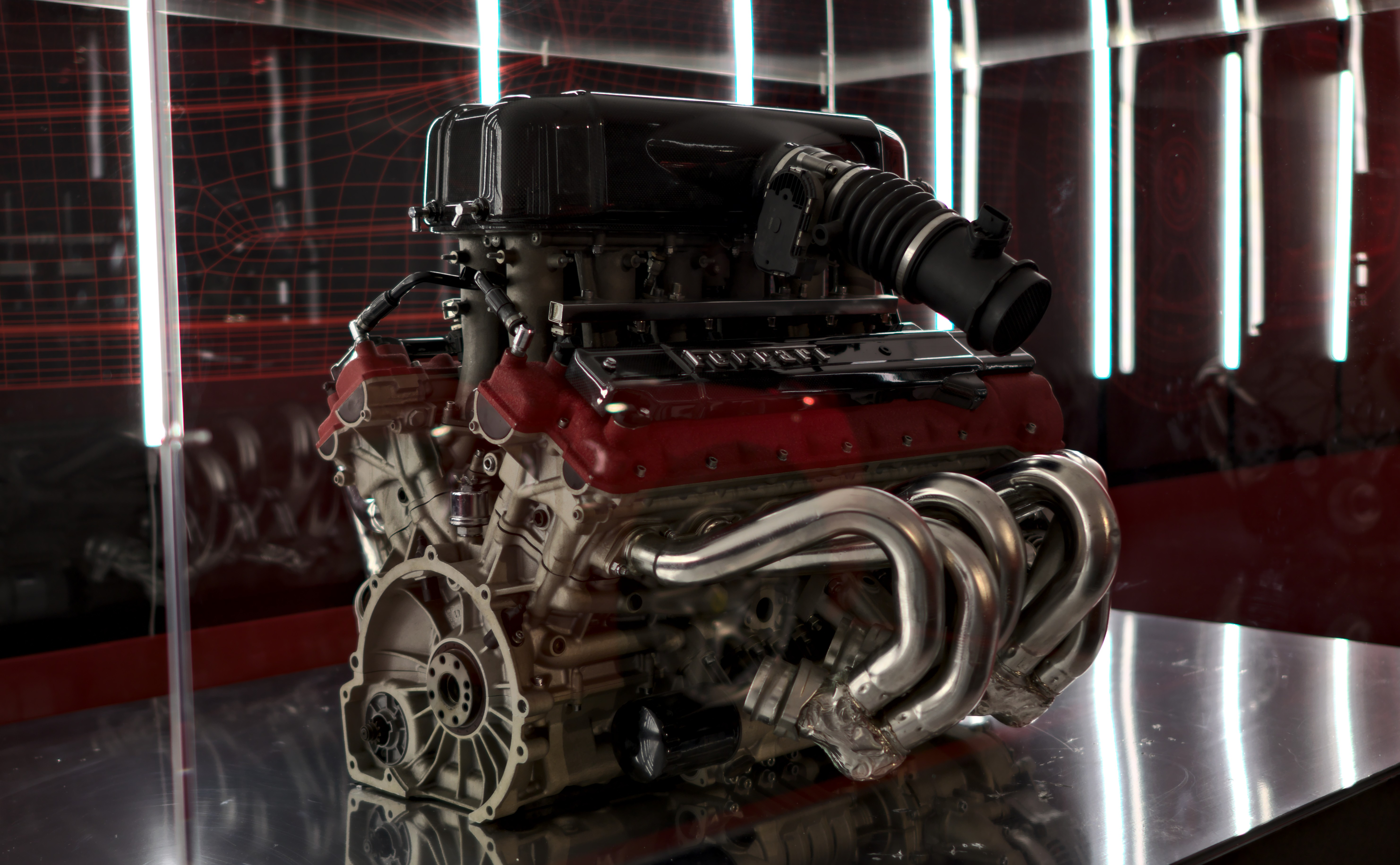
- Tipo F140 B engine

Overview
- Manufacturer: Ferrari
- Also called: Ferrari/Maserati V12
- Production: 2002–present

Layout
- Configuration: 65° V12
- Displacement: 6.0 L (5,999 cc); 6.3 L (6,262 cc); 6.5 L (6,495 cc)
- Cylinder bore: 92 mm (3.6 in); 94 mm (3.7 in)
- Piston stroke: 75.2 mm (3.0 in); 78 mm (3.1 in)
- Cylinder block material: Aluminium
- Cylinder head material: Aluminium
- Valvetrain: DOHC

Combustion
- Fuel system: Fuel injection; Direct fuel injection
- Fuel type: Petrol
- Cooling system: Water cooled

Chronology
- Predecessor: Ferrari F133 engine

The F140 engine family is a series of 65° DOHC V12 petrol engines produced by Ferrari since 2002, and used in both Ferrari and Maserati cars. In the Ferrari Enzo, it set the record for the most powerful naturally aspirated engine in a road car. The 5998.8 cc engine, designed for the Enzo, is known within Ferrari as the Tipo F140B, whereas the very similar Tipo F140C engine displaces 5998.8 cc and was designed for the 599 as the most powerful series-production Ferrari engine, a trend that has continued with the F12 and 812. This engine is also used in Maserati Birdcage 75th. For Tipo F140EB displacement was enlarged to 6262.456 cc and debuted in FF. The latest enlargement is the Tipo F140GA at 6495.6 cc used in the Ferrari 12Cilindri.

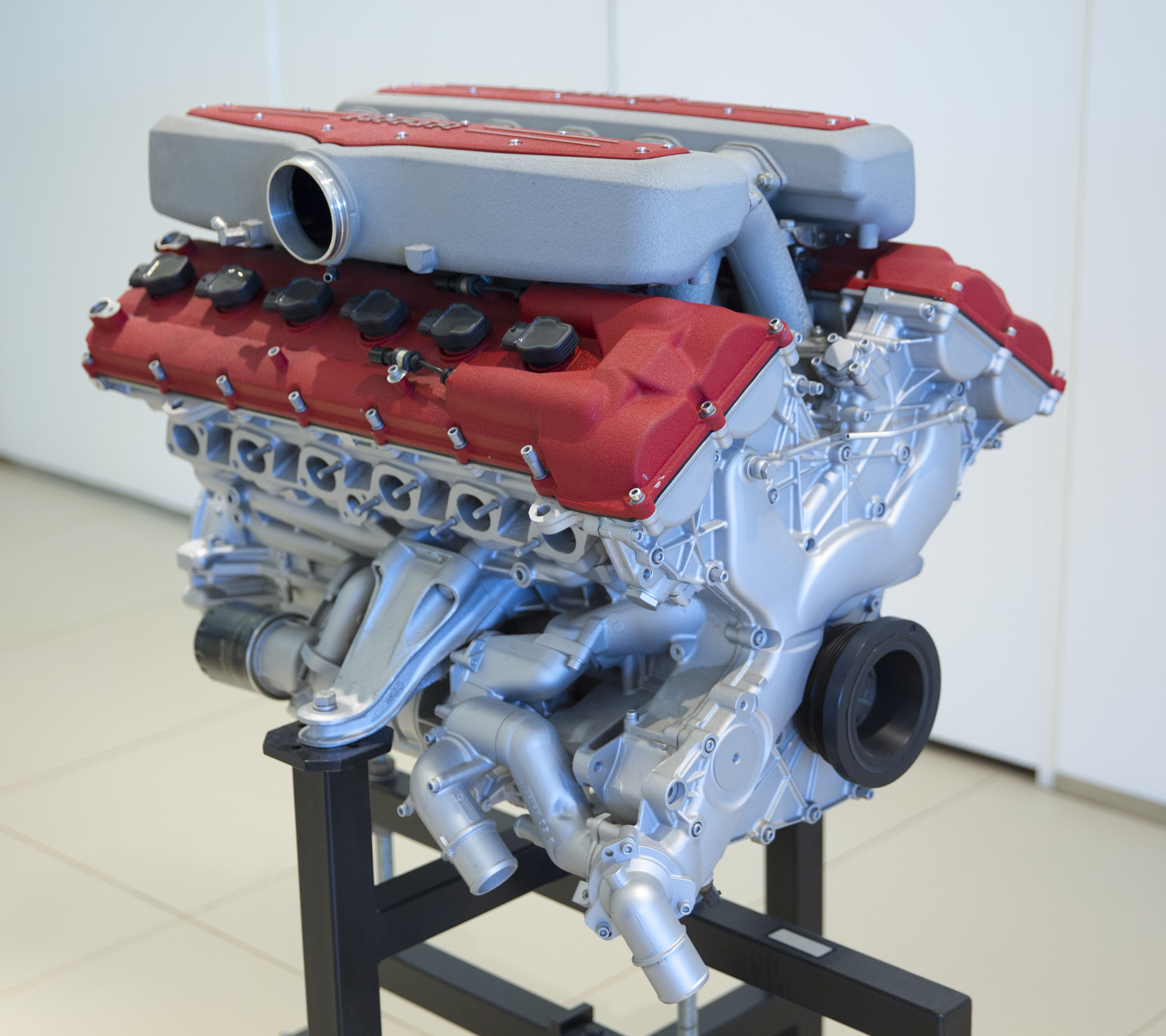
Tipo F140 C engine

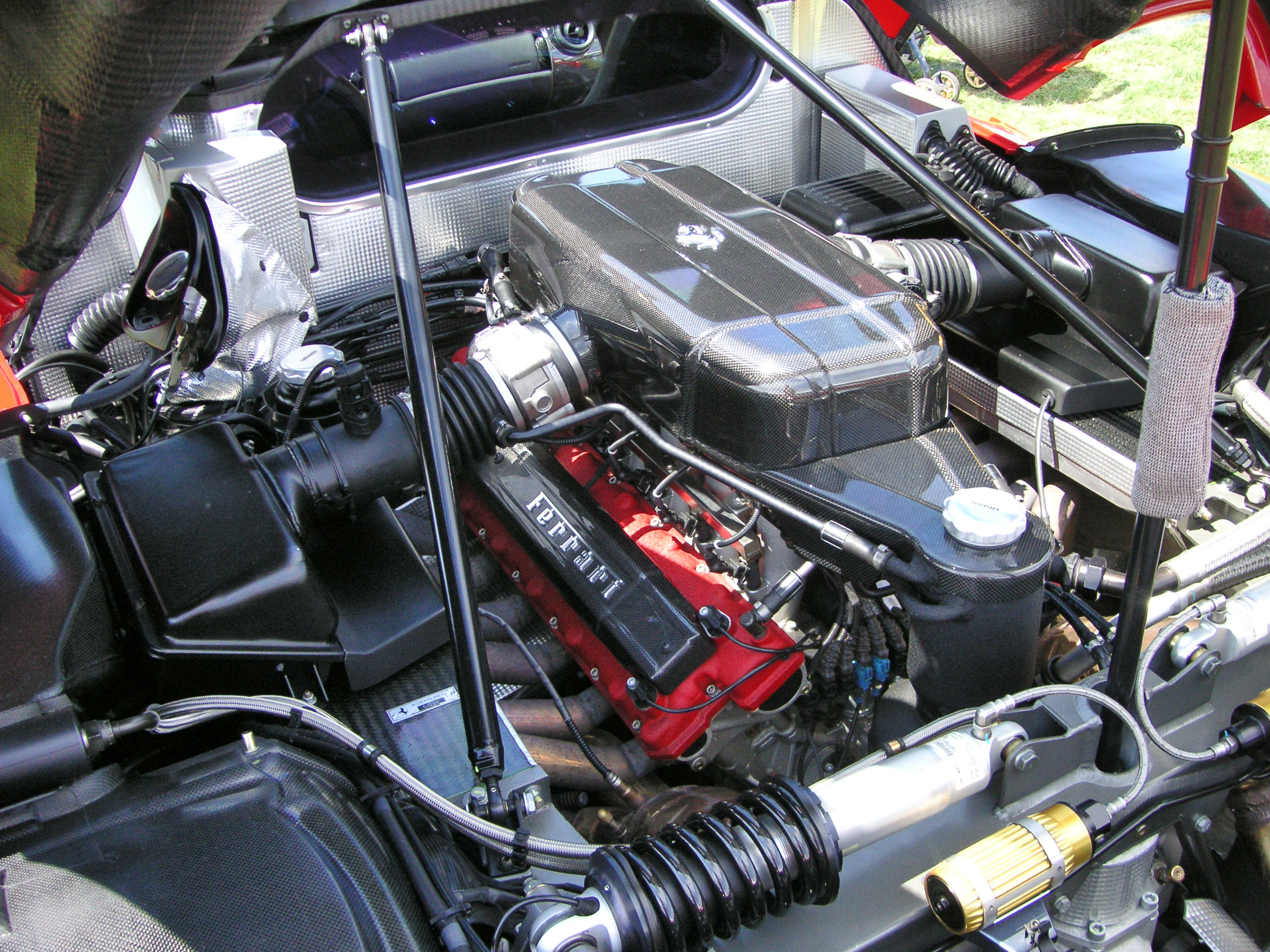
The earliest example of the F140 family, an F140 B engine in a Ferrari Enzo

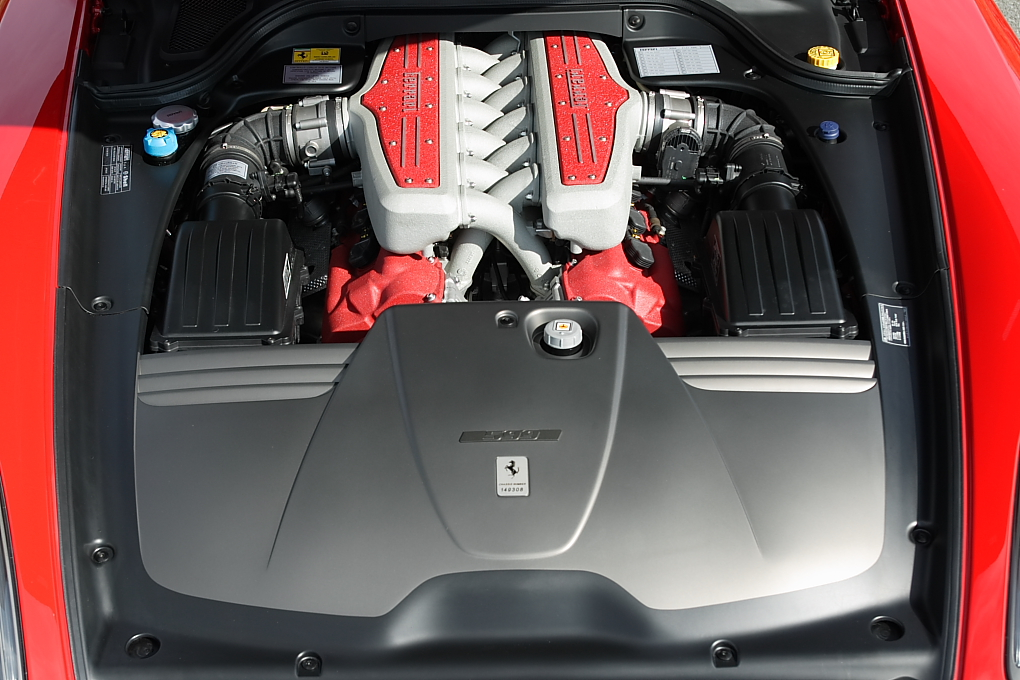
F140 C engine in a Ferrari 599

== Applications ==
=== Ferrari usage ===
Tipo F140C
Ferrari 599 HGTE at Goodwood Festival of Speed 2009

==== Road engines ====
Eng. code	Displ.	Bore × stroke	Years	Usage	Peak power	Peak torque
F140 B	6.0 L (5,999 cc)	92.0 mm × 75.2 mm (3.62 in × 2.96 in) 0.5 L (499.9 cc) per cylinder	2002–2004	Ferrari Enzo	660 PS (485 kW; 651 hp) at 7800 rpm	657 N⋅m (485 lbf⋅ft) at 5500 rpm
F140 C	6.0 L (5,999 cc)	92.0 mm × 75.2 mm (3.62 in × 2.96 in) 0.5 L (499.9 cc) per cylinder	2006–2012	Ferrari 599 GTB Fiorano	620 PS (456 kW; 612 hp) at 7600 rpm	608 N⋅m (448 lbf⋅ft) at 5600 rpm
F140 AD	6.0 L (5,999 cc)	92.0 mm × 75.2 mm (3.62 in × 2.96 in) 0.5 L (499.9 cc) per cylinder	2010–2012	Ferrari 599 GTO	670 PS (493 kW; 661 hp) at 8250 rpm	620 N⋅m (457 lbf⋅ft) at 6500 rpm
F140 EB	6.3 L (6,262 cc)	94.0 mm × 75.2 mm (3.70 in × 2.96 in) 0.5 L (521.87 cc) per cylinder	2011–2016	Ferrari FF	660 PS (485 kW; 651 hp) at 8000 rpm	682 N⋅m (503 lbf⋅ft) at 6000 rpm
F140 FC	6.3 L (6,262 cc)	94.0 mm × 75.2 mm (3.70 in × 2.96 in) 0.5 L (521.87 cc) per cylinder	2012–2016	Ferrari F12berlinetta	740 PS (544 kW; 730 hp) at 8250 rpm	690 N⋅m (509 lbf⋅ft) at 6000 rpm
F140 FC	6.3 L (6,262 cc)	94.0 mm × 75.2 mm (3.70 in × 2.96 in) 0.5 L (521.87 cc) per cylinder	2019	Apollo Intensa Emozione	791 PS (582 kW; 780 hp) at 8,500 rpm	760 N⋅m (561 lbf⋅ft) at 6,000 rpm
F140 FE	6.3 L (6,262 cc)	94.0 mm × 75.2 mm (3.70 in × 2.96 in) 0.5 L (521.87 cc) per cylinder	2013–2015	LaFerrari; LaFerrari Aperta	800 PS (588 kW; 789 hp) at 9000 rpm + 163 PS (120 kW; 161 hp) from KERS total 963 PS (708 kW; 950 hp) at 9000 rpm	700 N⋅m (516 lbf⋅ft) at 6750 rpm + over 200 N⋅m (148 lbf⋅ft) from KERS total 900 N⋅m (664 lbf⋅ft) at 6750 rpm
F140 FG	6.3 L (6,262 cc)	94.0 mm × 75.2 mm (3.70 in × 2.96 in) 0.5 L (521.87 cc) per cylinder	2015–2016	Ferrari F12tdf	780 PS (574 kW; 769 hp) at 8500 rpm	705 N⋅m (520 lbf⋅ft) at 6750 rpm
F140 ED	6.3 L (6,262 cc)	94.0 mm × 75.2 mm (3.70 in × 2.96 in) 0.5 L (521.87 cc) per cylinder	2016–2020	Ferrari GTC4Lusso	690 PS (507 kW; 681 hp) at 8000 rpm	700 N⋅m (516 lbf⋅ft) at 5750 rpm
F140 GA	6.5 L (6,496 cc)	94.0 mm × 78.0 mm (3.70 in × 3.07 in) 0.5 L (541.30 cc) per cylinder	2017–2024	Ferrari 812 Superfast; Ferrari 812 GTS	800 PS (588 kW; 789 hp) at 8500 rpm	718 N⋅m (530 lbf⋅ft) at 6750 rpm
F140 GC	6.5 L (6,496 cc)	94.0 mm × 78.0 mm (3.70 in × 3.07 in) 0.5 L (541.30 cc) per cylinder	2018–2023	Ferrari Monza SP1/SP2	810 PS (596 kW; 799 hp) at 8500 rpm	719 N⋅m (530 lbf⋅ft) at 6750 rpm
F140 HB	6.5 L (6,496 cc)	94.0 mm × 78.0 mm (3.70 in × 3.07 in) 0.5 L (541.30 cc) per cylinder	2021–2024	Ferrari 812 Competizione /Competizione A	830 PS (610 kW; 819 hp) at 9250 rpm	692 N⋅m (510 lbf⋅ft) at 7000 rpm
F140 HC	6.5 L (6,496 cc)	94.0 mm × 78.0 mm (3.70 in × 3.07 in) 0.5 L (541.30 cc) per cylinder	2022–present	Ferrari Daytona SP3	840 PS (618 kW; 829 hp) at 9250 rpm	697 N⋅m (514 lbf⋅ft) at 7250 rpm
F140 IA	6.5 L (6,496 cc)	94.0 mm × 78.0 mm (3.70 in × 3.07 in) 0.5 L (541.30 cc) per cylinder	2023–present	Ferrari Purosangue	725 PS (533 kW; 715 hp) at 7750 rpm	716 N⋅m (528 lbf⋅ft) at 6250 rpm
F140 HD	6.5 L (6,496 cc)	94.0 mm × 78.0 mm (3.70 in × 3.07 in) 0.5 L (541.30 cc) per cylinder	2024–present	Ferrari 12Cilindri	830 PS (610 kW; 819 hp) at 9250 rpm	678 N⋅m (500 lbf⋅ft) at 7250 rpm

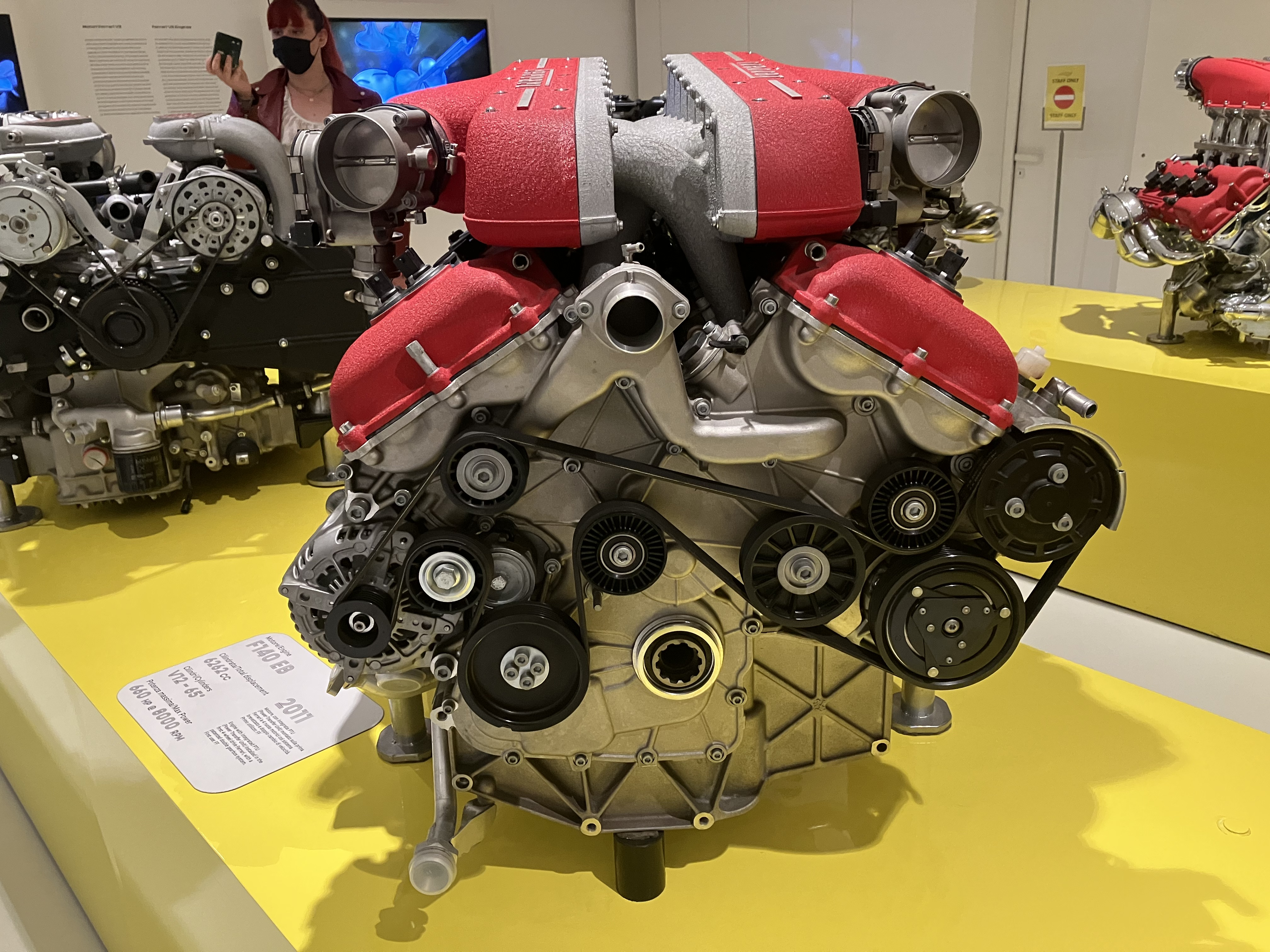
F140 EB at the Museo Casa Enzo Ferrari

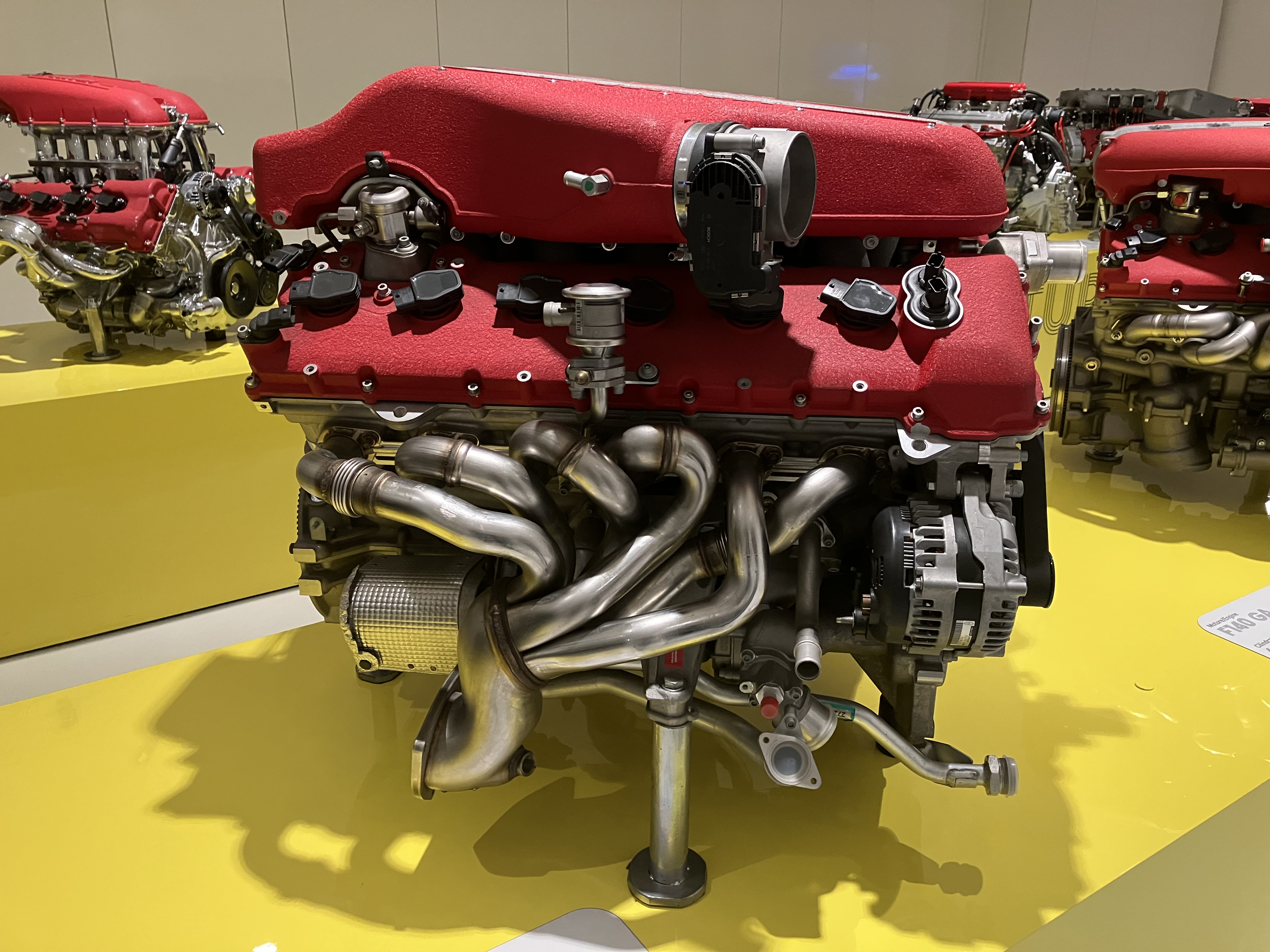

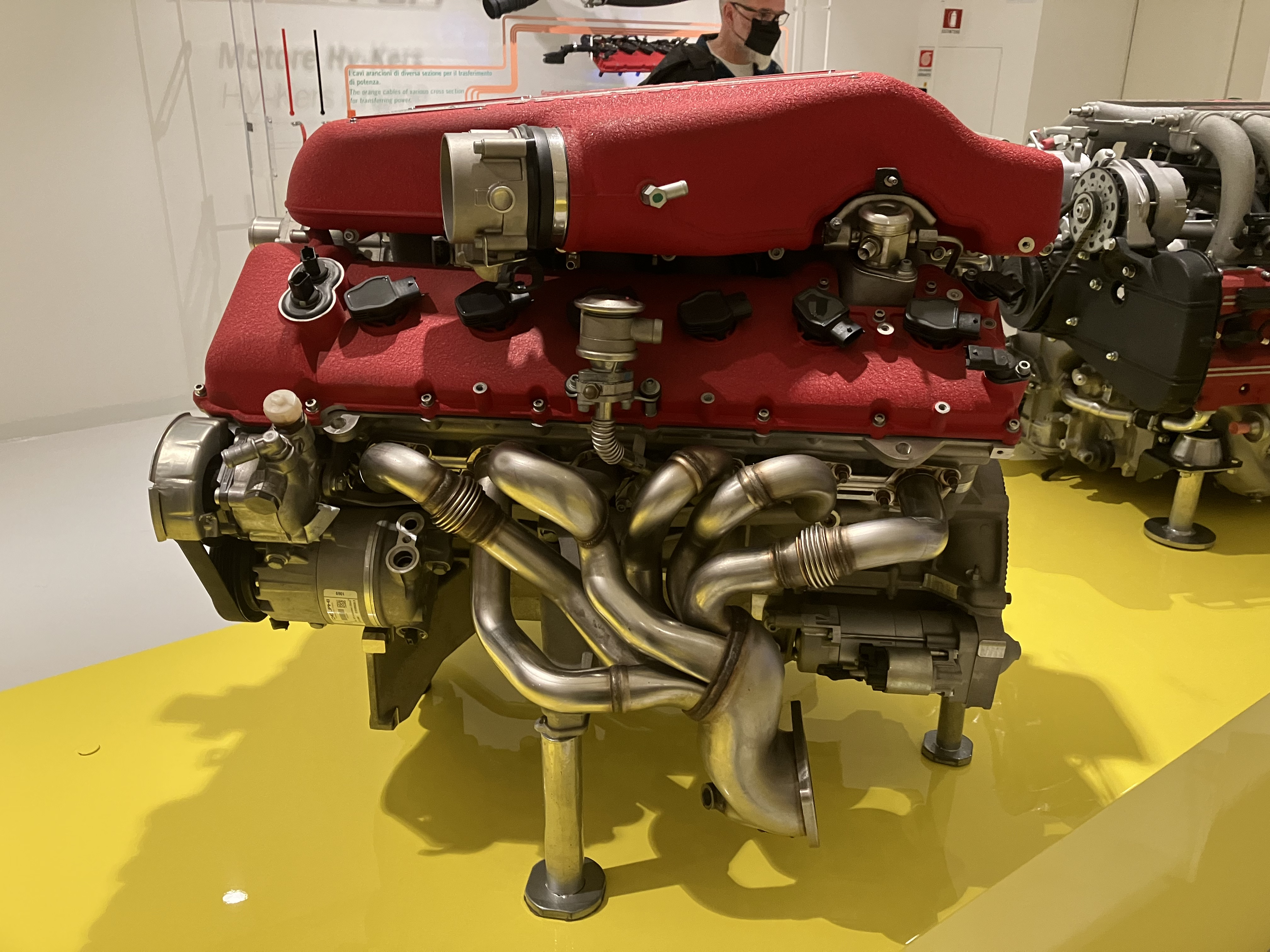

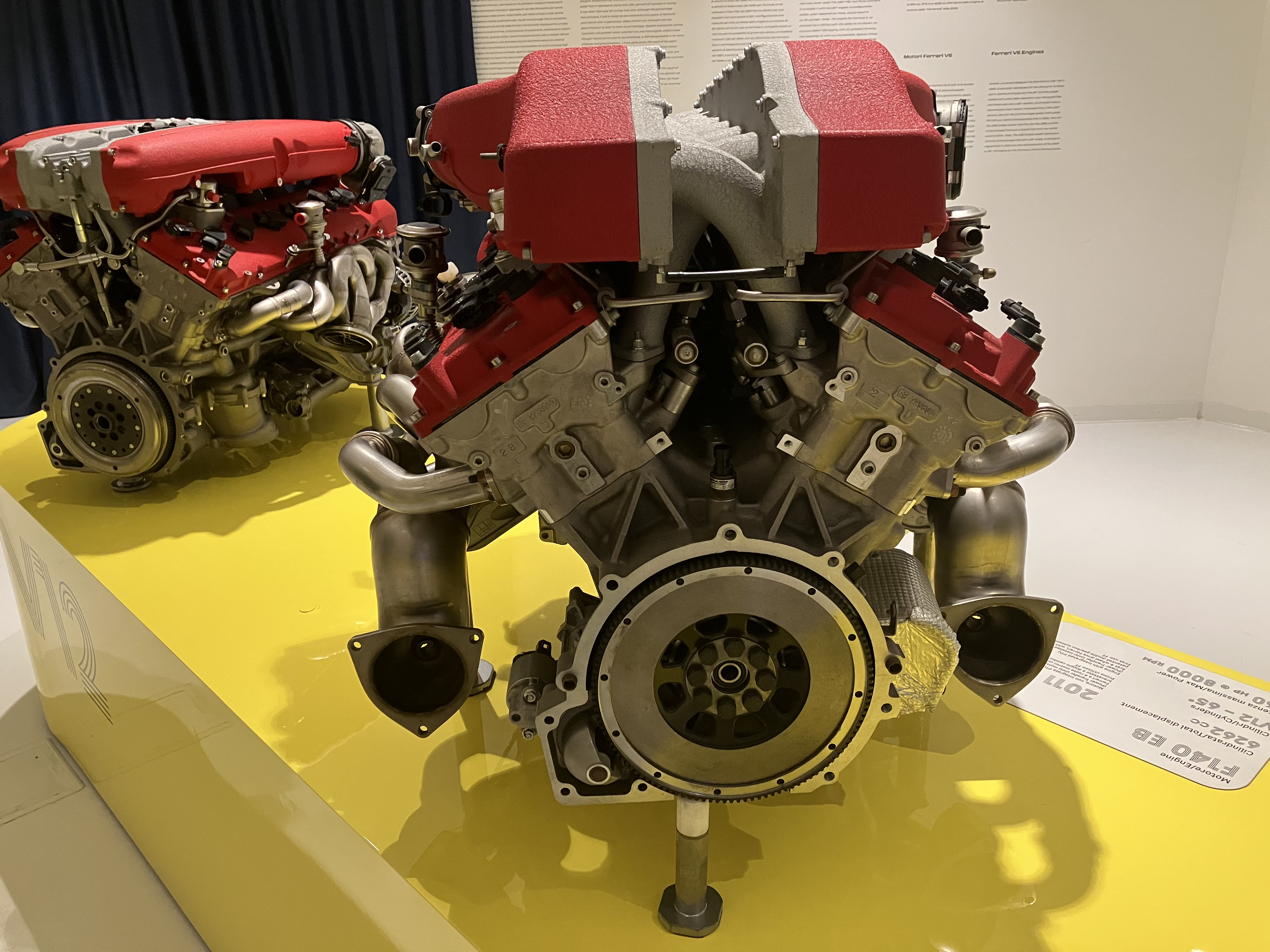

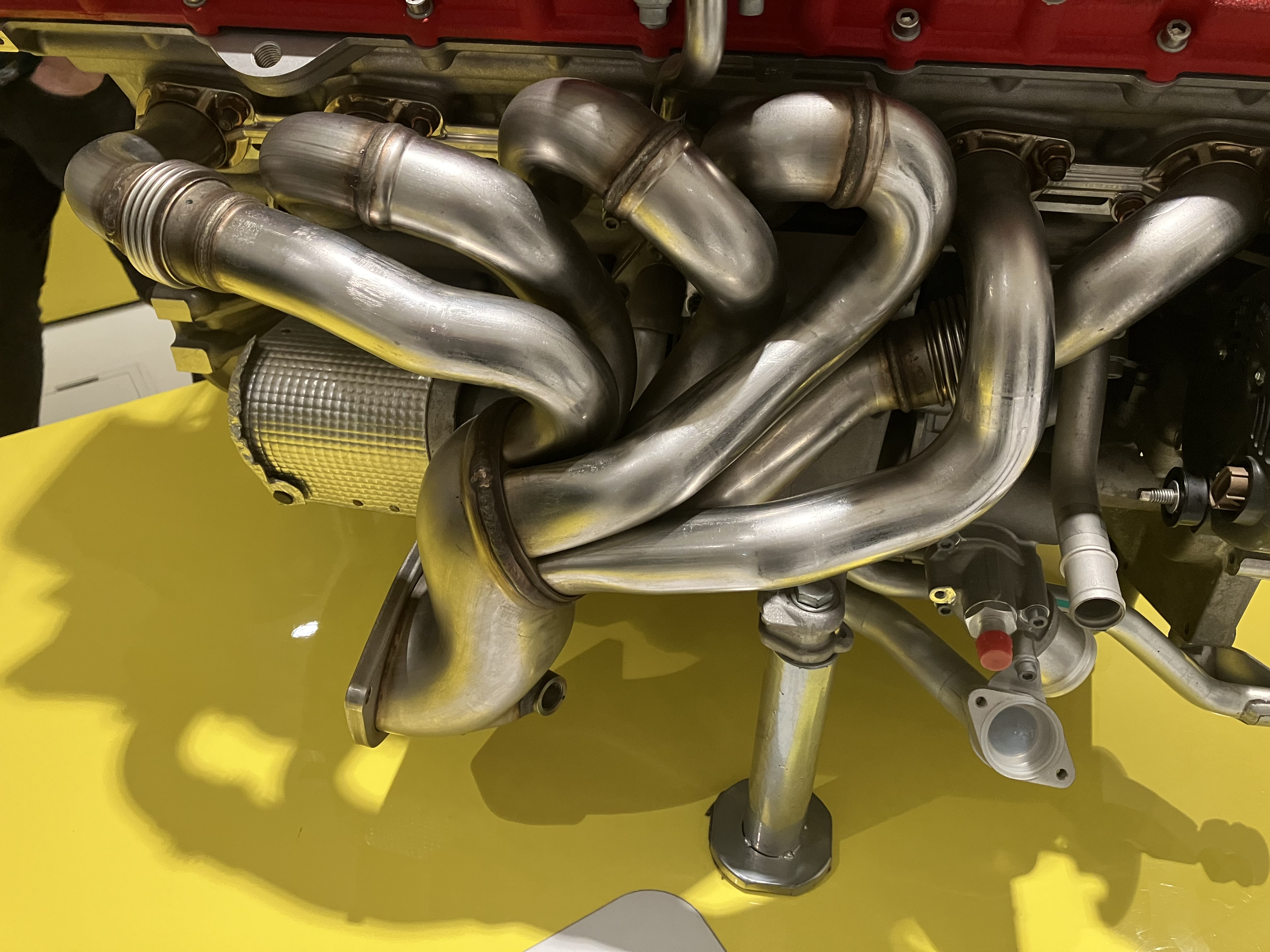
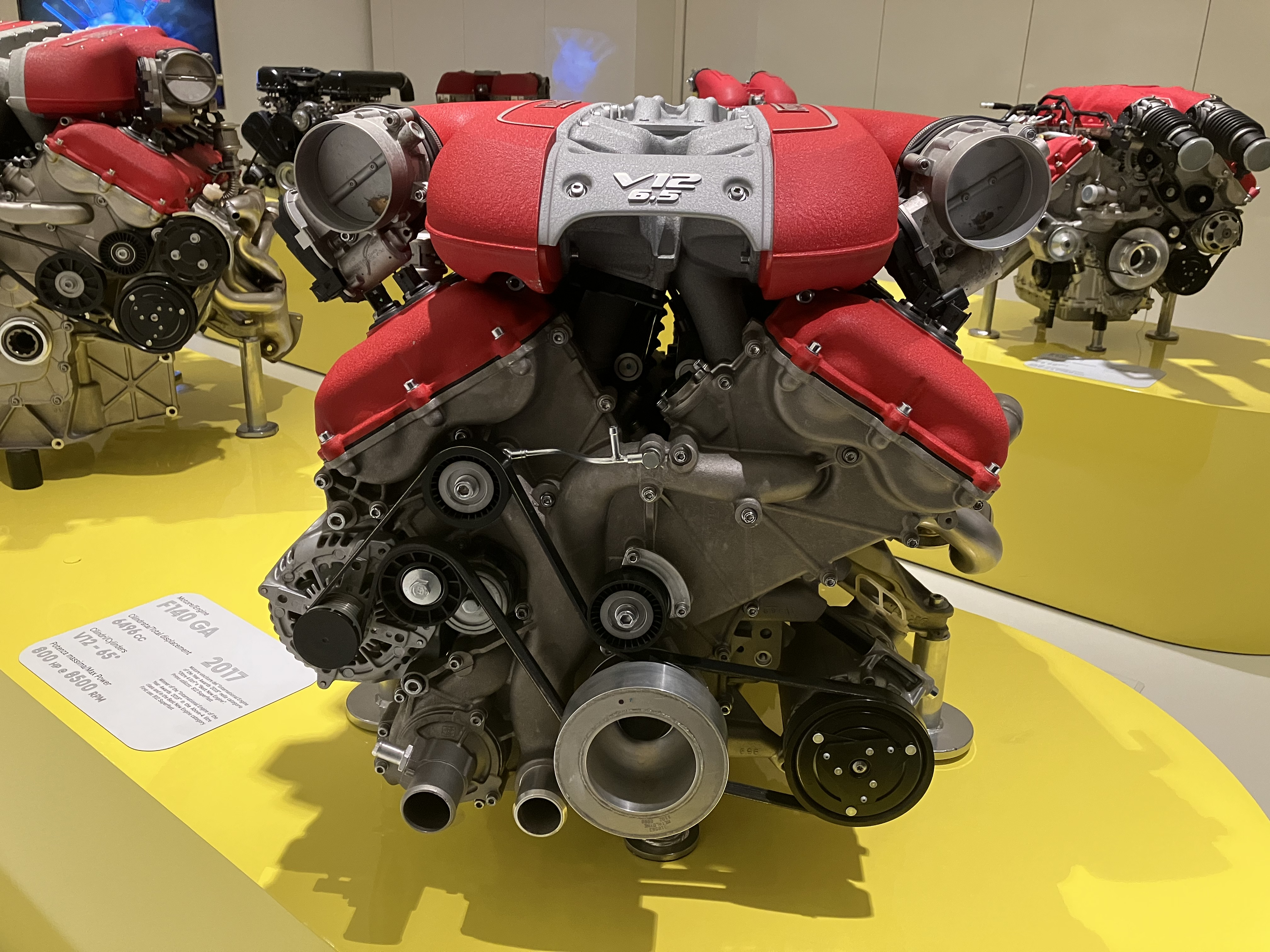
F140 GA at the Museo Casa Enzo Ferrari

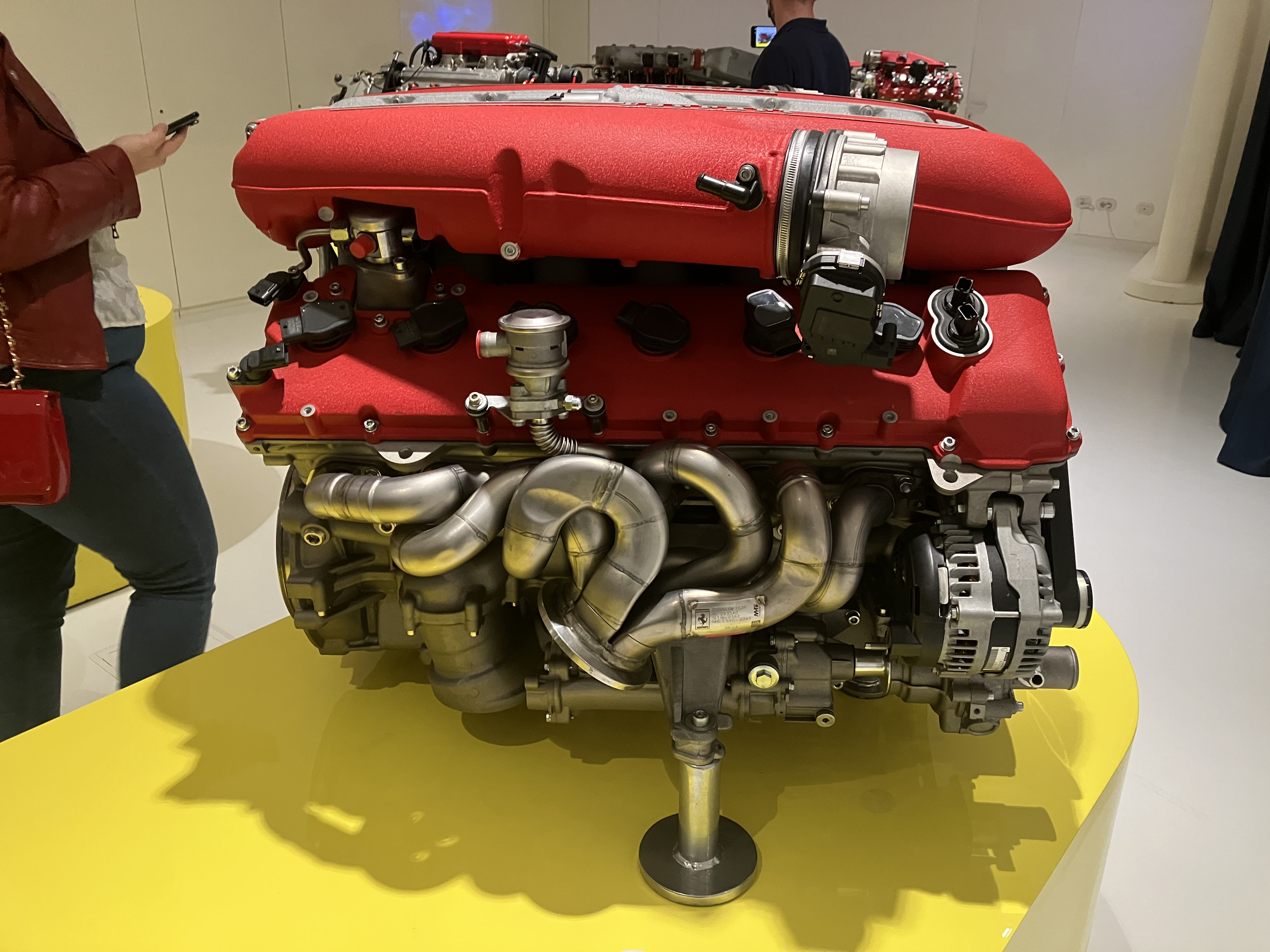

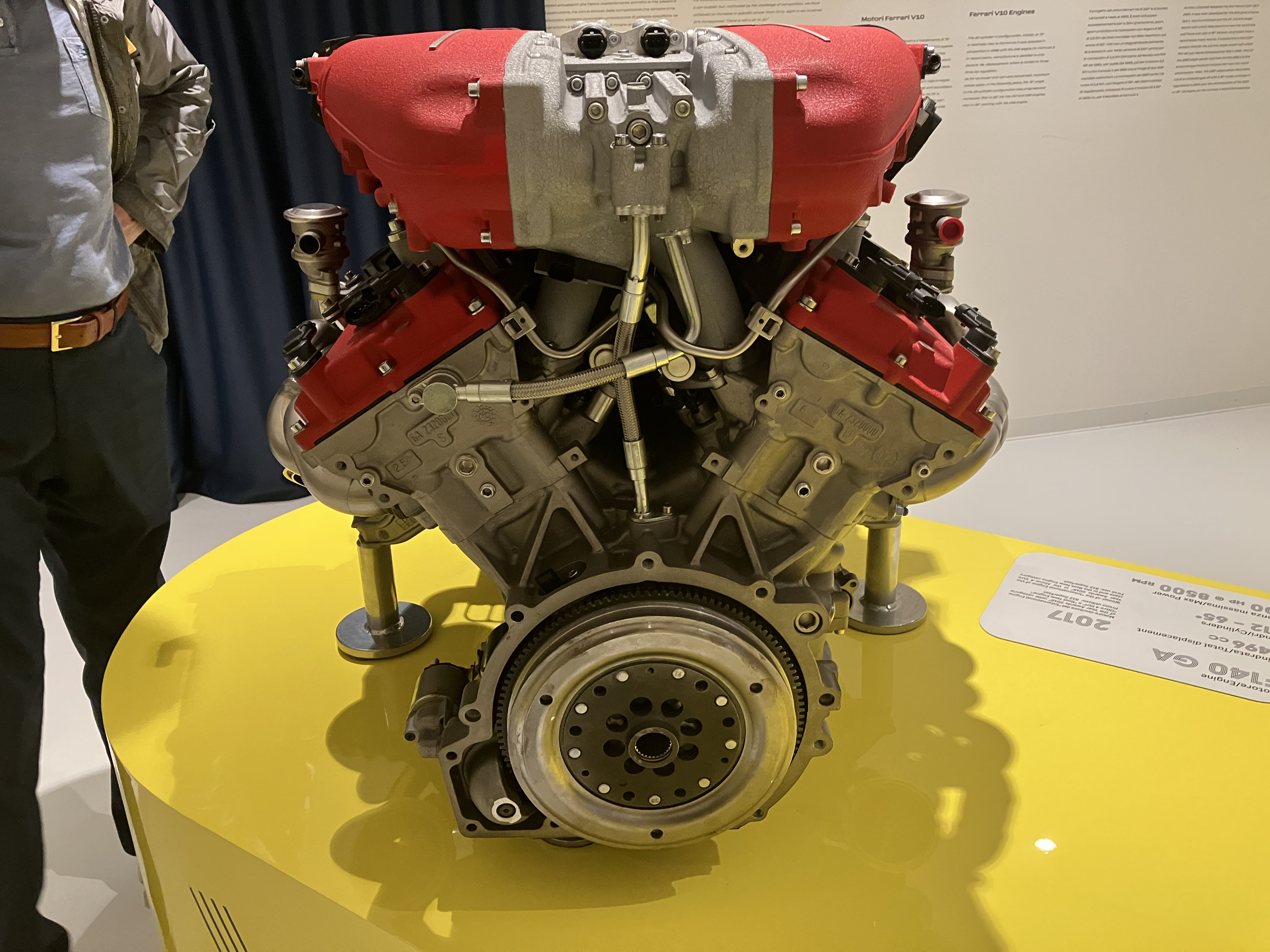

==== Racing engines ====
Eng. code	Displacement	Bore × stroke	Years	Usage	Power	torque
F140 DA	6.3 L (6,262 cc)	94.0 mm × 75.2 mm (3.70 in × 2.96 in)	2005–2006	Ferrari FXX	800 PS (588 kW; 789 hp) at 8500 rpm	686 N⋅m (70.0 kg⋅m) at 5750 rpm
F140 DA	6.3 L (6,262 cc)	94.0 mm × 75.2 mm (3.70 in × 2.96 in)	2007–2008	Ferrari FXX Evoluzione	860 PS (633 kW; 848 hp) at 9500 rpm	690 N⋅m (70 kg⋅m) at 5750 rpm
F140 CF	6.0 L (5,999 cc)	92.0 mm × 75.2 mm (3.62 in × 2.96 in)	2009–2010	Ferrari 599XX	730 PS (537 kW; 720 hp) at 9000 rpm	686 N⋅m (70.0 kg⋅m)
F140 CF	6.0 L (5,999 cc)	92.0 mm × 75.2 mm (3.62 in × 2.96 in)	2011–2012	Ferrari 599XX Evo	750 PS (552 kW; 740 hp) at 9000 rpm	700 N⋅m (71 kg⋅m) at 6500 rpm
F140 FE	6.3 L (6,262 cc)	94.0 mm × 75.2 mm (3.70 in × 2.96 in)	2014–2016	Ferrari FXX-K	860 PS (633 kW; 848 hp) at 9200 rpm + 190 PS (140 kW; 187 hp) from KERS total 1,050 PS (772 kW; 1,036 hp) at 9250 rpm	750 N⋅m (553 lbf⋅ft) at 6500 rpm + over 150 N⋅m (111 lbf⋅ft) from KERS total 900 N⋅m (664 lbf⋅ft) at 9250 rpm
F140 FE	6.3 L (6,262 cc)	94.0 mm × 75.2 mm (3.70 in × 2.96 in)	2017–2018	Ferrari FXX-K Evo	860 PS (633 kW; 848 hp) at 9250 rpm + 190 PS (140 kW; 187 hp) from KERS total 1,050 PS (772 kW; 1,036 hp)	

=== Non-Ferrari usage ===
- F140 E Apollo Intensa Emozione (2019-present)
- F140 FE Icona Vulcano V12 Hybrid H-Turismo

=== Maserati usage ===
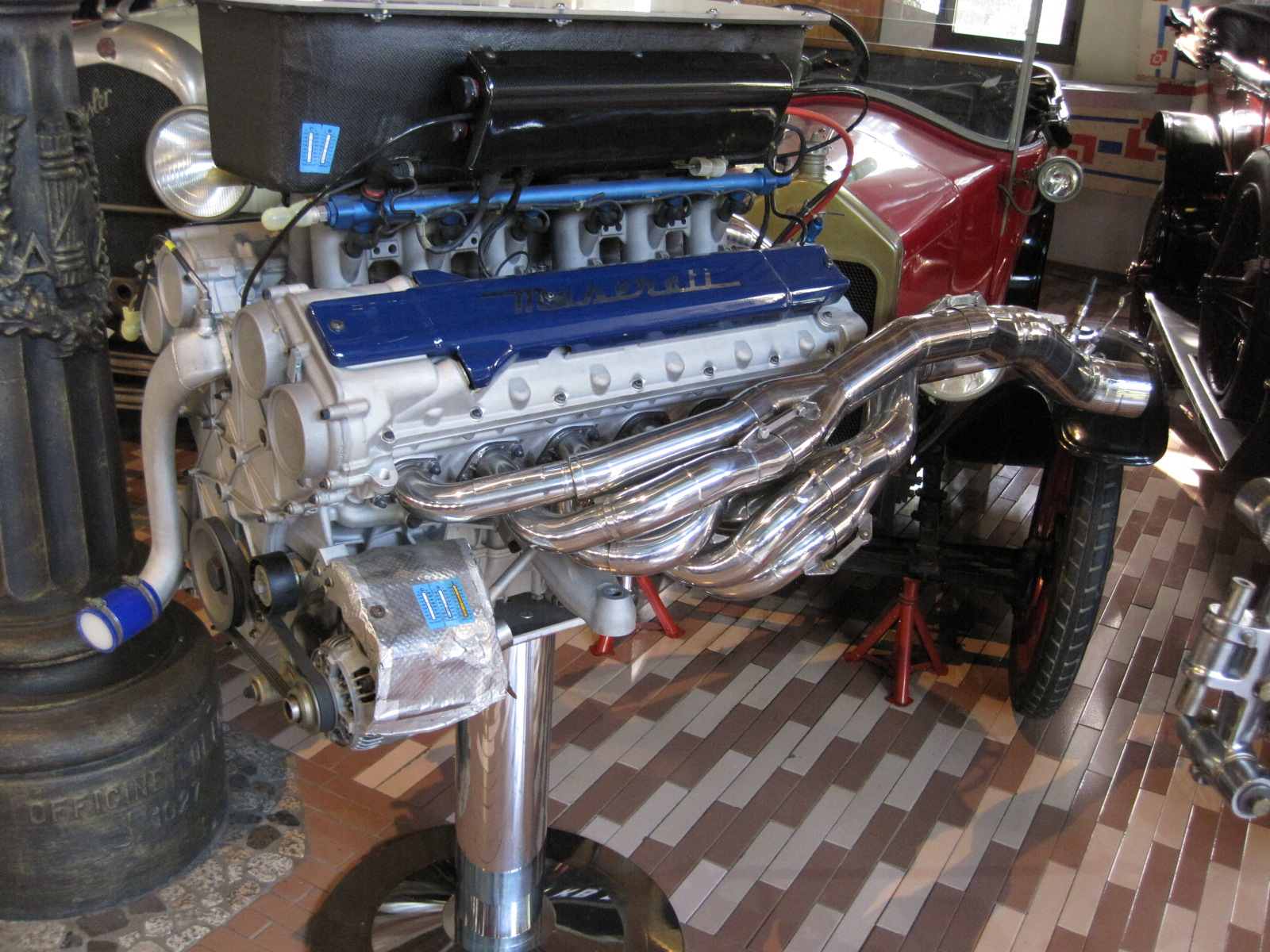
The Maserati M144A engine

==== Road engines ====
Engine	Displacement	Bore × stroke	Years	Usage	Power	torque
M144A	6.0 L (5,999 cc)	92.0 mm × 75.2 mm (3.62 in × 2.96 in) 0.5 L (499.9 cc) per cylinder	2004–2005	Maserati MC12	630 PS (463 kW; 621 hp) at 7500 rpm	652 N⋅m (66.5 kg⋅m) at 5500 rpm

==== Racing engines ====
Engine	Displacement	Bore × stroke	Years	Usage	Power	Notes
M144B/2	6.0 L (5,999 cc)	92.0 mm × 75.2 mm (3.62 in × 2.96 in) 0.5 L (499.9 cc) per cylinder	2004–2006	Maserati MC12 GT1	~600 PS (441 kW; 592 hp)	with restrictor plates
Unknown	6.0 L (5,999 cc)	92.0 mm × 75.2 mm (3.62 in × 2.96 in) 0.5 L (499.9 cc) per cylinder	2006–2007	Maserati MC12 Versione Corse	755 PS (555 kW; 745 hp) at 8,000 rpm / 740 N⋅m (75 kg⋅m) at 5500 rpm	

== Specifications ==
Models	Ferrari Enzo	Maserati MC12	Ferrari 599 GTO	Maserati MC12 Versione Corse	Ferrari 599XX Evo
Production year	2002-2004	2004-2005	2010–2012	2006-2007	2011–2012
Engine configuration	499.9 x V12				
Displacement	5,999 cc (6.0 L; 370 cu in)				
(power/unit displacement)	110 PS (80.9 kW; 108.5 hp) per litre	105 PS (77.2 kW; 103.6 hp) per litre	111.7 PS (82.2 kW; 110.2 hp) per litre	125.9 PS (92.6 kW; 124.2 hp) per litre	125 PS (91.9 kW; 123.3 hp) per litre
Power	660 PS (485 kW) at 7800 rpm	630 PS (463 kW) at 7500 rpm	670 PS (493 kW) at 8250 rpm	755 PS (555 kW) at 8000 rpm	750 PS (552 kW) at 9000 rpm
Curb weight	dry 1,255 kg (2,767 lb)	dry 1,335 kg (2,943 lb)	dry 1,495 kg (3,296 lb); 1605 kg (3538 lbs)	dry 1,150 kg (2,540 lb)	dry 1,310 kg (2,890 lb)
Power-to-weight ratio	526 per tonne 1.9 kg/ps	472 per tonne 2.12 kg/ps	448.16 per tonne 2.23 kg/ps	656.52 per tonne 1.52 kg/ps	572.52 per tonne 1.735 kg/ps
Torque	657 N⋅m (485 lb⋅ft) at 5500 rpm	652 N⋅m (481 lb⋅ft) at 5500 rpm	620 N⋅m (457 lb⋅ft) at 6500 rpm	740 N⋅m (546 lb⋅ft) at 5500 rpm	700 N⋅m (516 lb⋅ft) at 6500 rpm

== Awards ==
The F140 engine family has won a total of 6 awards in the International Engine of the Year competition. In 2013 the F140 FC V12 engine used in the Ferrari F12berlinetta was awarded "Best Performance Engine" and "Above 4.0 litre" recognitions. The F12tdf engine has won the "Above 4.0 litre" category in 2016 and 2017. In 2018 the 812 Superfast powerplant was recognised as "Best New Engine" and gave Ferrari another "Above 4.0 litre" class win.
