= Ferrari Purosangue =

Italian high-performance mid-size luxury crossover SUV

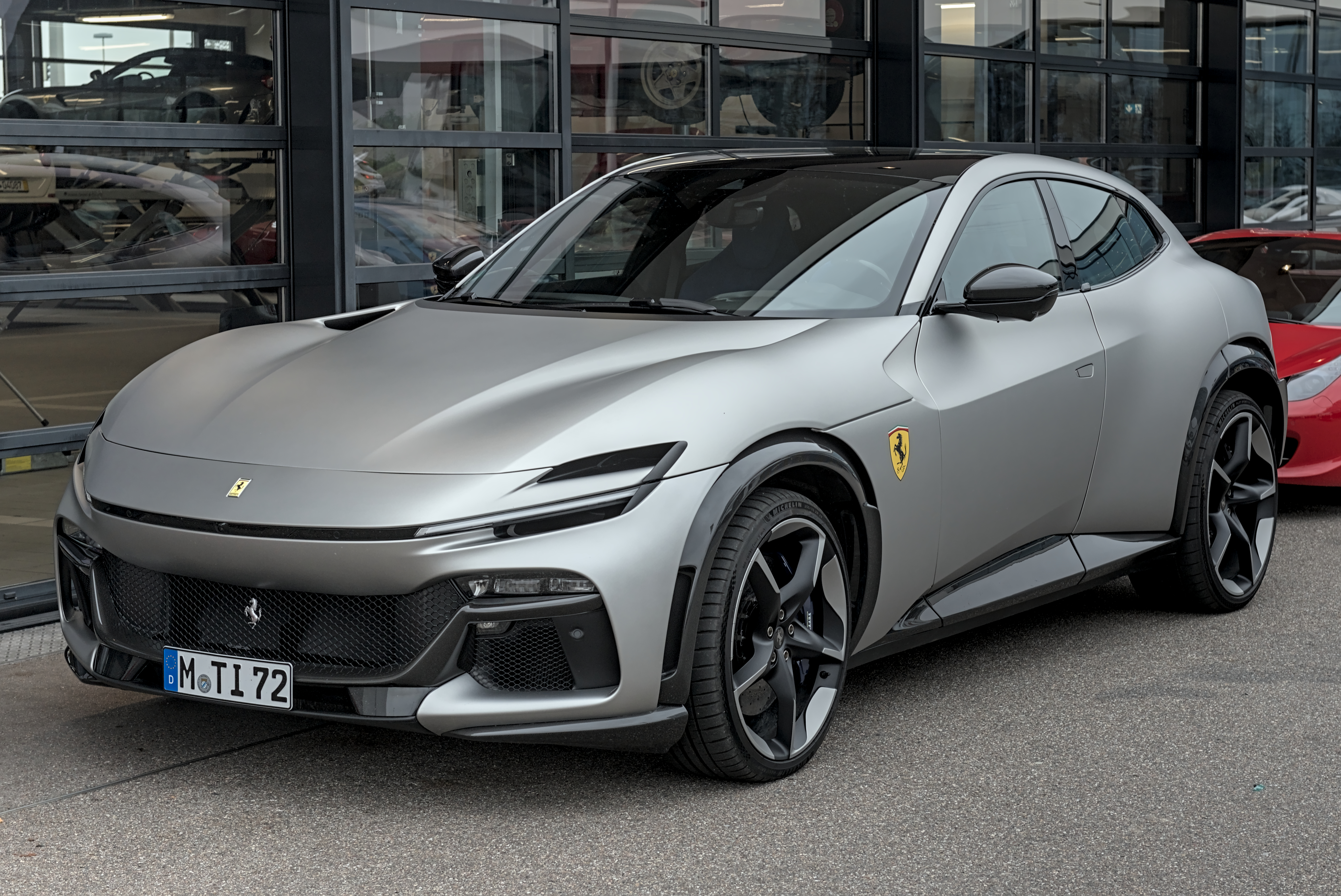

Overview
- Manufacturer: Ferrari
- Model code: F175
- Production: 2023–present
- Assembly: Italy: Maranello, Emilia-Romagna
- Designer: Ferrari Styling Centre under the direction of Flavio Manzoni

Body and chassis
- Class: Mid-size luxury crossover SUV
- Body style: 5-door SUV
- Layout: Front mid-engine, all-wheel drive
- Doors: Conventional doors (front); Coach doors (rear)
- Related: Ferrari Roma

Powertrain
- Engine: Petrol: 6.5 L (6,496 cc) F140 IA V12
- Power output: 533 kW (715 hp; 725 PS)
- Transmission: 8-speed Magna 8DCL900 dual-clutch

Dimensions
- Wheelbase: 3,018 mm (118.8 in)
- Length: 4,973 mm (195.8 in)
- Width: 2,028 mm (79.8 in)
- Height: 1,589 mm (62.6 in)
- Kerb weight: 2,170 kg (4,784 lb)

The Ferrari Purosangue (Type F175) is a high-performance mid-size luxury crossover SUV by Italian automobile manufacturer Ferrari that was introduced on 13 September 2022. It is Ferrari's first production 4-door vehicle and sport utility vehicle, and competes with other high-performance SUVs, such as the Lamborghini Urus and Aston Martin DBX.

The Purosangue is based on the same platform as the Ferrari Roma coupe and features fastback reminiscent styling. It has front-opening rear doors (with a fixed B-pillar), a configuration which aids ingress and egress of the rear seat. On multiple occasions, Ferrari has denied building an SUV; the Purosangue is strictly referred to by the manufacturer as FUV (Ferrari Utility Vehicle).

The Purosangue was awarded the Compasso d'Oro industrial design award in 2024.

== Name ==
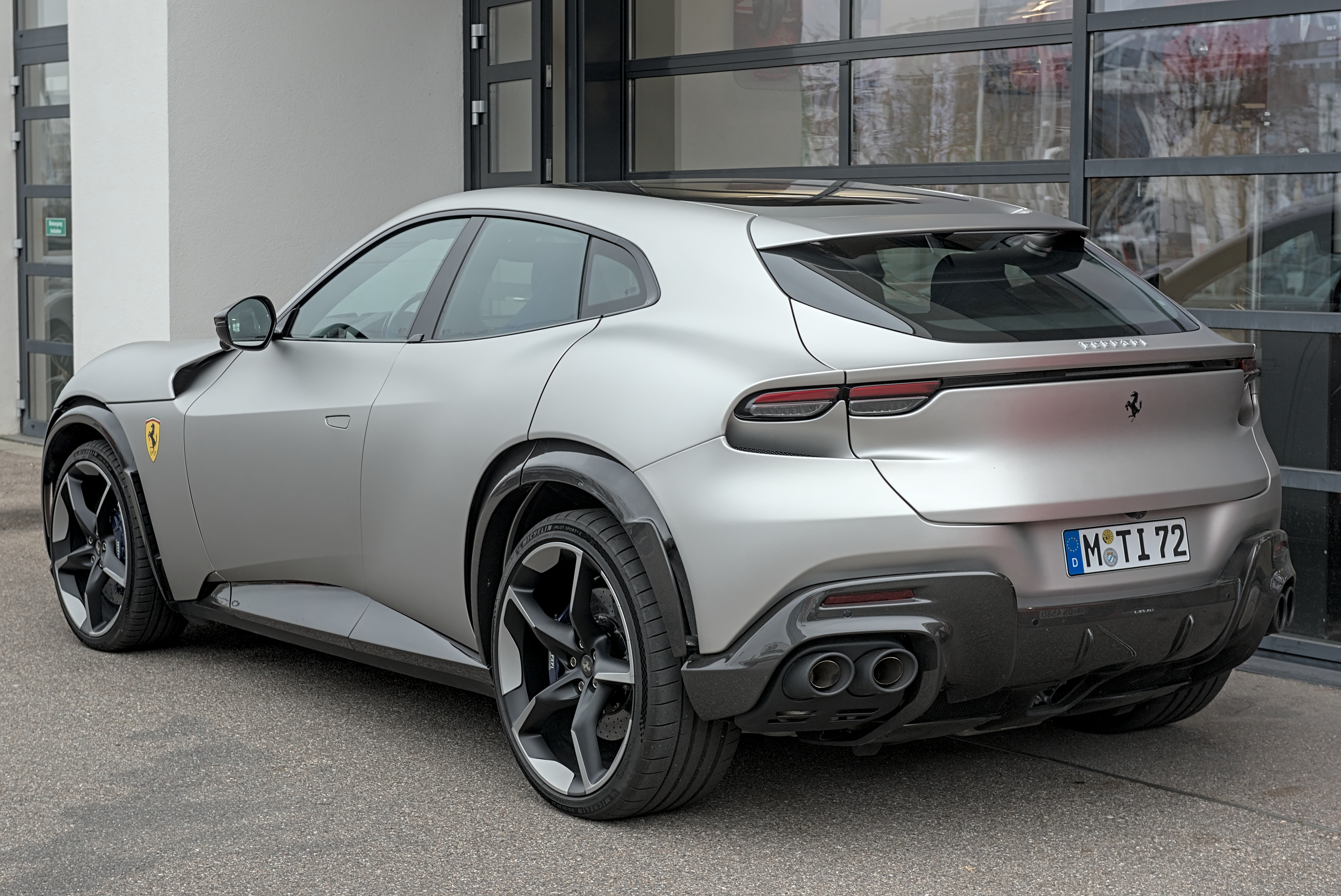
Rear view

The Ferrari Purosangue is named after the horse breed. In 2020, Ferrari attempted to trademark the 'Purosangue' moniker, however an organization, the Purosangue Foundation, blocked Ferrari from trademarking the name, and as a result the automaker filed a lawsuit against the organization for naming rights which went to court on 5 March 2021.

== Development ==
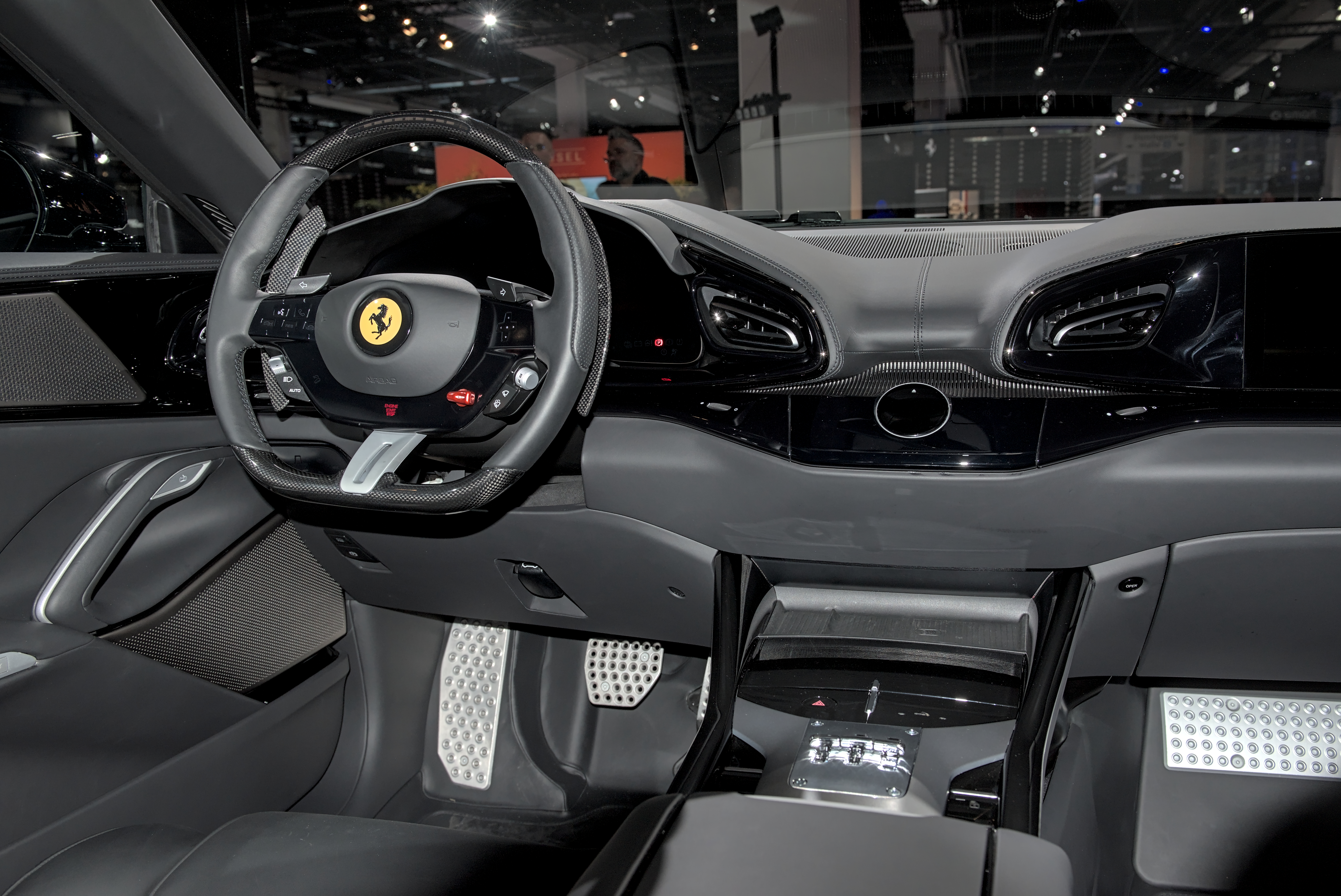
Interior

Development of the Purosangue, codenamed F175, began in 2017, and was hinted at by then-Ferrari CEO Sergio Marchionne, and was later officially confirmed in September 2018. The Purosangue was revealed on 13 September 2022 for the 2023 model year.

Spy shots of a Ferrari Purosangue test mule first appeared on the internet on 22 October 2018, with the prototype using a Ferrari GTC4Lusso. The Ferrari Purosangue appeared in leaked images in February 2022. A month later, Ferrari revealed a partial image of the Purosangue.

== Specifications ==
The Purosangue is powered by a 6.5 L F140 IA V12 engine producing 715 hp (725 PS; 533 kW) at 7,750 rpm and 528 lb⋅ft (716 N⋅m) of torque at 6,250 rpm, with a redline of 8,250 rpm. Ferrari claims a 0-100 km/h (62 mph) time of 3.3 seconds, 0-200 km/h (124 mph) in 10.6 seconds, and a top speed of over 310 km/h (193 mph). The Purosangue has an EPA rated fuel economy of 11 and 15 mpg_{‑US} (13.2 and 18.0 mpg_{‑imp}; 21.4 and 15.7 L/100 km; 4.7 and 6.4 km/L) for city and highway, and 12 mpg_{‑US} (14.4 mpg_{‑imp}; 19.6 L/100 km; 5.1 km/L) combined.
