= Ferrari 812 Superfast =

Grand tourer produced 2017–2024

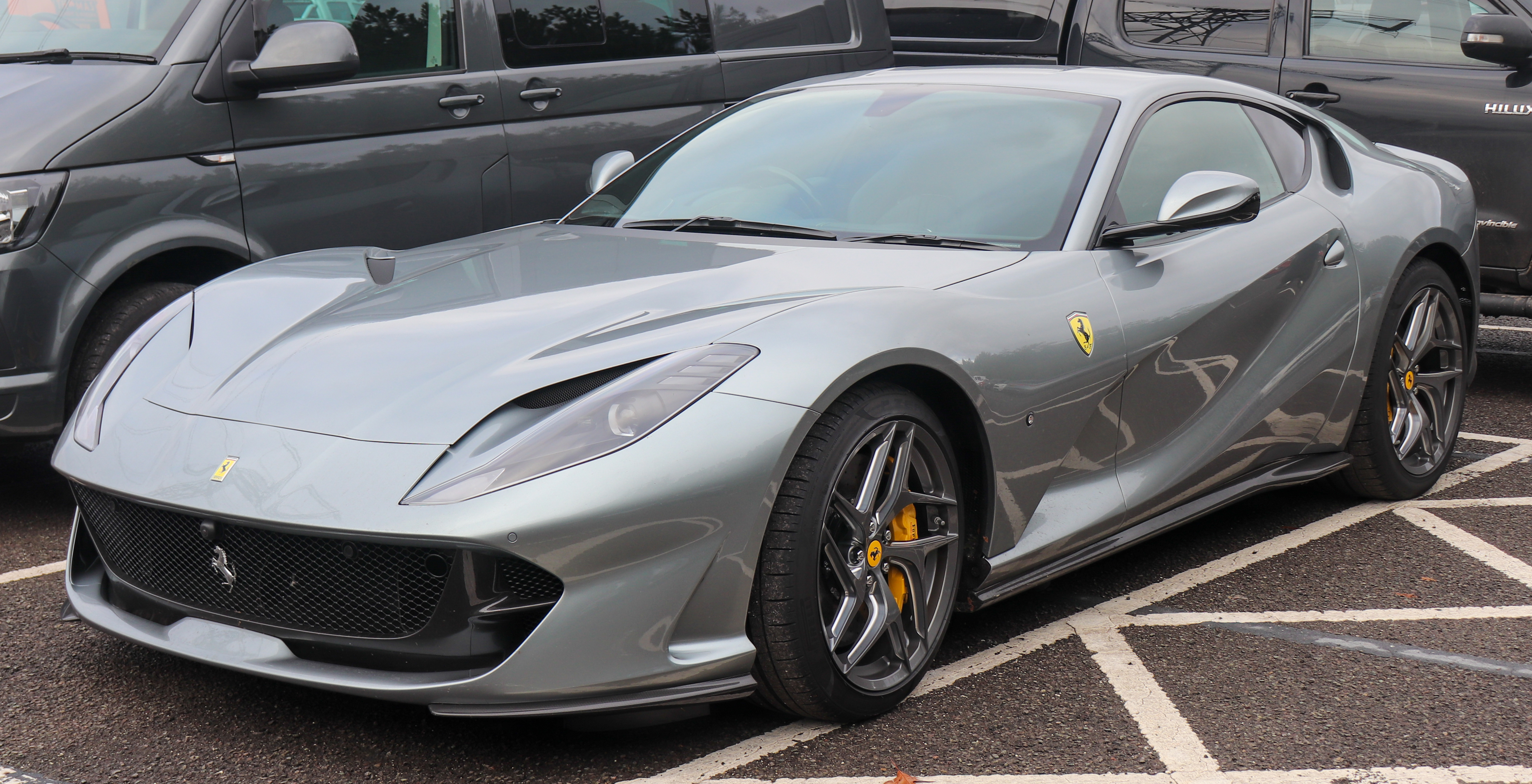

Overview
- Manufacturer: Ferrari
- Production: 2017–2024
- Assembly: Italy: Maranello
- Designer: Ferrari Styling Centre under Flavio Manzoni

Body and chassis
- Class: Grand tourer (S)
- Body style: 2-door berlinetta; 2-door retractable hardtop convertible (812 GTS); 2-door targa top (812 Competizione A)
- Layout: Front-mid engine, rear-wheel-drive
- Related: Ferrari Monza SP

Powertrain
- Engine: 6.5 L F140 GA/HB V12
- Power output: 812 Superfast & GTS: 800 PS (588 kW; 789 hp); 812 Competizione & Competizione A: 830 PS (610 kW; 819 hp)
- Transmission: 7-speed Magna 7DCL750 dual-clutch

Dimensions
- Wheelbase: 2,720 mm (107.1 in)
- Length: 4,657 mm (183.3 in)
- Width: 1,971 mm (77.6 in)
- Height: 1,276 mm (50.2 in)
- Kerb weight: 1,525 kg (3,362 lb) (dry); 1,744 kg (3,845 lb) (with fluids)

Chronology
- Predecessor: Ferrari F12berlinetta
- Successor: Ferrari 12Cilindri

The Ferrari 812 Superfast (Type F152M) is a front mid-engine, rear-wheel-drive grand tourer produced by the Italian sports car manufacturer Ferrari that made its debut at the 2017 Geneva Motor Show. The 812 Superfast is the successor to the F12berlinetta.

== Specifications ==
=== Engine ===
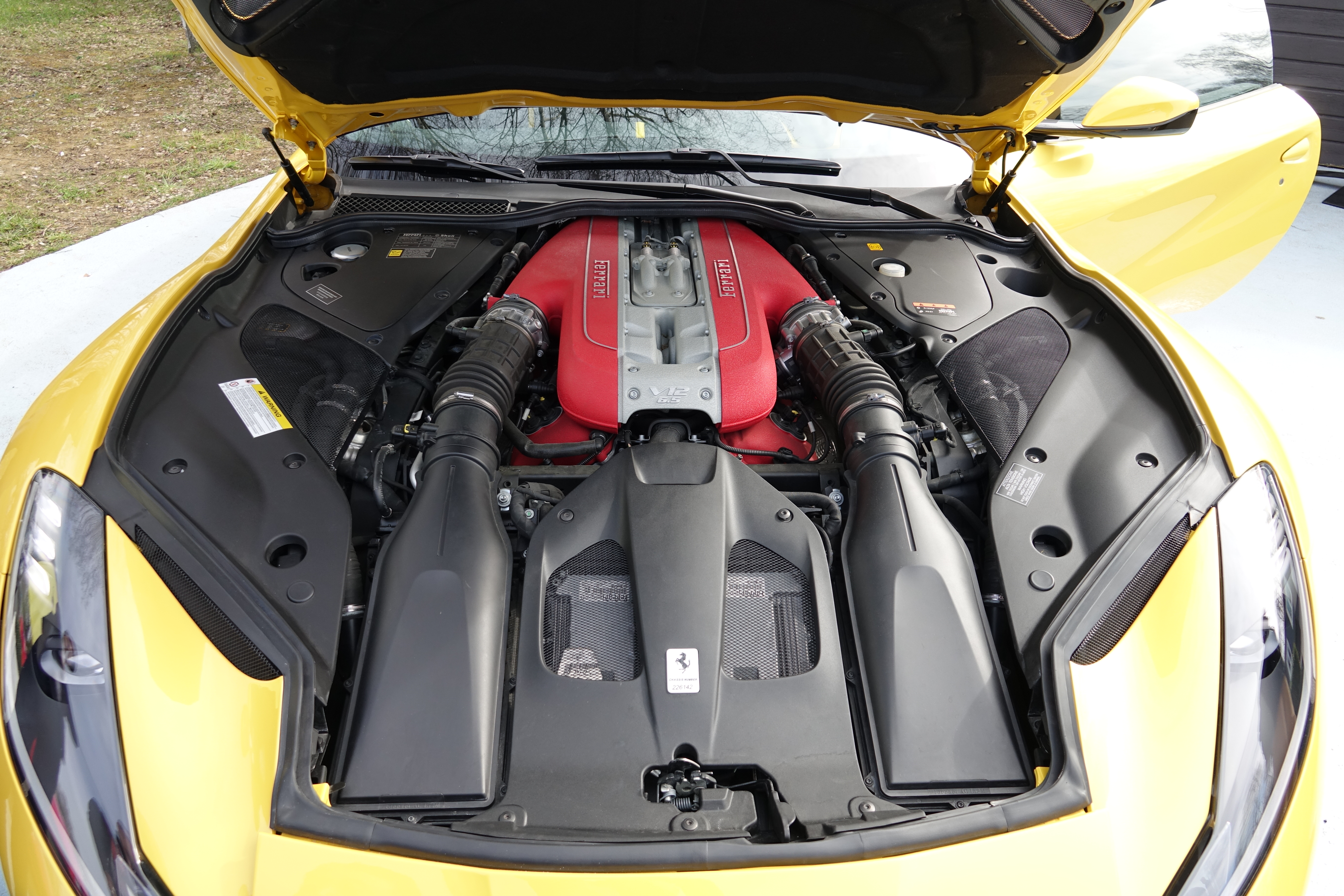
The 6.5-litre F140 GA V12 engine

The 812 Superfast has a 6,496 cc (6.5 L) F140 GA V12, an enlarged version of the 6.3-litre engine used in the F12berlinetta. It generates a power output of 800 PS (588 kW; 789 hp) at 8,500 rpm and 718 N⋅m (530 lb⋅ft) of torque at 7,000 rpm. According to Ferrari in 2018, the 812 Superfast's engine was, at the time, the most powerful naturally aspirated production car engine ever made. It does not feature turbocharging or hybrid technology. Cars built in 2019 or before were not fitted with petrol particulate filters, whereas cars built in 2020 or after are now fitted with the emissions device.

=== Transmission ===
The transmission for the 812 Superfast is a 7-speed dual-clutch automatic gearbox manufactured for Ferrari by Getrag, based on the gearbox used in the 458.

=== Wheels ===
The 812 Superfast has 20-inch wheels at the front and the rear. The tires are Pirelli P Zero with codes of 275/35 ZR 20 for the front tires and 315/35 ZR 20 for the rear. The brakes are carbon-ceramic Brembo Extreme Design disc brakes, which Ferrari claims have 5.8% improved braking performance from 100 km/h to 0 km/h as compared to the F12berlinetta. The brakes are borrowed from the LaFerrari, with a diameter of 398 mm (15.7 in) at the front and 360 mm (14.2 in) at the rear.

=== Aerodynamics ===
The car includes a mix of active and passive aerodynamics to improve drag coefficient values over the F12berlinetta. The front of the car is designed to increase downforce and includes intakes for front brake cooling, as well as ducts to increase underbody air flow. The bonnet of the car also has air bypasses to move air through to the side of the car for additional downforce and aero efficiency. The rear diffuser of the 812 Superfast has active flaps that can open up at high speeds to reduce drag.

=== Performance ===
Ferrari claims that the 812 Superfast has a top speed of 340 km/h (211 mph) with a 0–100 km/h (0–62 mph) acceleration time of 2.9 seconds. Motor Trend tested the 812 Superfast in 2018 and found that the car accelerated from 0-60 mph (97 km/h) in 2.8 seconds and achieved a 10.4-second quarter-mile time with a trap speed of 138.6 mph (223 km/h). The car has a power to weight ratio of 2.18 kg (4.81 lb) per horsepower (PS). The 812 Superfast is the first Ferrari equipped with EPS (Electronic Power Steering). It also shares the rear-wheel-steering system (Virtual Short Wheelbase 2.0) borrowed from the limited edition F12 TDF. The weight distribution of the car is 47% front, 53% rear. The car has recorded a laptime of 1:21.50 around the Fiorano racetrack, 0.50 seconds behind the more track-focused F12tdf. The Ferrari 812 Superfast is equipped with a series of electrical controls such as: ESP, ESC and it's equipped with F1 track mode.

== Design ==
The design is based on the F12berlinetta, with some new styling cues like full LED headlamps, air vents on the bonnet, quad circular taillights, and a body-colored rear diffuser. The two-box, high tail design of the car is intended to resemble that of the 365 GTB/4 Daytona, a Pininfarina design, though the car was designed at the Ferrari Styling Center.

The interior of the 812 Superfast takes inspiration from both the preceding F12berlinetta and the interior of the LaFerrari, especially the shape and position of the air vents and the contours of the dashboard.

As part of the Ferrari's flagship model design, the 812 Superfast's center control stack continues to lack a central infotainment display featured in entry-level models such as the GTC4Lusso and Portofino, retaining only a small temperature display for the climate control system and splitting all vehicular status information displays among the driver's multifunction instrument cluster, as well as the passenger-side touchscreen stack display above the glove compartment area.

As with certain previous models, the 812 Superfast can be ordered with specially designed, model name-tagged, multi-piece luggage set which fits into the vehicle's rear trunk.

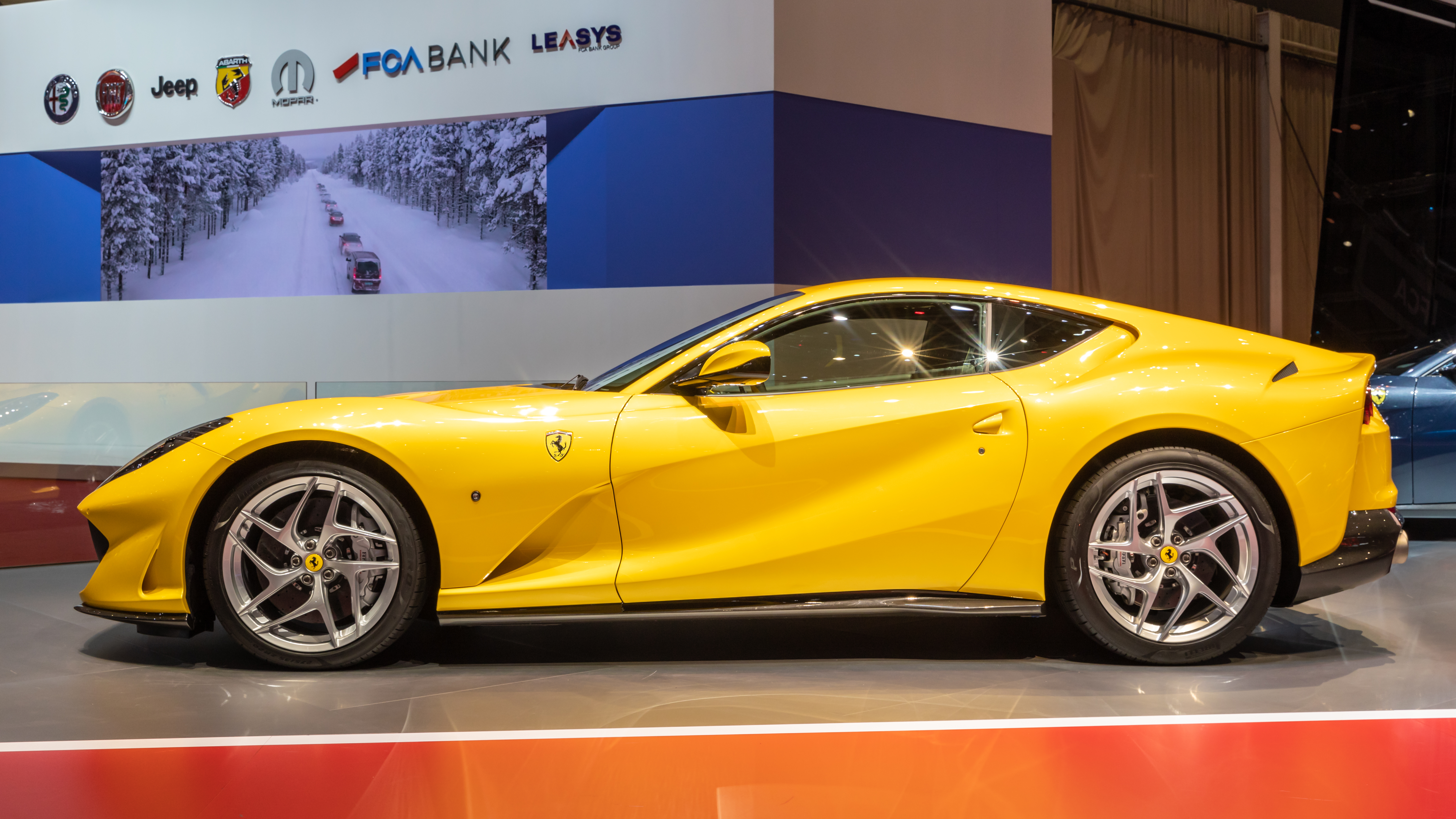
The side profile of the 812 Superfast

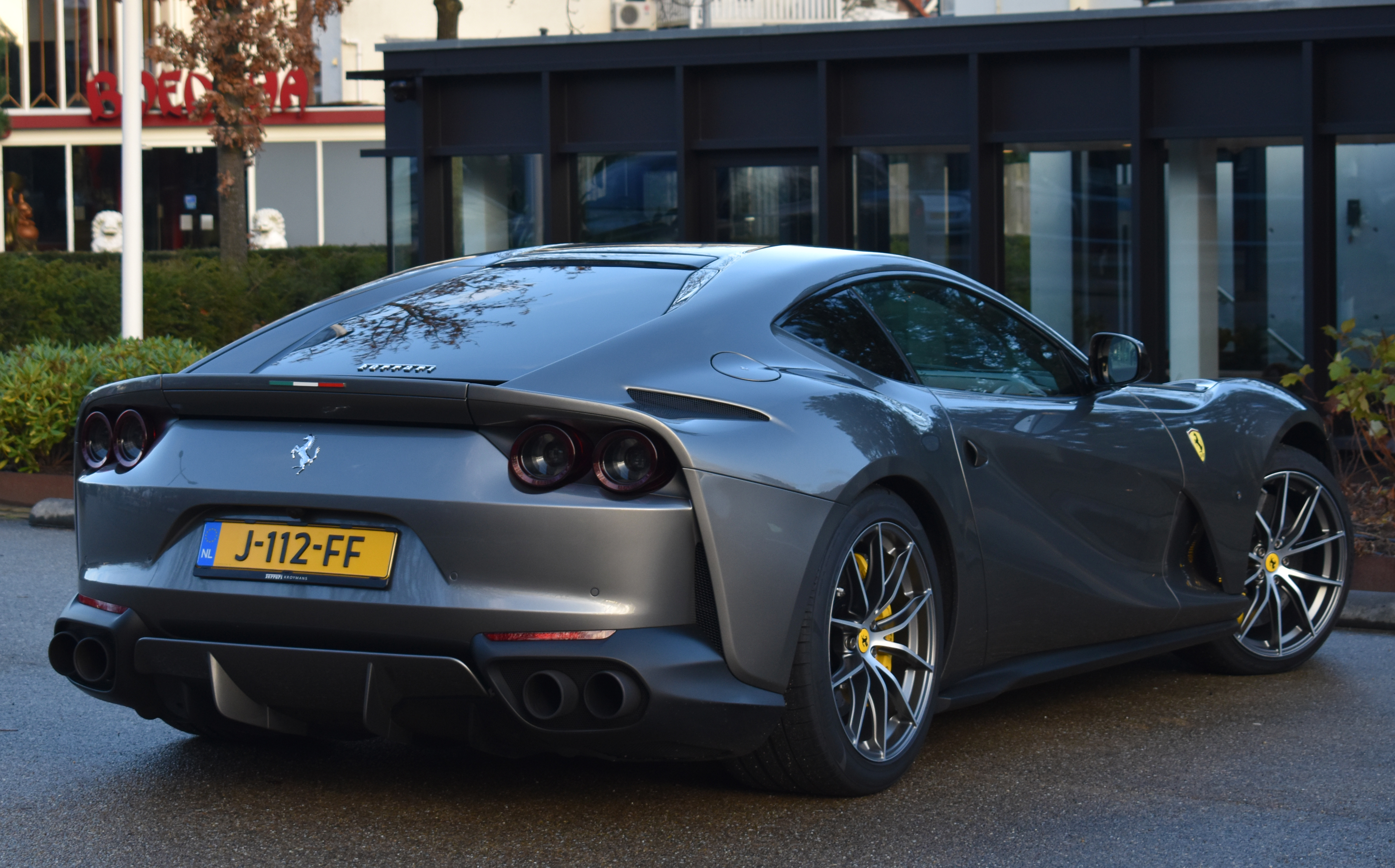
Rear 3/4 view showing quad tail lights and body-colored diffuser

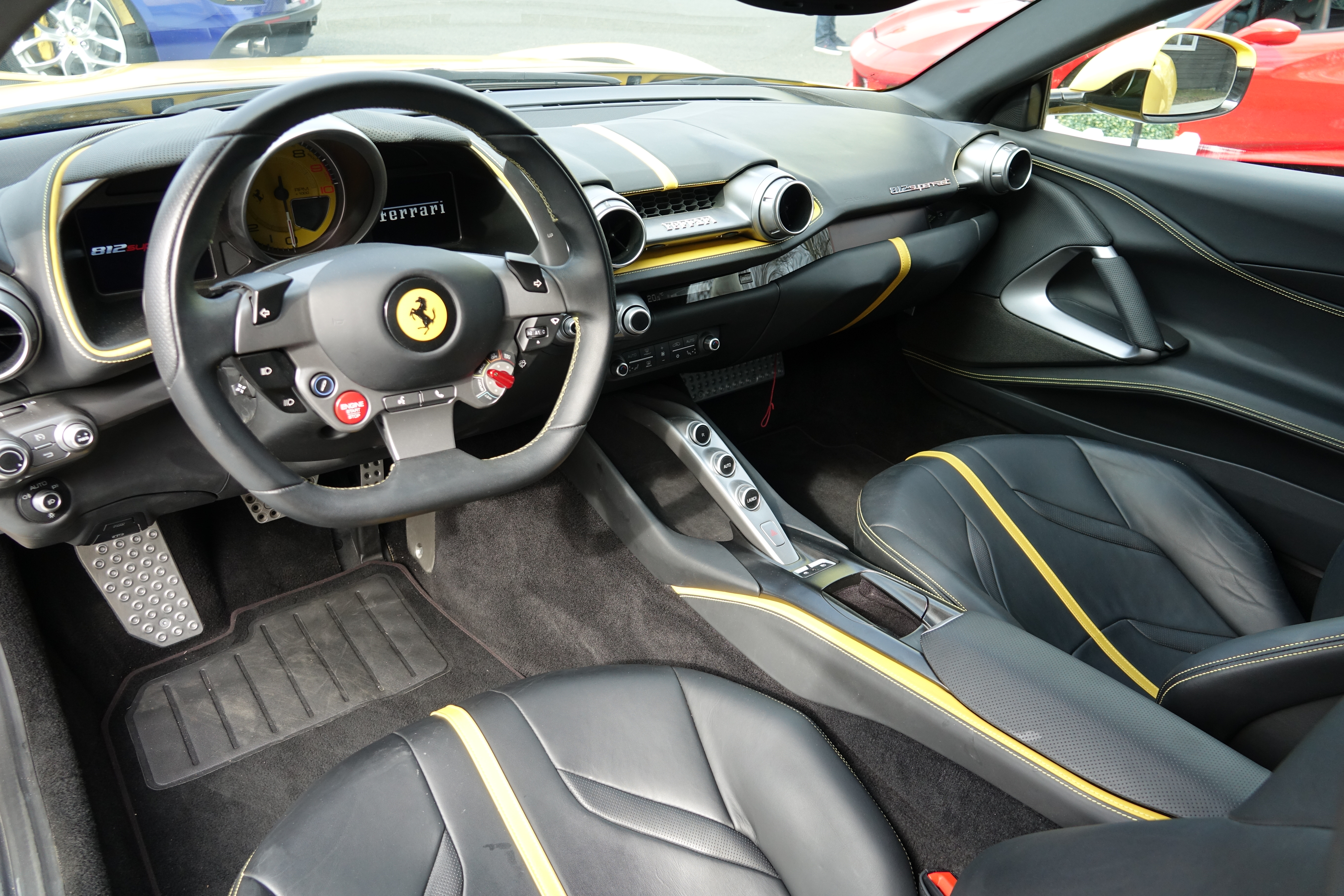
Interior

== Variants ==
=== 812 GTS ===
Unveiled in September 2019, the Ferrari 812 GTS is the open top version of the 812 Superfast. This marks the first front-engine V12 series production convertible model offered by Ferrari in 50 years, as the convertible variants of the 550, the 575 and the 599 were limited edition models meant for special customers only.

The large rear buttresses present at the rear hold the folding hard top roof under a tonneau cover present between them when not in use. The electronically operated hard top takes 14 seconds for operation and is operable at speeds up to 45 km/h (28 mph).

The GTS weighs 75 kg (165 lb) more than the Superfast due to chassis reinforcing components but maintains equal performance. The mechanical components including the engine remain the same as the Superfast except for the transmission which has shorter gear ratios to improve the car's response to throttle inputs. The engine's high-pressure injection system reduces the number of particles that are emitted before the catalytic converter warms up. There is also a new gasoline particulate filter and a stop-start system to improve fuel economy. Other features shared with the Superfast include the Manettino dial, side-slip angle control and variable steering weight. The car has been aerodynamically refined in order to eliminate any turbulence arising from the loss of a fixed roof.

812 GTS

=== 812 Competizione & Competizione A ===
On May 5, 2021, Ferrari presented a limited production, track focused version of the 812 Superfast, called Competizione, this version being presented together with its drop-top variant, Competizione A (for Aperta, Ferrari's moniker for limited open top models, translating to "open" in Italian). Both versions have a more powerful version of the 6.5-litre V12, extensive aerodynamic upgrades and the introduction of an independent four-wheel steering system. The upgraded engine is rated at 830 PS (610 kW; 819 hp) at 9,250 rpm and 692 N⋅m (510 lb⋅ft) of torque at 7,000 rpm, and is capable of a 9,500 rpm redline. The 812 Competizione & Competizione A are the latest iterations of Ferrari's light weight limited edition front mid-engined V12 Berlinetta platform. They are the direct successors to the F12 TDF and 599 GTO. In total, only 999 Competizione and 599 Competizione A were to be produced, and both models were sold out by the time they were shown. As with other strictly limited models from Ferrari, these cars are allocated only to customers that meet certain criteria.

Competizione with optional carbon fibre wheels

Competizione A

== One-offs ==
=== Omologata ===
The Ferrari Omologata was unveiled on 25 September 2020. It is a unique model produced for a wealthy European client of the manufacturer. The Omologata is the tenth "V12 engine in front position" project of the special, one-off department since the 2009 Ferrari P 540 Superfast Aperta.

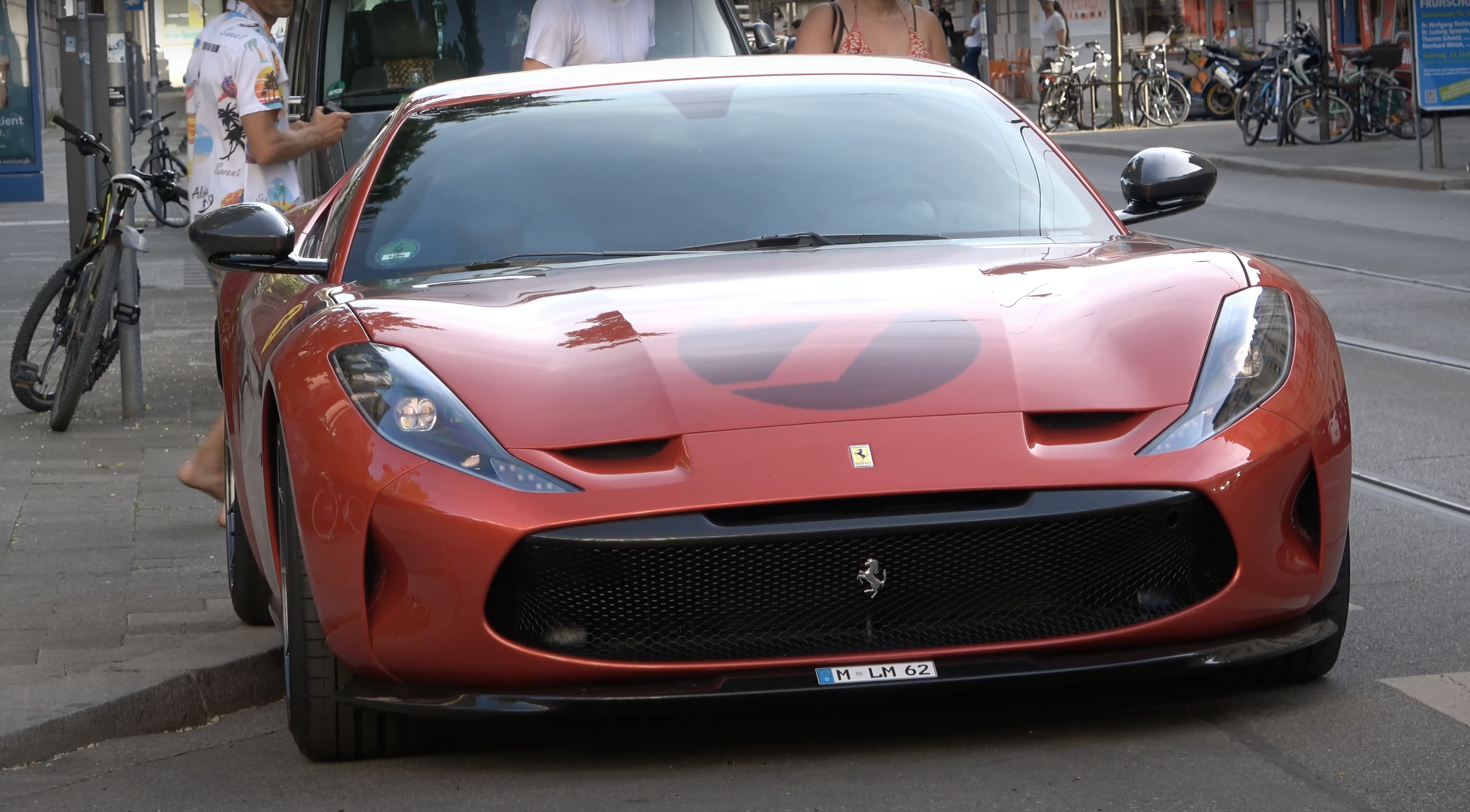

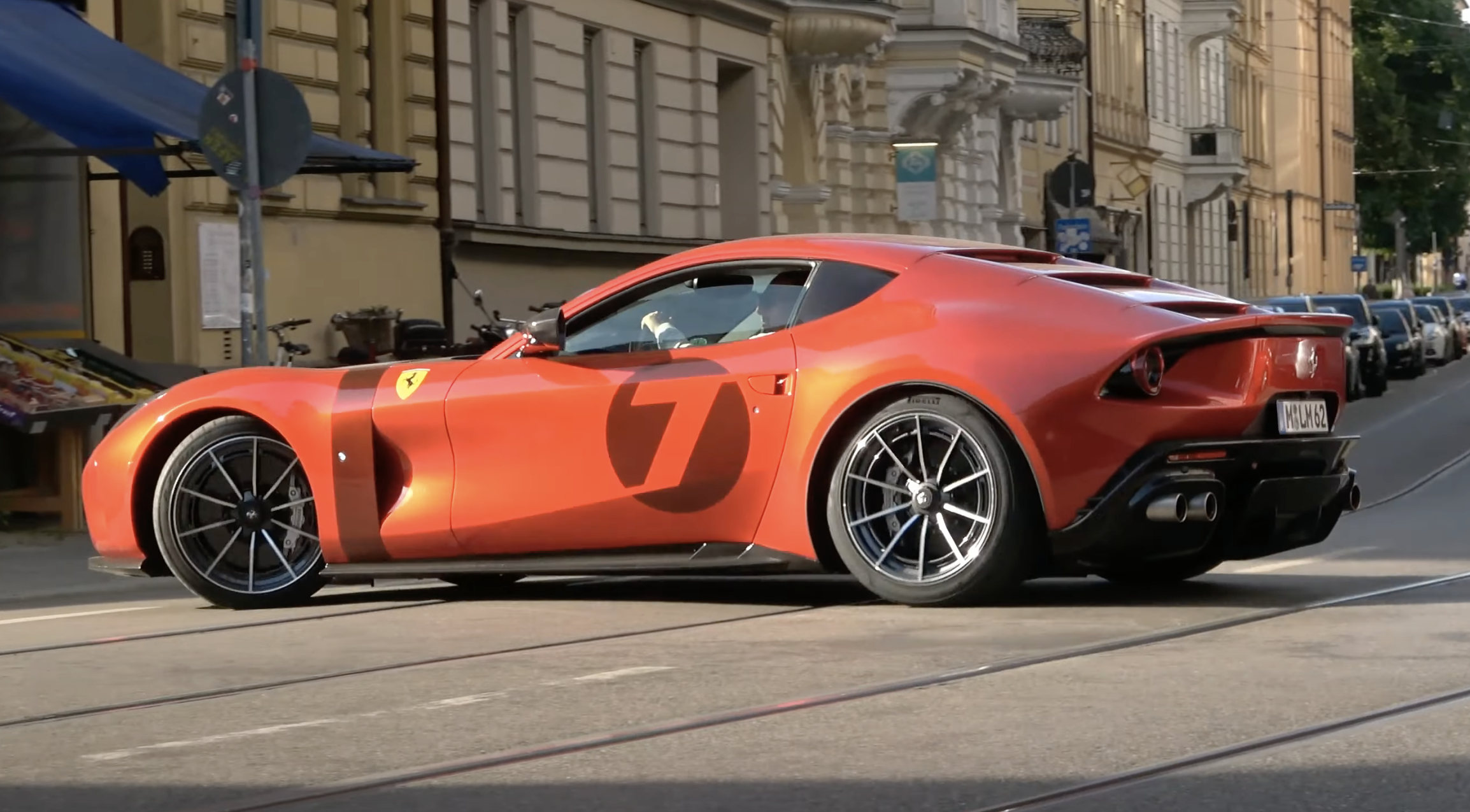

=== SP51 ===
The Ferrari SP51 is a one-off based on the Ferrari 812 GTS developed upon a special request of a client in Taiwan. The car is a unique V12 roadster with total absence of a roof. The front end of the car is redesigned and features unique headlights which are shorter and much less angled than those on the 812 GTS. The bodywork is painted in Rosso Passionale three-layer paintwork developed specifically for the car and a blue and white livery inspired by the Ferrari 410 S.

== Ferrari Monza SP ==
At a private event held for customers and investors at the company's headquarters in Maranello, Italy in September 2018, Ferrari unveiled the first two models in its new Icona series of models. The cars called the Monza SP1 and SP2 (1 and 2 denoting the seating capacity) are inspired from open top race cars of the 1950s, such as the 750 Monza. The cars are based on the 812 Superfast and utilises its chassis, engine, transmission and interior components but the engine has been tuned to generate a maximum power output of 810 PS (596 kW; 799 hp). The Monza can accelerate from 0–100 km/h (0–62 mph) in 2.9 seconds, 0–200 km/h (0–124 mph) in 7.9 seconds and can attain a top speed of 299 km/h (186 mph). The car uses a carbon fibre construction and features bespoke wheels, interior colour choices, small scissor doors and a full LED strip serving as the tail light of the car. The virtual windshield (present ahead of the driver only and a concept used previously in the Mercedes SLR McLaren Stirling Moss) disrupts airflow over the driver in order to maintain maximum driving comfort. Due to the use of lightweight materials, the Monza SP2 weighs 1,500 kg (3,306.9 lb) while the SP1 weighs a further 20 kg (44.1 lb) less due to the absence of passenger seat.

Production of the Monza SP was limited to 499 units.

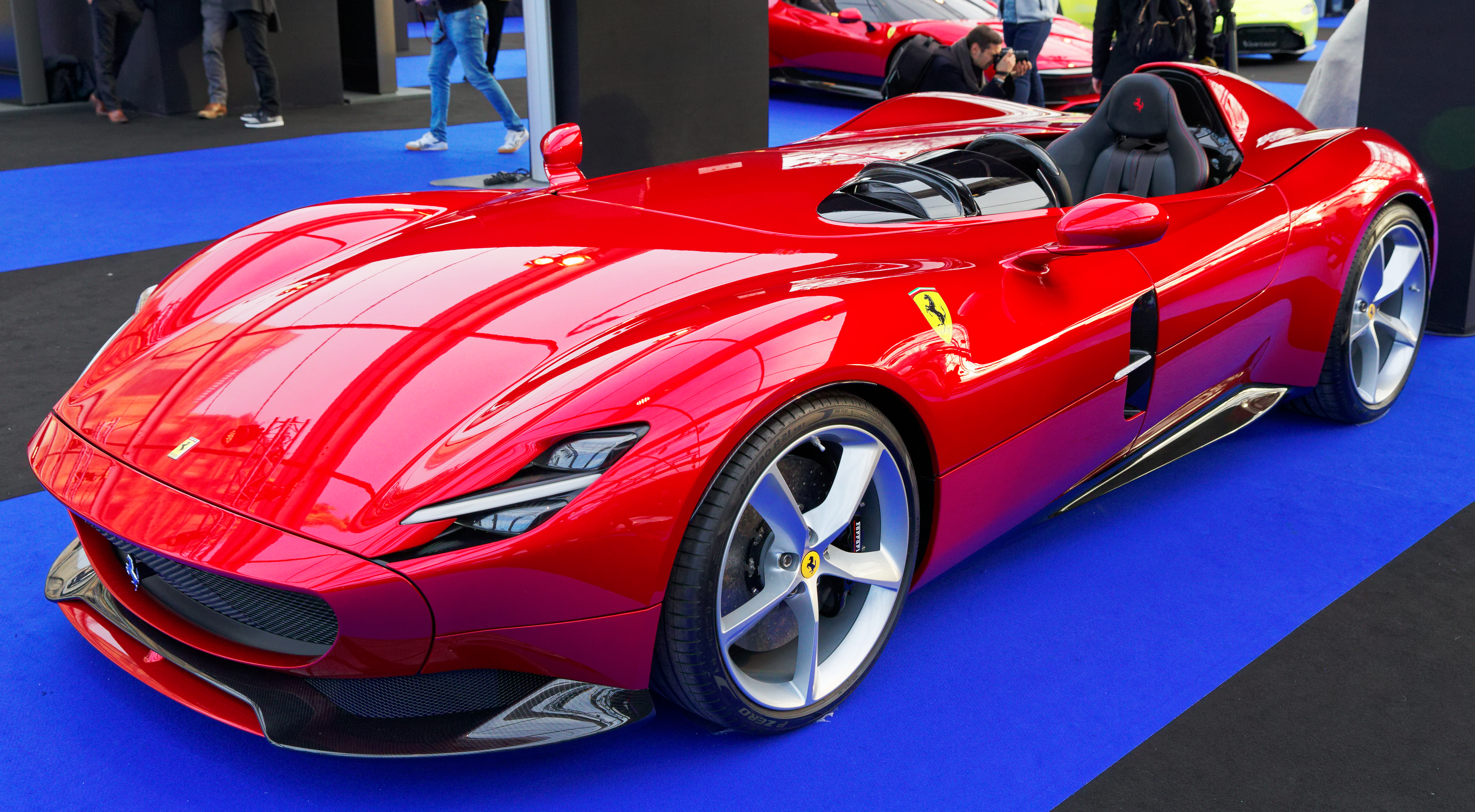
Monza SP1

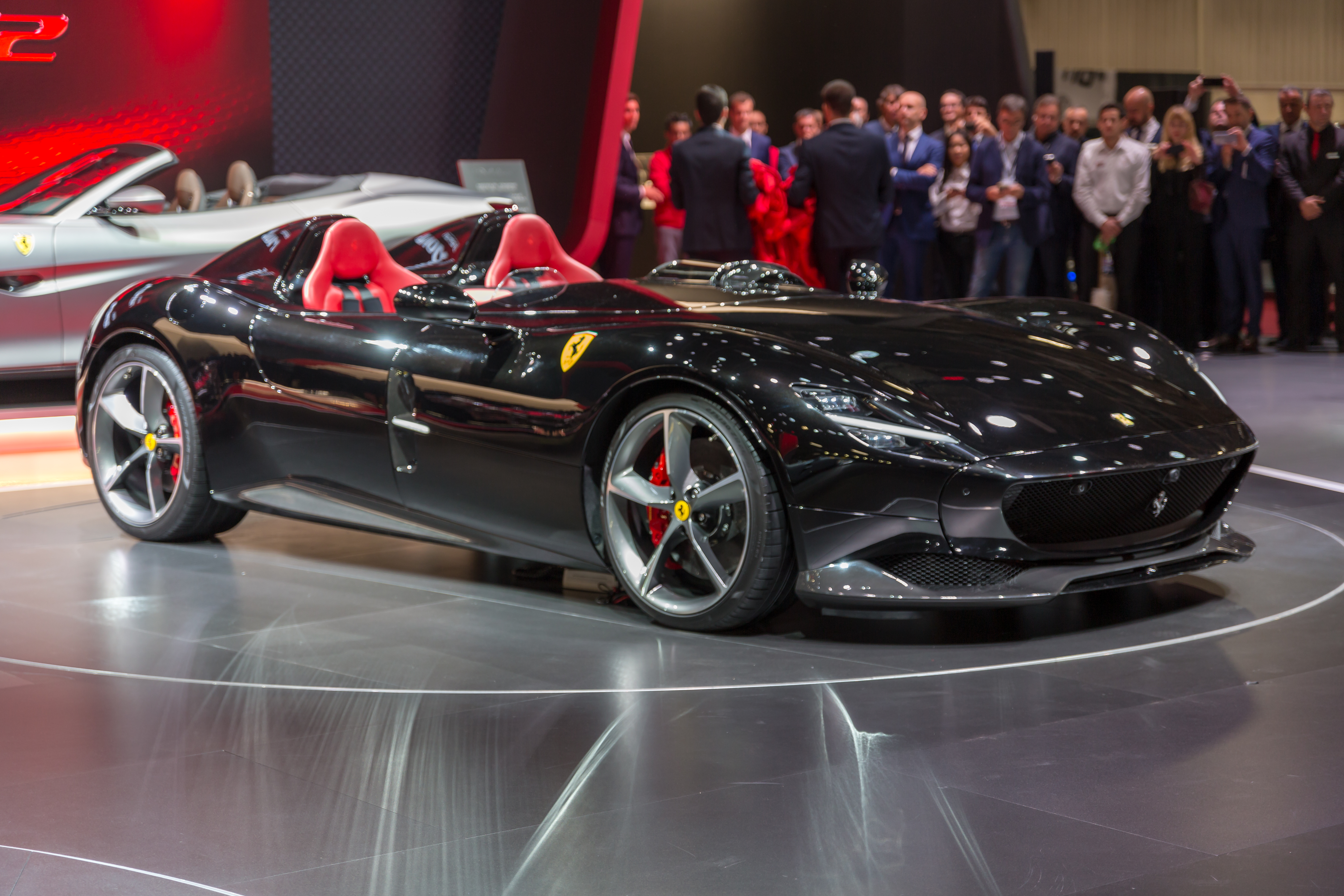
Monza SP2 at the 2018 Paris Motor Show
