= Ferrari GTC4Lusso =

Grand tourer car produced by Ferrari (2016-2020)

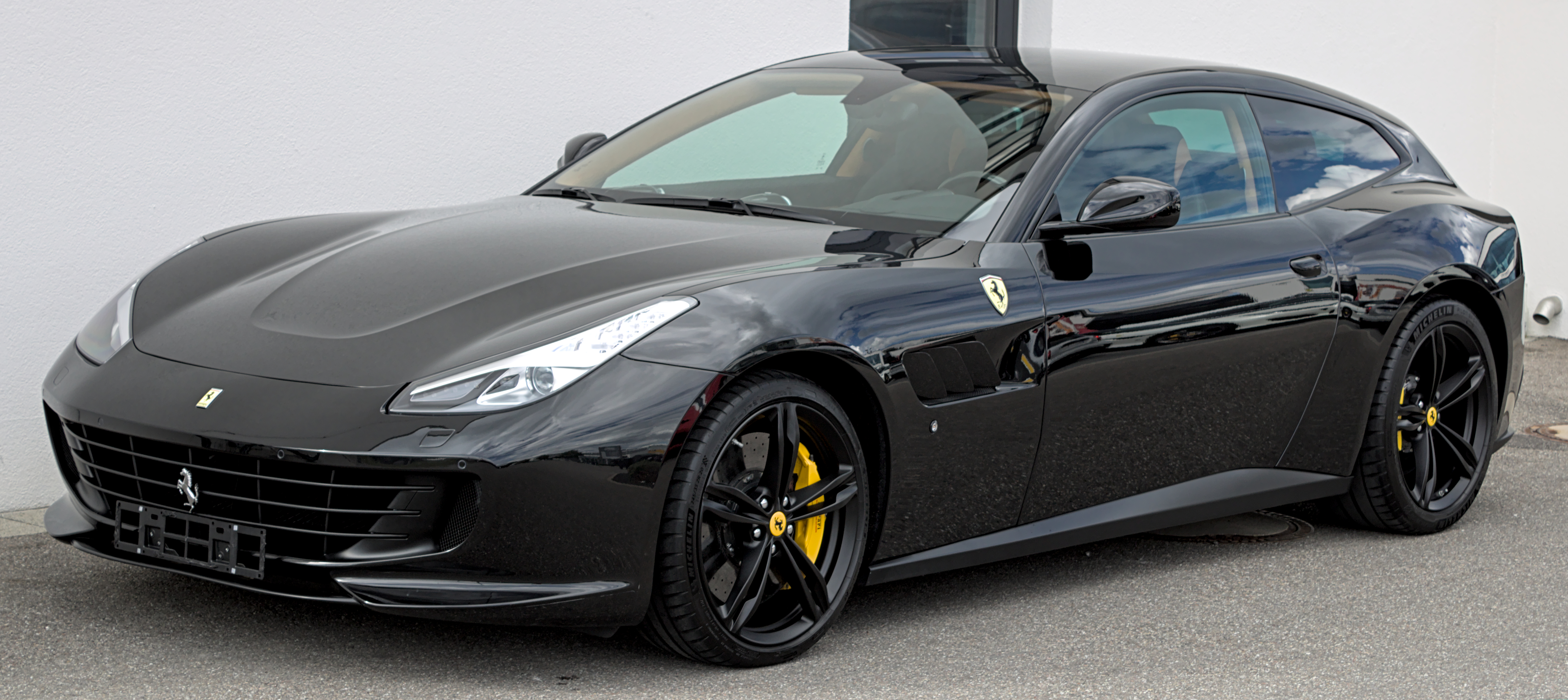

Overview
- Manufacturer: Ferrari
- Production: 2016–2020
- Assembly: Italy: Maranello
- Designer: Ferrari Styling Centre under Flavio Manzoni

Body and chassis
- Class: Grand tourer (S)
- Body style: 3-door shooting brake
- Layout: Front mid-engine, all-wheel drive / rear-wheel drive (GTC4Lusso T)
- Related: Ferrari 812 Superfast

Powertrain
- Engine: 3.9 L F154 BD twin-turbocharged V8 (GTC4Lusso T); 6.3 L F140 ED V12 (GTC4Lusso)
- Power output: GTC4Lusso: 690 PS (507 kW; 681 hp); GTC4Lusso T: 610 PS (449 kW; 602 hp)
- Transmission: 7-speed Magna 7DCL750 dual-clutch

Dimensions
- Wheelbase: 2,990 mm (117.7 in)
- Length: 4,922 mm (193.8 in)
- Width: 1,980 mm (78.0 in)
- Height: 1,383 mm (54.4 in)
- Kerb weight: GTC4Lusso: 1,790 kg (3,946 lb) (dry); GTC4Lusso T: 1,740 kg (3,836 lb) (dry)

Chronology
- Predecessor: Ferrari FF
- Successor: none

The Ferrari GTC4Lusso (Type F151M) is a four-seat grand touring car produced by Italian automobile manufacturer Ferrari from 2016 to 2020. The GTC4Lusso is a successor to the Ferrari FF.

== Models ==
=== GTC4Lusso (2016–2020) ===
Like its predecessor, the GTC4Lusso is a 3-door shooting brake with an all-wheel drive drivetrain, and is powered by a front-mid mounted V12 engine.

The GTC4Lusso's 6,262 cc (382.1 cu in) Ferrari F140 65° V12 engine is rated at 690 PS (507 kW; 681 hp) at 8,000 rpm and 697 N⋅m (514 lb⋅ft) of torque at 5,750rpm. The increase in output of the engine is due to the compression ratio raised to 13.5:1. Ferrari claims a top speed of 335 km/h (208 mph), unchanged from the FF, and a 0–100 km/h (0–62 mph) acceleration time of 3.4 seconds.

The car uses an improved version (called the 4RM Evo) of Ferrari's patented four-wheel drive system introduced on the FF, integrated with four-wheel steering into the system. Collectively, the system is called 4RM-S.

The GTC4Lusso was unveiled at the 2016 Geneva Motor Show.

=== GTC4Lusso T (2017–2020) ===
Unveiled at the 2016 Paris Motor Show, the GTC4Lusso T is a rear wheel drive only version of the GTC4Lusso powered by a V8 engine with lesser displacement, though the 4WS four-wheel steering system from its V12 variant is retained.

The GTC4Lusso T comes with a 3,855 cc (235.2 cu in) Ferrari F154 twin turbocharged V8 engine rated at 610 PS (449 kW; 602 hp) at 7,500 rpm and 760 N⋅m (561 ft⋅lb) of torque at 3,000–5,250 rpm. According to the manufacturer, the car can attain a top speed of over 320 km/h (199 mph) and accelerate from 0 to 100 km/h (0 to 62 mph) in 3.5 seconds.

On August 31, 2020, Ferrari confirmed the end of production for the GTC4Lusso.

== Design ==
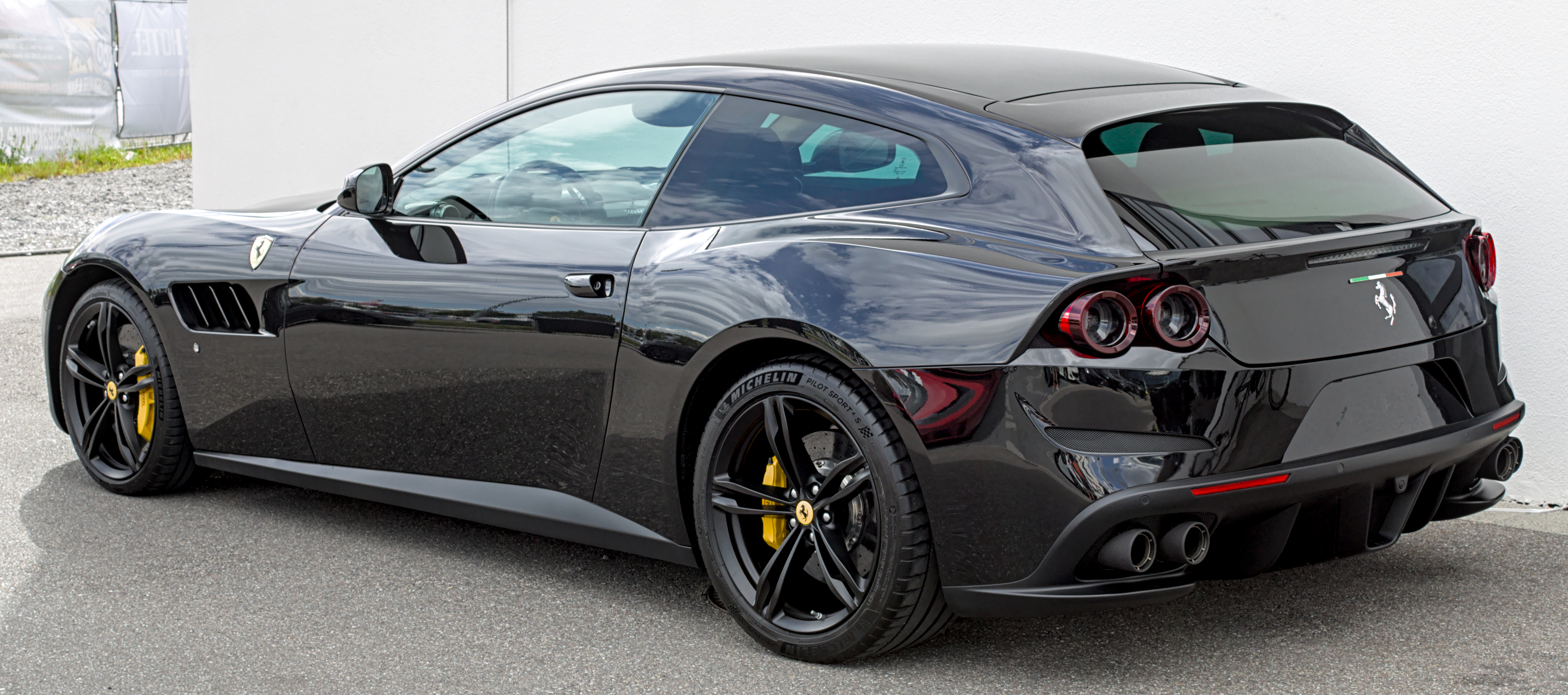
Ferrari GTC4Lusso rear

The rear features Ferrari's signature Quad Circular Rear Lights (last seen on the F430, 812 Superfast and later seen on the F8) and the interior contains a Dual Cockpit Concept Design, separating the Driver Cockpit and the Passenger Cockpit by a central divider. The front of the car has a single grille that provides all the necessary cooling.

The GTC4Lusso is a further refinement of the shooting-brake coupe, reinterpreting the concept with an extremely streamlined, tapered shape that gives it an almost fastback-like silhouette.

== Engines ==
Petrol engines
Model	Year(s)	Type/code	Power, Torque
GTC4Lusso	2016–2020	6,262 cc (382.1 cu in) V12 (F140 ED)	690 PS (507 kW; 681 hp) at 8,000 rpm, 700 N⋅m (516 ft⋅lb) at 5,750 rpm
GTC4Lusso T	2017–2020	3,855 cc (235.2 cu in) V8 twin turbo (F154 BD)	610 PS (449 kW; 602 hp) at 7,500 rpm, 760 N⋅m (561 ft⋅lb) at 3,000–5,250 rpm

== One-offs ==
=== BR20 ===
The Ferrari BR20 is a one-off model created by Ferrari's Special Projects Programme and based on the V12-engined GTC4Lusso. It features redesigned bodywork that Ferrari says takes inspiration from past V12 Ferrari models such as the 410 Superamerica and 500 Superfast, with the biggest change being a new rear roofline that turns the car from a shooting brake into a fastback coupé. The new bodywork also features changes to the front bumper, rear bumper, exhaust tips, rear diffuser, and headlights, as well as new carbon fibre and chrome trim on the front and sides respectively. The new bodywork increases the overall length by three inches over the standard GTC4Lusso, and the rear seats were removed to accommodate the new sloping roofline. The interior features upholstery in two shades of brown leather, with carbon fibre and oak trim. Mechanically the car reportedly remains unchanged from the standard V12 GTC4Lusso. The price of this car has been not revealed and was developed for a long-standing customer. It currently resides in Saudi Arabia.
