= Ferrari Daytona SP3 =

Italian mid-engine 'Targa' style sports car

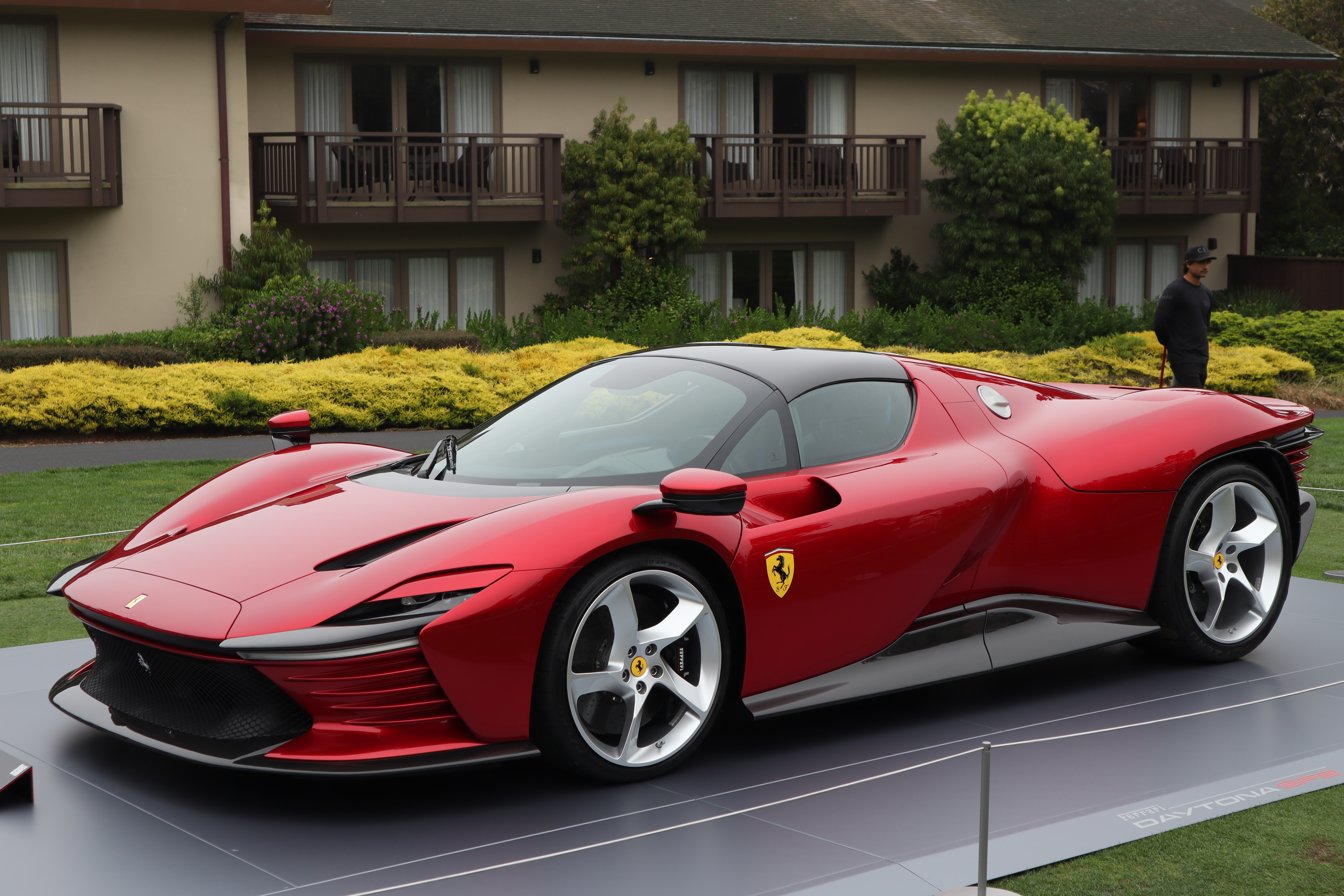

Overview
- Manufacturer: Ferrari
- Production: 2022–2025
- Model years: 2023–2025
- Assembly: Italy: Maranello
- Designer: Ferrari Styling Centre under the direction of Flavio Manzoni

Body and chassis
- Class: Sports car (S)
- Body style: 2-door targa top
- Layout: Rear mid-engine, rear-wheel drive
- Platform: LaFerrari Aperta Chassis
- Doors: Butterfly
- Related: Ferrari 812 Superfast; LaFerrari Aperta

Powertrain
- Engine: 6.5 L F140 HC V12
- Power output: 840 PS (618 kW; 829 hp)
- Transmission: 7-speed Magna 7DCL750 dual-clutch

Dimensions
- Wheelbase: 2,651 mm (104.4 in)
- Length: 4,686 mm (184.5 in)
- Width: 2,050 mm (80.7 in)
- Height: 1,142 mm (45.0 in)
- Curb weight: 1,485 kg (3,274 lb) (dry)

The Ferrari Daytona SP3 (Type F251) is a limited production mid-engine sports car produced by the Italian automobile manufacturer Ferrari, unveiled on 20 November 2021 for the 2023 model year. The Daytona SP3 is the latest in the "Icona" series of high-performance cars being produced by Ferrari after the Ferrari Monza SP series. 599 examples were to be built from 2022 and sold for $2.25 million each. The Daytona SP3 is powered by a naturally aspirated 6.5-liter V12 that is shared with the 812 Superfast. The SP3 marks the first return of Ferrari to naturally-aspirated V12, mid-mounted engines for limited edition cars without hybrid electric systems since the Ferrari Enzo, introduced in 2002.

== Design ==
The design of the SP3 references 1960s race cars, with the Daytona SP3 having a characteristic aerodynamically optimized design that blends elements of Ferrari's historic styling with cues from current models. The low-set, wraparound windscreen is a link to the P3/4, while the "double-crested" front wings nod to sports prototypes like the 512 S, 712 Can-Am, and 312 P. The rear view mirrors are mounted on the top of the front wheel fenders, which is an inspiration from the P3 and P4 series.

The design of the Daytona SP3 is based on the Ferrari 330 P4 endurance race car, which won at the 24 hours of Daytona in 1967. The design is a modernization of the 330 P4, with the body work consisting of a distinguished low driver's seating position, raised front and rear wheel arches, and the Targa top design. The design also takes inspiration from the rear air vents of the 1968 250 P5 concept by Pininfarina—which are the signature appearance on the rear of the SP3—consisting of a series of horizontal fins in the front and rear. The front design consists of partially hidden headlamps and a light strip along the front edge lines of the car. The headlights incorporate a partial cover plate, which covers the top half of the lights. When the lights are turned on, the cover plate retracts.

== Specifications ==
=== Engine and transmission ===
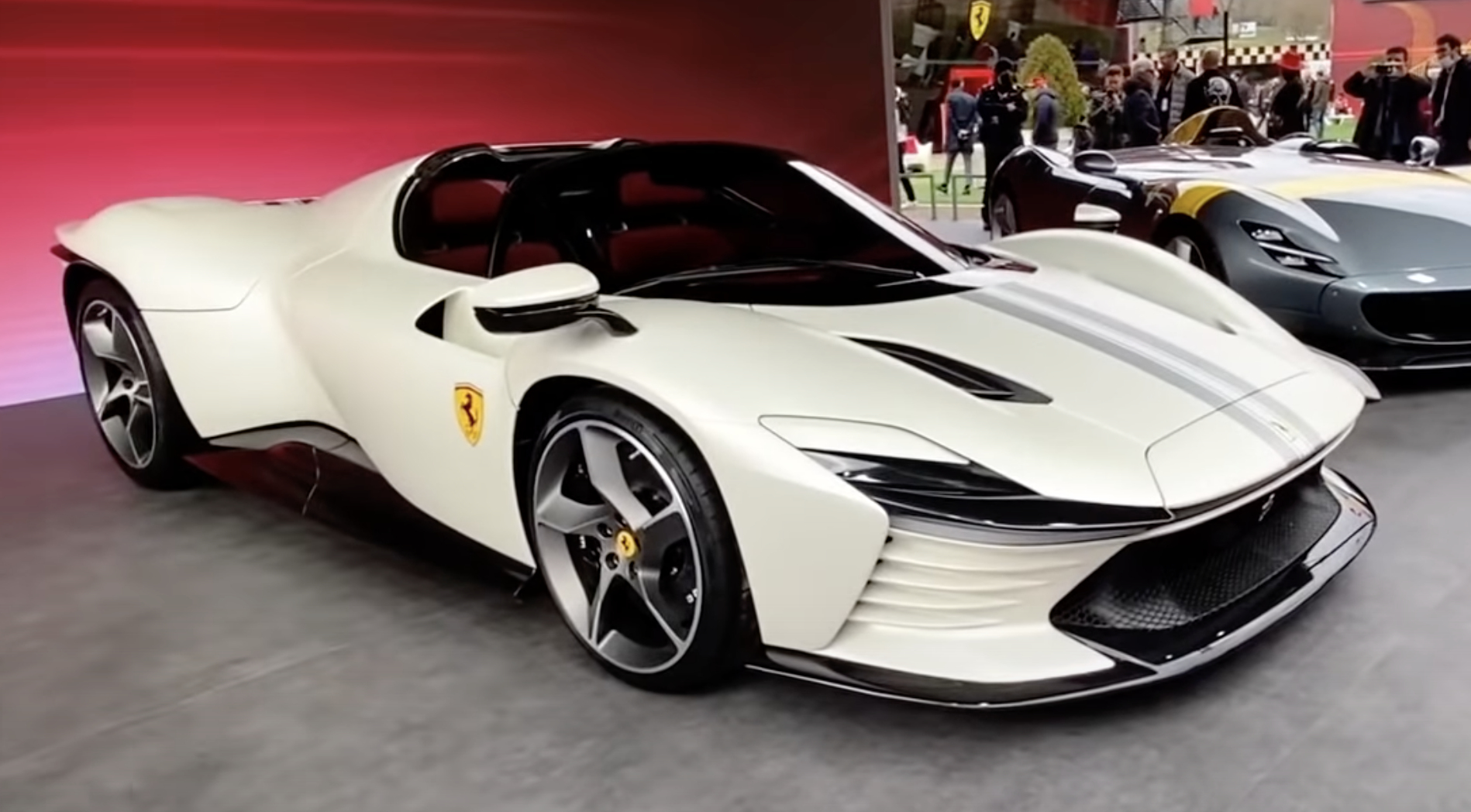
Daytona SP3 at Ferrari Finali Mondiali

The engine is a naturally aspirated 6.5 L Ferrari F140 HC V12, which has a redline of 9500 rpm. It generates 840 PS (618 kW; 829 hp) at 9250 rpm and 697 N⋅m (514 lb⋅ft) of torque at 7250 rpm. The Daytona SP3 is the first road-going Ferrari to feature a mid-mounted 12-cylinder engine without electric hybrid support systems since the Ferrari Enzo in 2002. The engine is mated to a quicker-shifting version of the 812 Competizione's 7-speed automatic dual-clutch gearbox. To enable the car to put the power down efficiently, Ferrari has equipped the transmission with an e-diff and lots of electronics including Side Slip Control (SSC) 6.1 with Ferrari Dynamic Enhancer (FDE). The gear shifts requires less than 200 milliseconds to change between gears.

This also marks the last usage of the mid-ship V12 engine for the Ferrari road cars, as the company is departing from traditional V12s to lower cylinder variants such as turbocharged V8s with hybrid electric systems similar to the SF90 Stradale, which is already in production.

=== Chassis ===
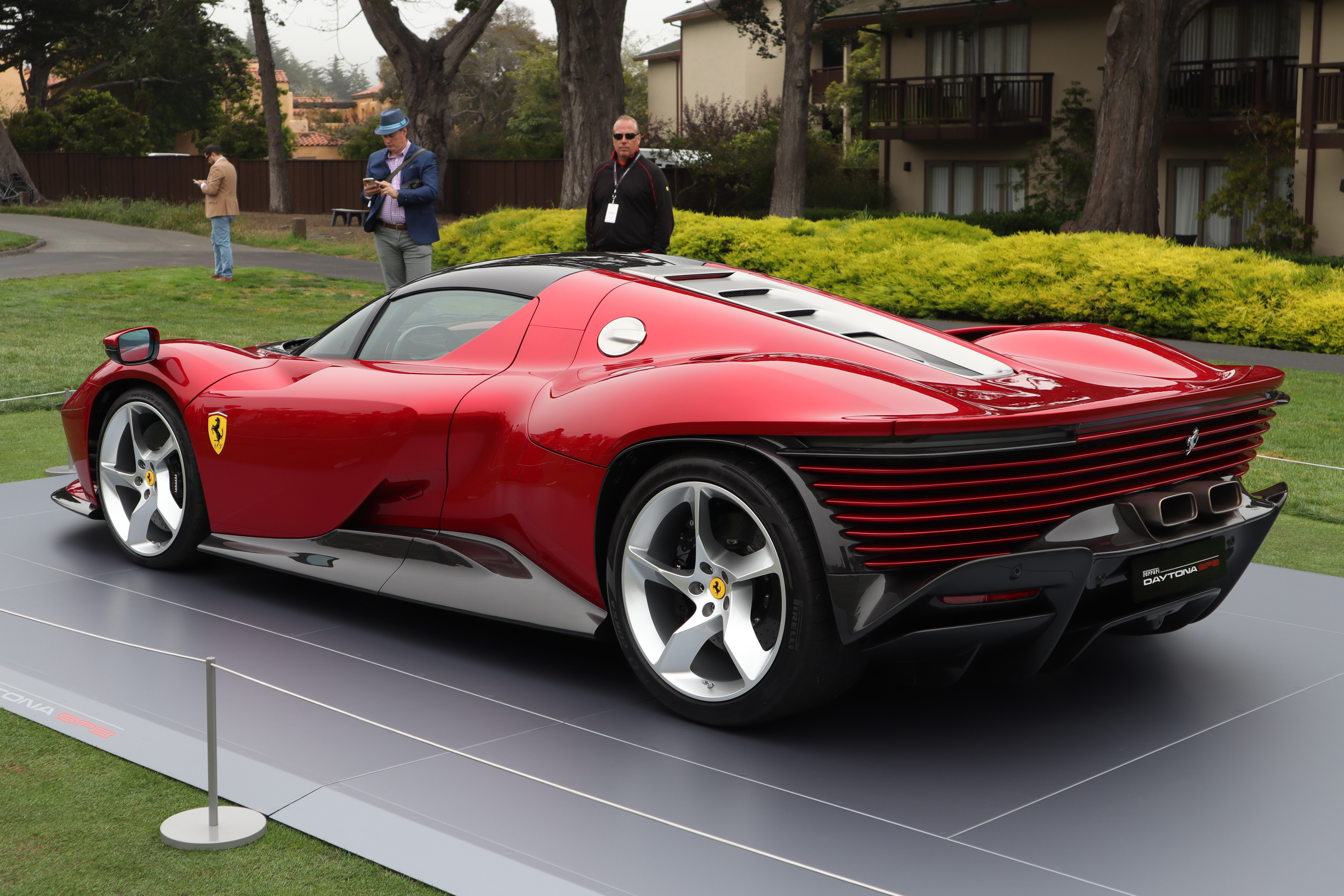
Daytona SP3 rear view

The SP3 bodywork sits on the LaFerrari Aperta chassis, with carbon fiber used for the shell, chassis and certain bodywork elements. The car weighs 1,485 kg dry, giving it a power-to-weight ratio of 566 PS per ton, while the mid-engined layout allows optimized weight distribution between the axles. The body work makes use of an "Aperta" style roof, which can be removed and stored separately. The chassis also consists of butterfly doors that open upwards, similar to the LaFerrari and Enzo. Ferrari claims that the car has a weight distribution split of 44% front and 56% rear.

=== Performance ===
The SP3 can accelerate from 0-100 km/h (62 mph) in 2.85 seconds, 0-200 km/h (124 mph) in 7.4 seconds, and can reach a top speed of more than 340 km/h (211 mph). Its timing around Ferrari's Fiorano test track remains untested, with the SF90 being the current fastest car. The SP3 has an EPA rated fuel economy of 12/16 city/highway, and 13 mpg_{‑US} (18.1 L/100 km; 15.6 mpg_{‑imp}) combined.

=== Wheels and brakes ===
The SP3 uses Pirelli P Zero Corsa tires on custom Ferrari wheels with 265/30 ZR 20 J9.0 in the front and 345/30 ZR 21 J12.5 in the rear. The brakes are from Brembo measuring 398 x 223 x 36 mm in the front and 380 x 253 x 34 mm in the rear.

=== Electronics ===
The SP3 makes use of multiple electronic systems such as ESC, high performance ABS e/EBD, F1-Trac, e-Diff 3.0, SCM-Frs, and SSC (Side Slip Control) 6.1.

=== Interior ===
Dashboard

The SP3 consists of an all-new minimalistic ergonomic interior with a carbon fiber dashboard with an Alcantara finish on top and a LED display system for data and telemetry. Touch controls mean that drivers can control 80% of the Daytona SP3's functions without moving their hands, while a 16" curved HD screen instantly relays driving-related information. The steering column is vertically adjustable to accommodate additional leg room for taller drivers. The center console design is inspired by the gated manual transmission design of classic Ferraris and consists of performance control switch clusters.

Steering wheel

The carbon fiber flat-bottom steering wheel is an advanced version of the Ferrari Roma's, with multiple performance and feature control touch buttons. It retains the traditional Manettino dial for selection of various driving modes. It also consists of the gear shifting light strip at the top of the wheel to indicate optimal gear shifts.

Seats

The seats are new and have an ergonomic wraparound design; they provide a snug fit for the driver and passenger for comfortable yet secure seating. The seat design consists of a two-piece setup with the main seat bucket and the headrest as a separate unit. As the seats are not adjustable, similar to the Enzo and LaFerrari, the pedal box can be adjusted by moving it forward or backward to adjust to the driver's leg space.

=== Aerodynamics ===
The SP3 makes use of passive aerodynamics to generate downforce. Ferrari chief technology officer Michael Leiters says the Daytona SP3 generates around 500 lb (230 kg) of downforce at 125 mph (201 km/h) without any active aerodynamic devices. The radiator cooling duct design is revised and now located inside the door trim, similar to the McLaren P1, which does not require external cooling ducts behind the door, as seen in previous Ferrari models.

== Marketing ==
The Daytona SP3 was fully unveiled at the Finali Mondiali Ferrari event, which also included Corsa Clienti cars on 22 November 2021 at the Mugello Circuit. The SP3 was taken on a lap of the track with two 330 P4s (chassis 0856 and chassis 0858) and a 412 P (chassis 0844) in photo finish, to commemorate Ferrari's 1-2-3 win at the 24 Hours of Daytona in 1967.

Ferrari's marketing and sales head, Enrico Galliera, confirmed that all 599 examples of the SP3 have already been sold by invitation to previous Ferrari owners for around $2.25 million each, following the tradition of limited edition Ferraris being sold even before manufacturing started. All 499 owners of the Monza SP1 and SP2 have also purchased the SP3. The remaining 100 examples have been sold to private collectors who own previous limited edition Ferraris. A hypercar owner claimed a required £30 million Ferrari purchase history to be invited to purchase an SP3.

A 600th example was built and sold at 2025 Monterey Car Week with all proceeds going to The Ferrari Foundation. RM Sotheby's auctioned the SP3 dubbed 'Tailor Made' and finished in a unique two-tone black and yellow livery for 26,000,000 USD.
