= Flavio Manzoni =

Italian architect and automobile designer (born 1965)

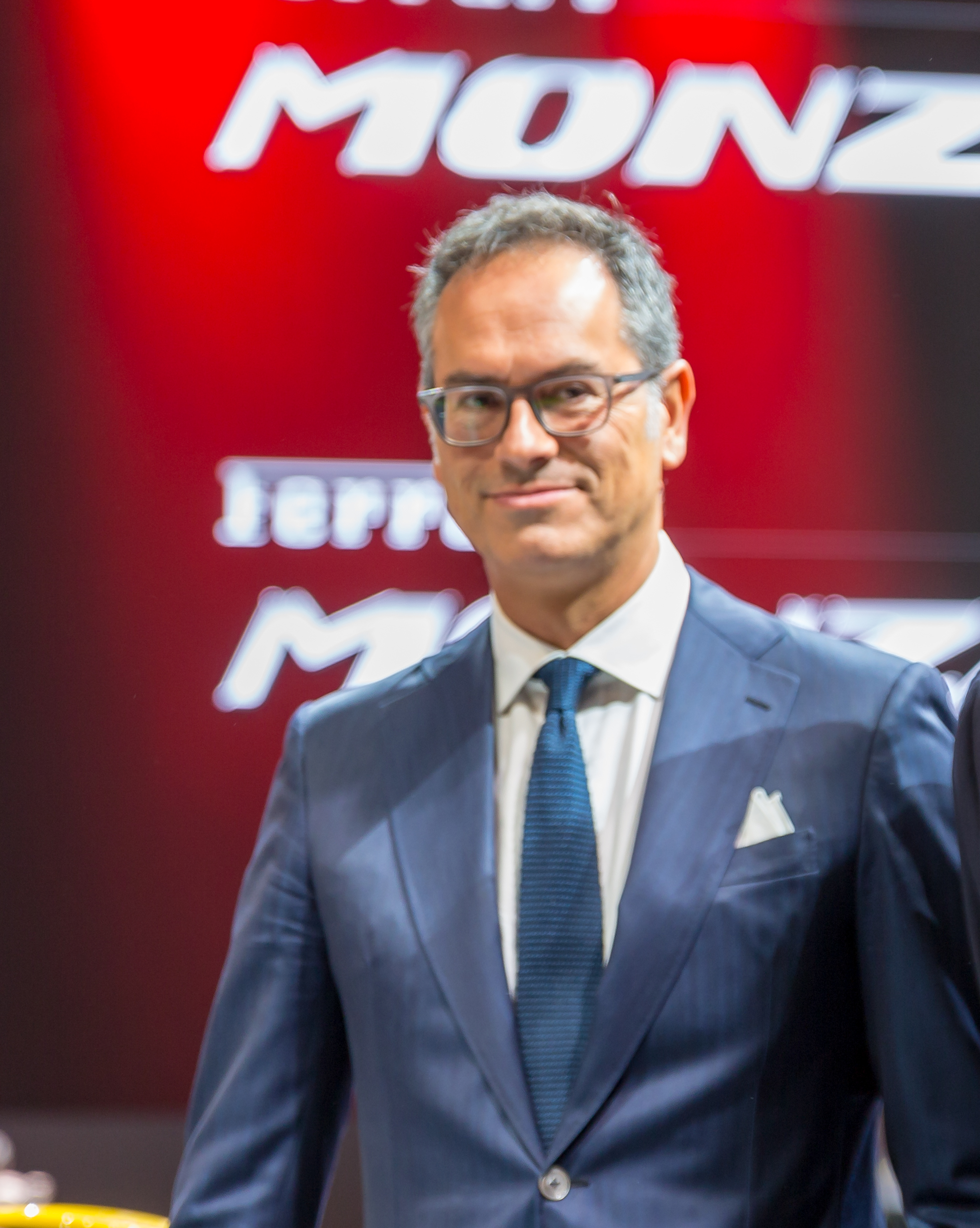
- Manzoni at the 2018 Paris Motor Show
- Born: 7 January 1965 (age 61); Nuoro, Italy
- Education: University of Florence
- Occupations: Ferrari Styling Centre, SVP
- Awards: Compasso d'oro 2014; Compasso d'oro 2016; Compasso d'oro 2020; Compasso d'oro 2024

Flavio Manzoni (born 7 January 1965 in Nuoro, Sardinia) is an Italian architect and automobile designer. He has held the position of Chief Design Officer at Ferrari since January 2010, leading the development of many Ferrari models, including the LaFerrari.

His influence in the automotive world is significant, having led the creation of several successful Ferrari models.

Among his most celebrated projects:

- The F12berlinetta, created in collaboration with Pininfarina and the Ferrari Styling Center, which earned him the Compasso d'Oro in 2014.
- The FXX K, which received the Compasso d'Oro in 2016.
- The Monza SP1, awarded the Compasso d'Oro in 2020.
- The Ferrari J50, for which he received a Red Dot Award in 2017.
- The Ferrari Purosangue, awarded the Compasso d'Oro in 2024.

Before joining Ferrari, Manzoni contributed to the design of Lancia and Maserati cars. He also served as the creative director of the Volkswagen Group during the 2000s and 2009. His passion for automotive design and his creative vision continue to significantly impact the industry.

== Career ==
Manzoni studied architecture at University of Florence, specializing in industrial design. In 1993 he joined the Centro Stile Lancia, and three years later he was made responsible for interior design of the marque. He worked on various projects such as the interiors of the Lancia Dialogos, Lancia Thesis and Maserati 3200 GT. In 1999, he moved to Barcelona to become Interior Design Director at SEAT, and working in the interiors of the production cars SEAT Altea and SEAT León, and the concept cars SEAT Salsa and SEAT Tango.

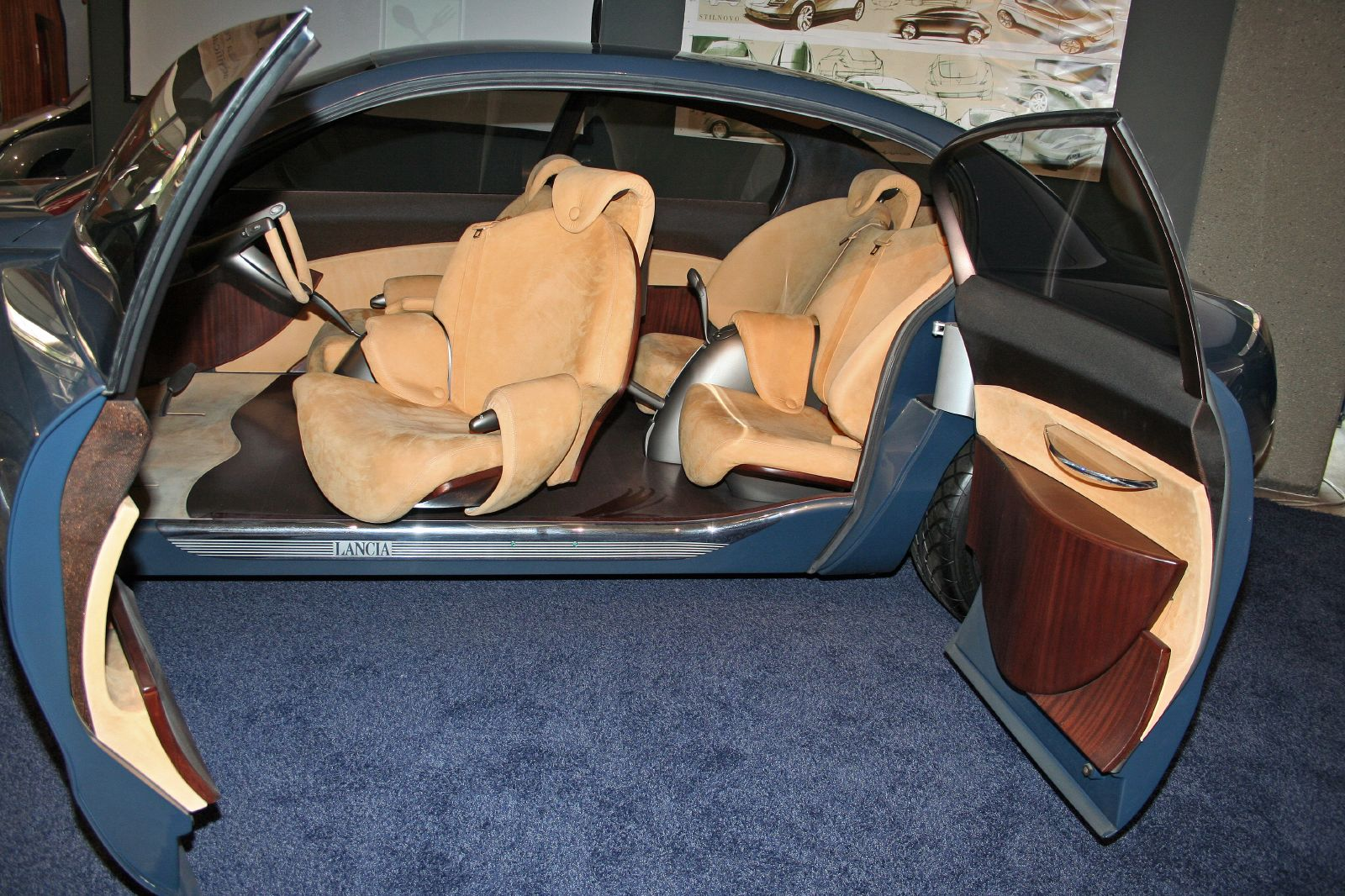
Lancia Dialogos interior

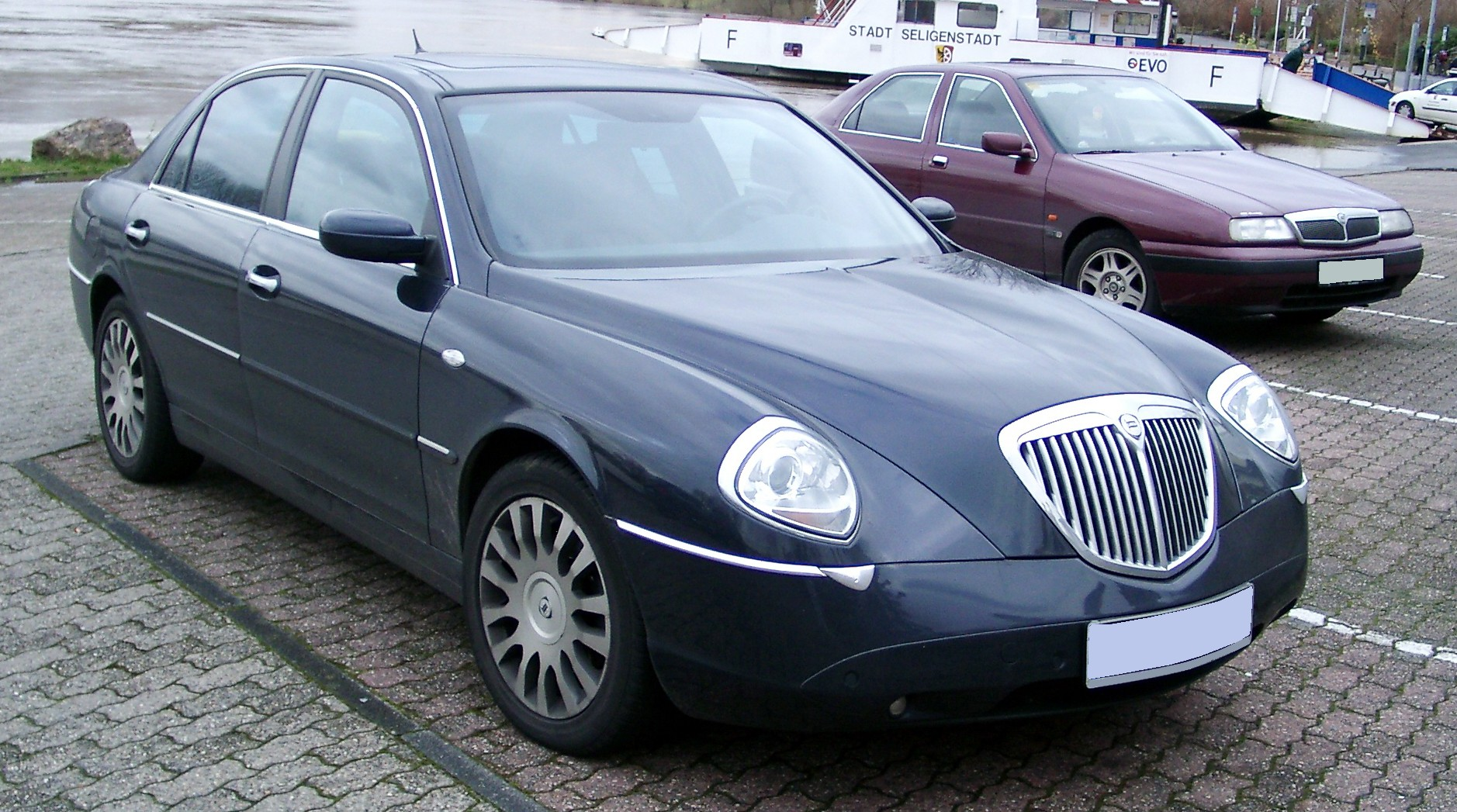
Lancia Thesis (interiors)

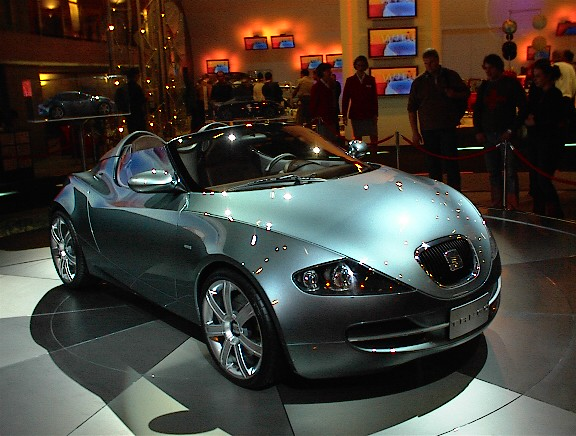
SEAT Tango

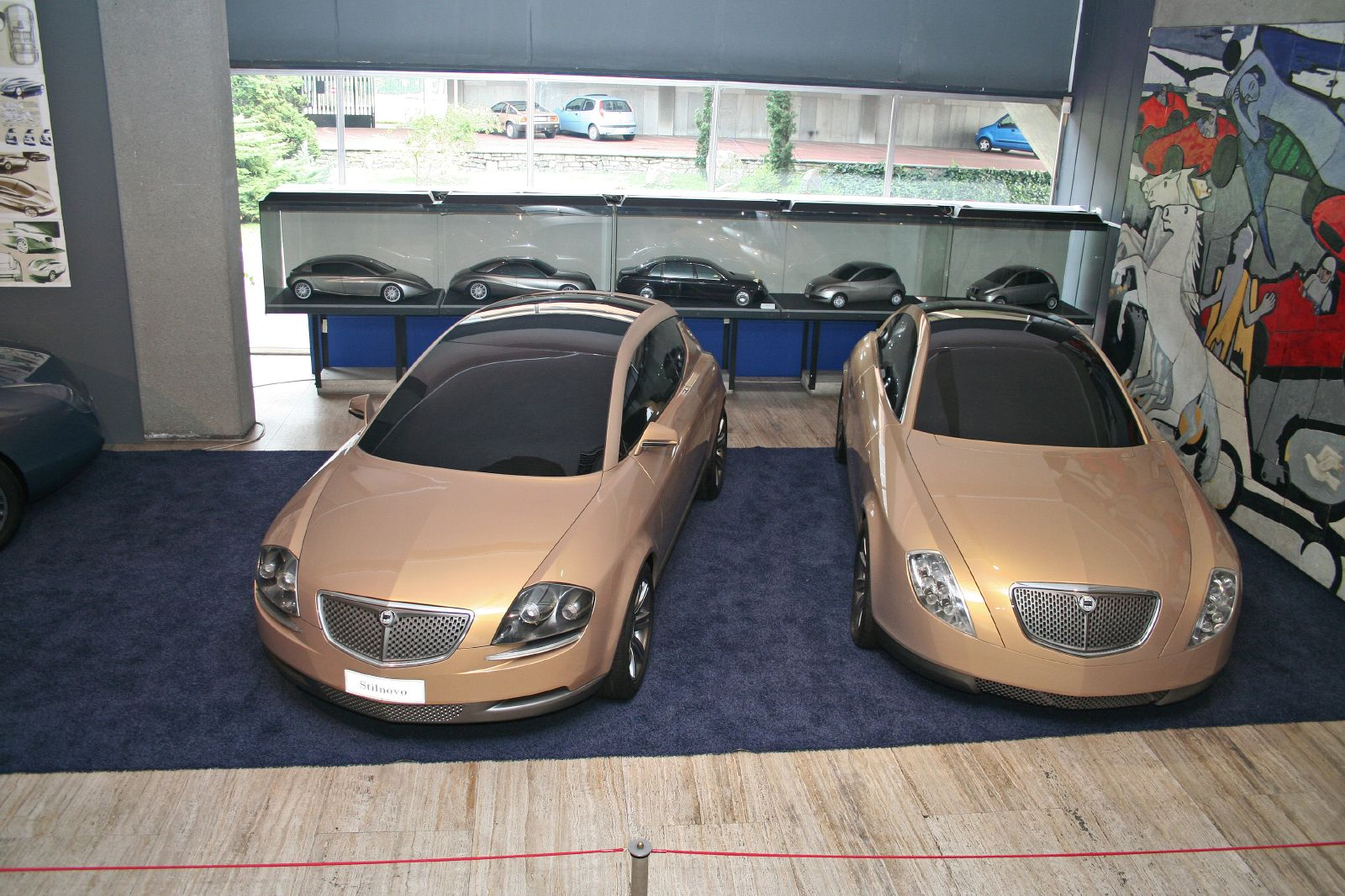
Concept Lancia Stilnovo et Lancia Granturismo Stilnovo

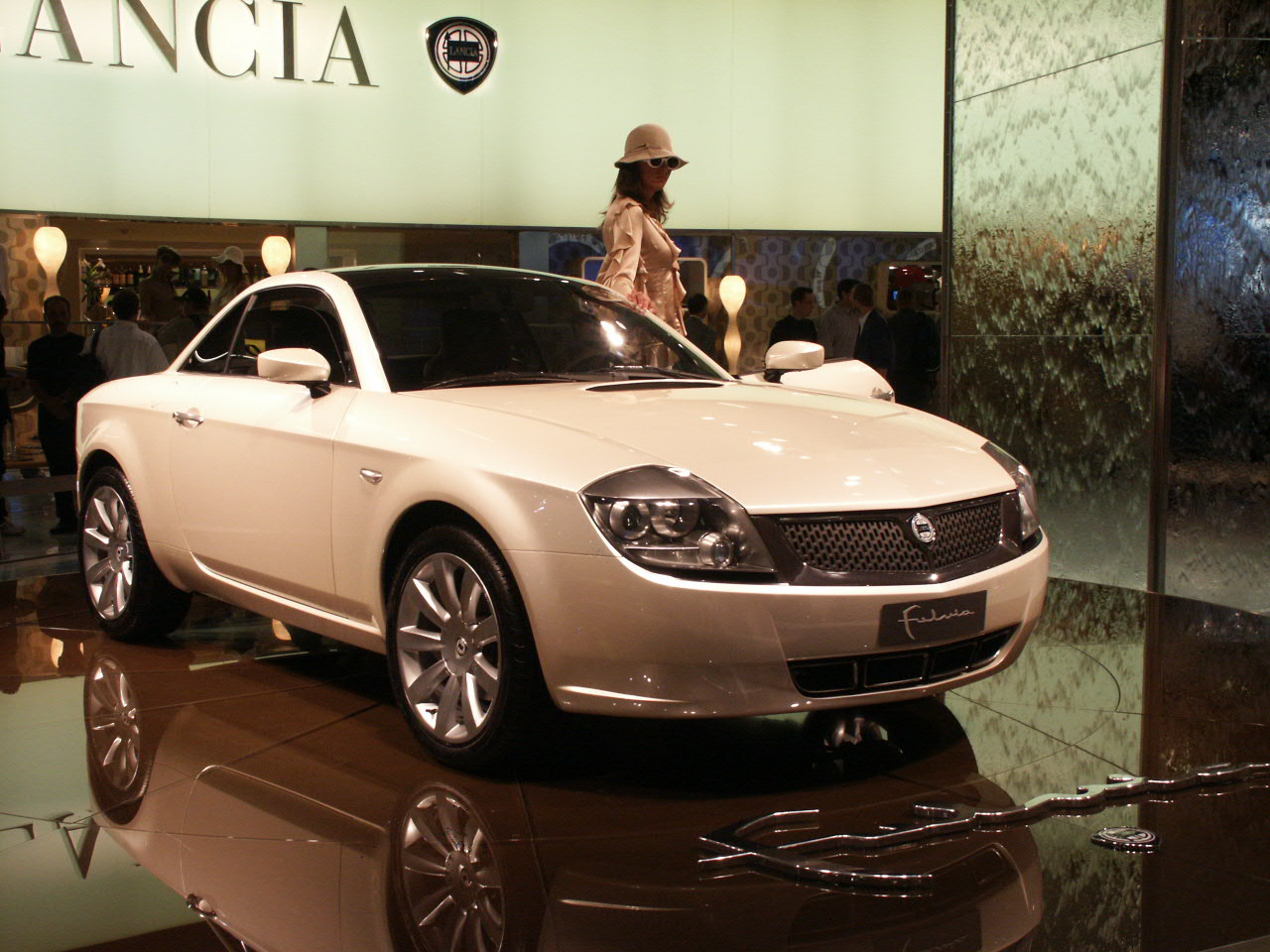
Concept Lancia Fulvia Coupé

In 2001 Manzoni returned to Lancia and was appointed Design Director. He took charge of the concept cars Lancia Granturismo, Lancia Granturismo Stilnovo and Lancia Fulvia Coupé Concept, great success at the Frankfurt Motor Show in 2003, and the production cars Lancia Ypsilon and Lancia Musa, winning the '"European Automotive Design Award" in 2003.

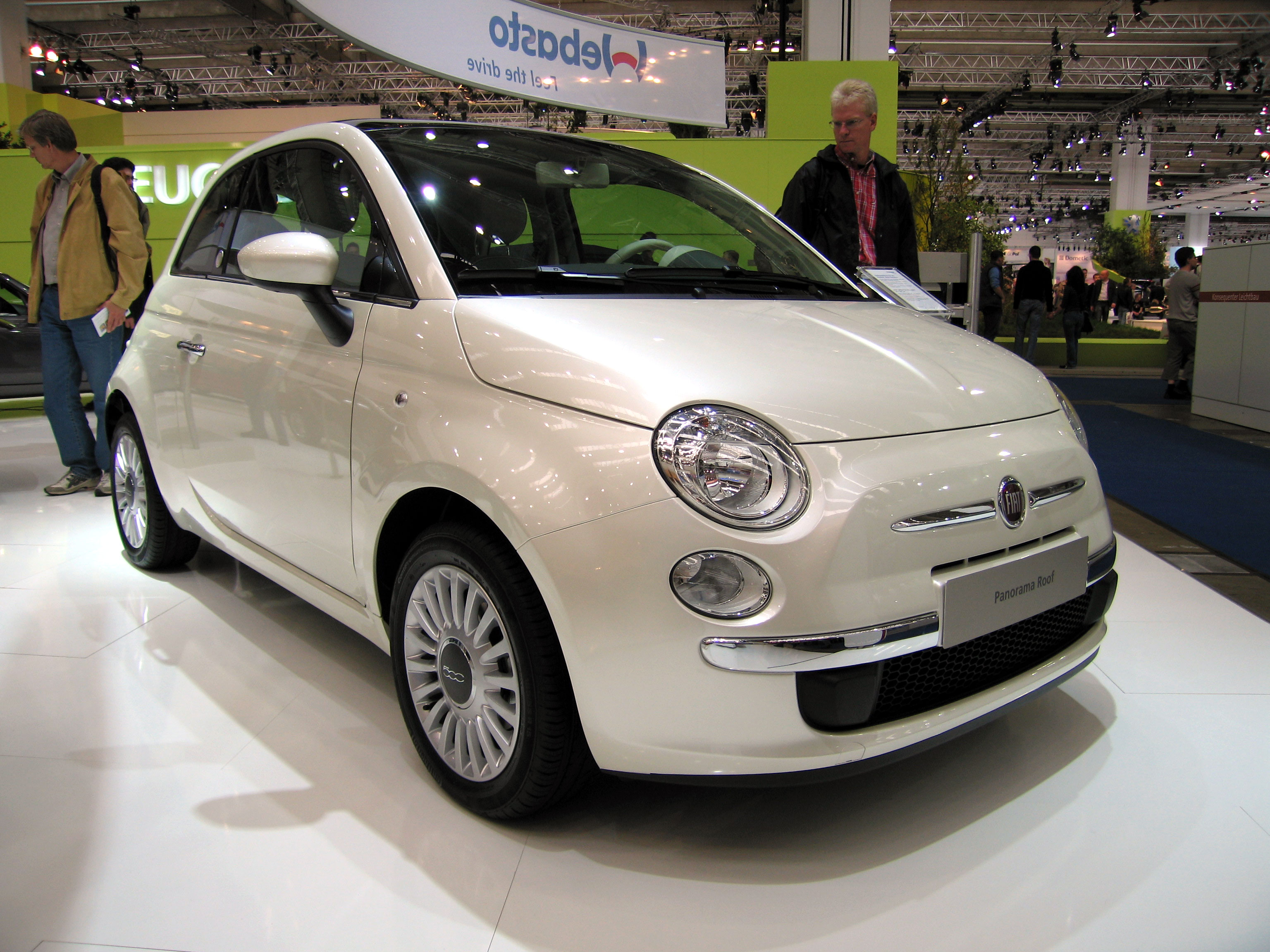
Fiat 500 (2007)

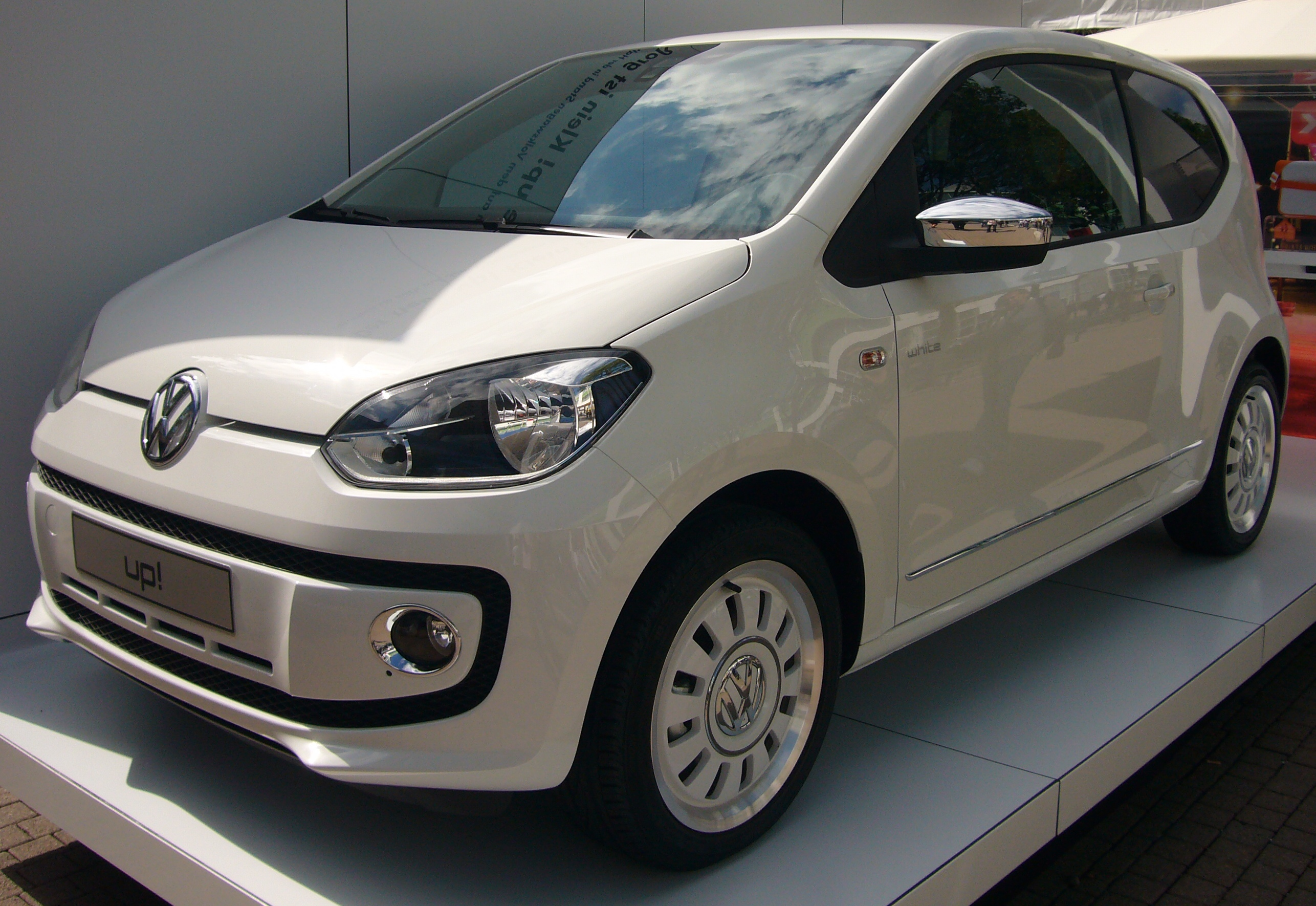
Volkswagen up!

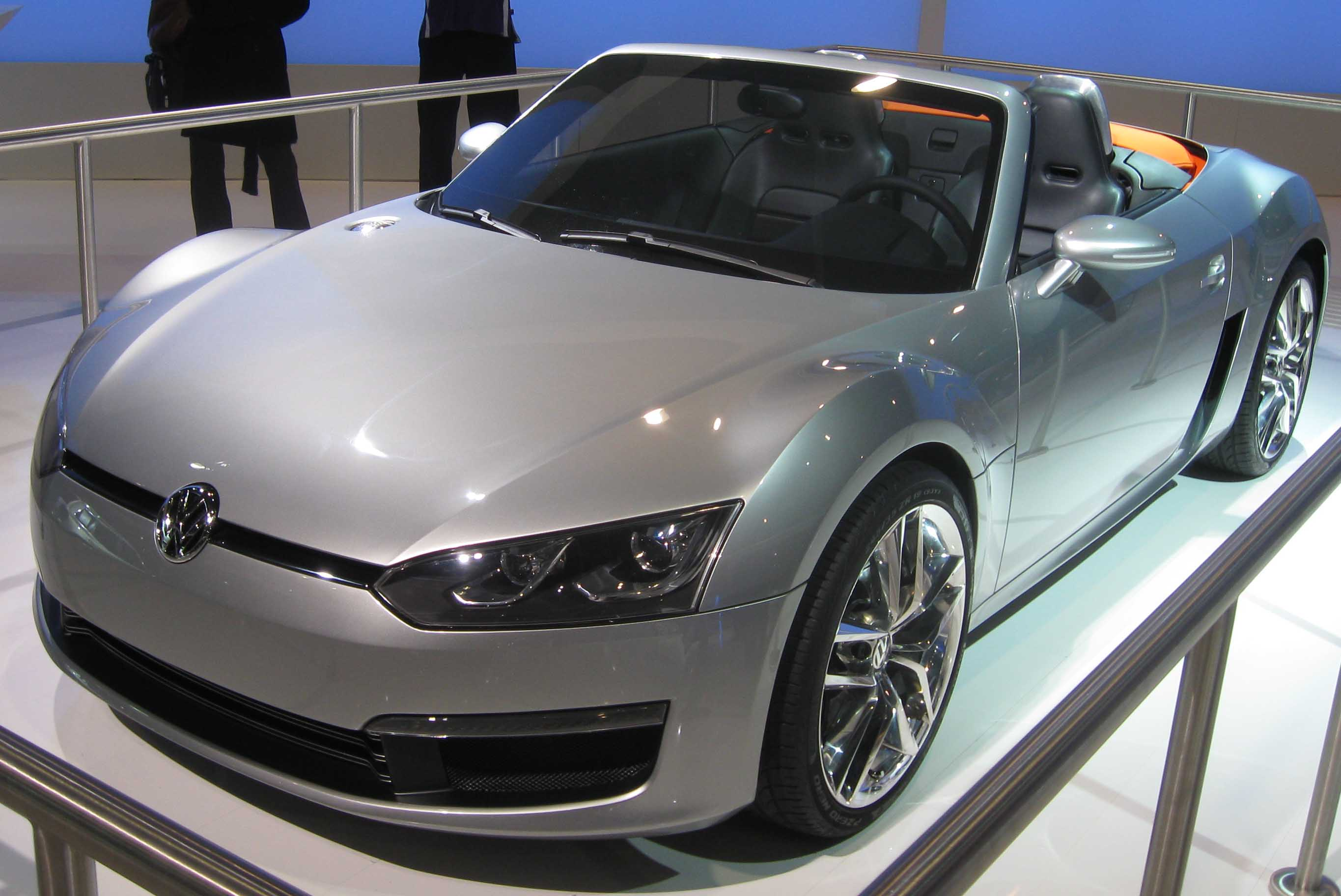
Volkswagen BlueSport Concept

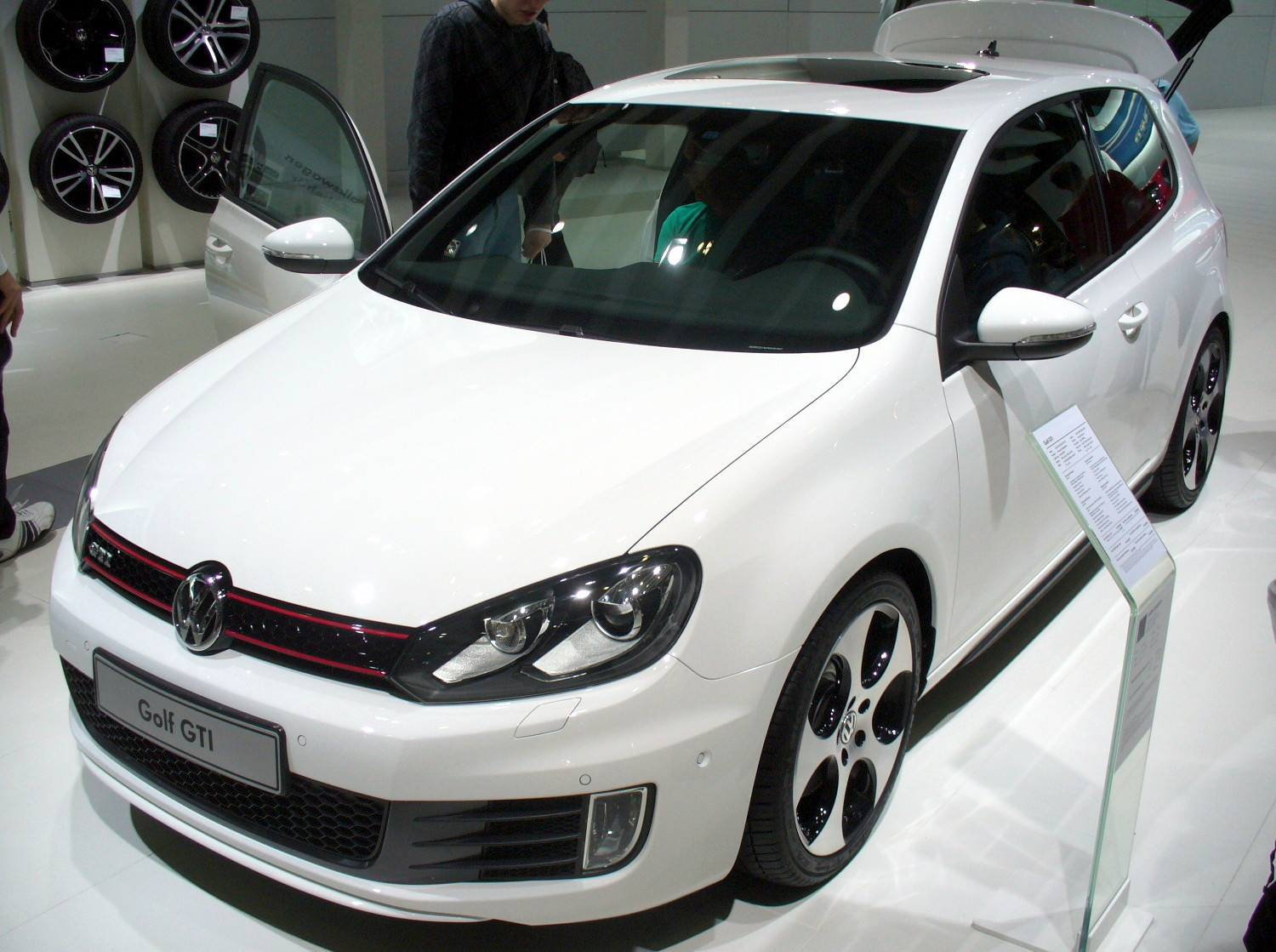
Volkswagen Golf VI

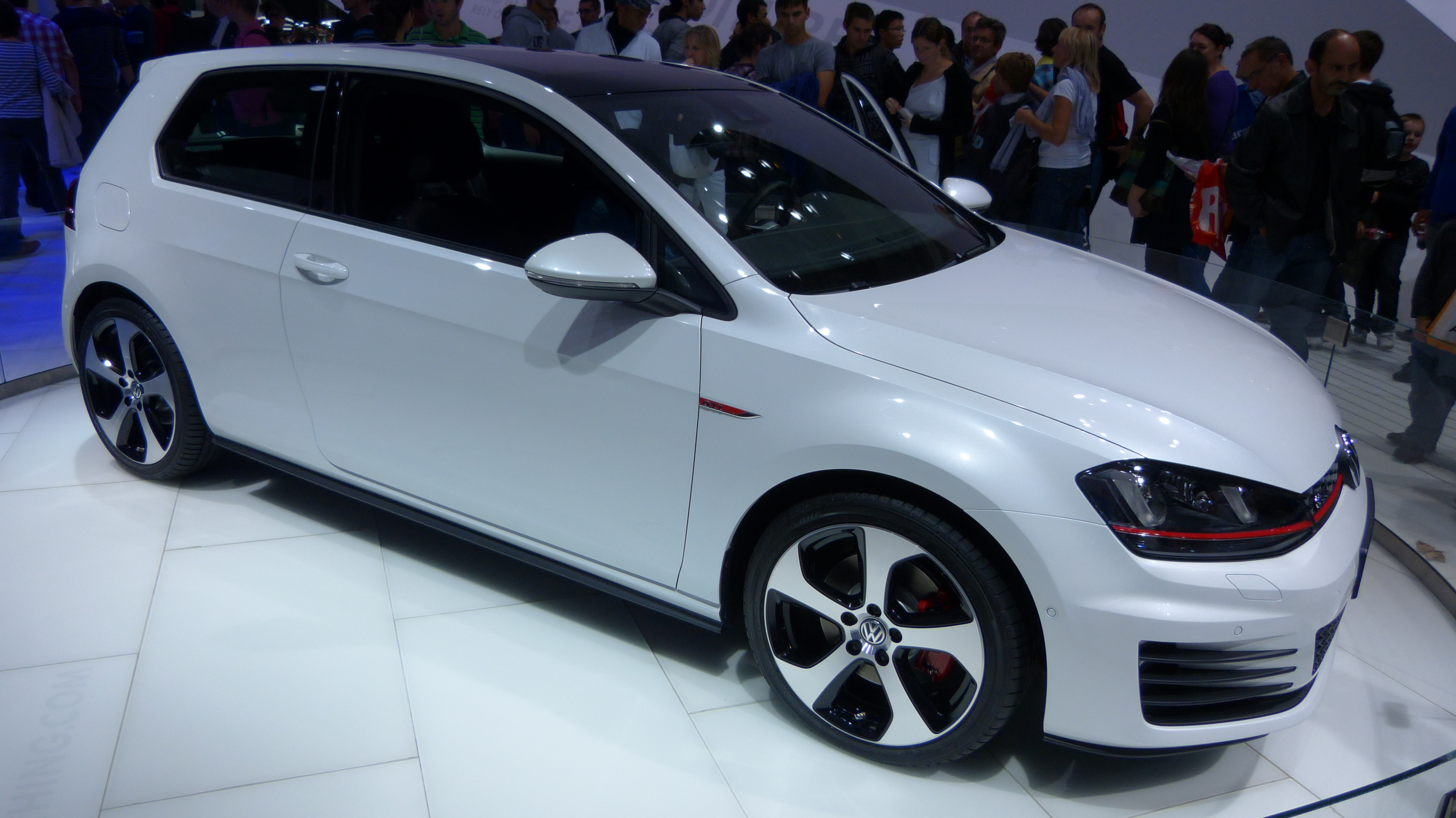
Volkswagen Golf VII

In 2004 he was appointed Director of Design of Fiat, Lancia and Fiat LCV, beginning work on the Fiat Grande Punto, the new Fiat 500, and the Fiat Fiorino/Qubo.

In 2006, with other authors, he wrote L'automobile italiana published by Giunti Editore. The same year, he moved to the Volkswagen group joining Audi, becoming in February 2007 the artistic director of the Volkswagen group "north" pole, where he began to work on a new stylistic image of the Volkswagen, Skoda, Bentley and Bugatti brands. He designed the concept Up!, followed by the Scirocco model and the Volkswagen Golf restyling, called Golf VI, presenting the "Golf Plus" version at 2008 Bologna Motorshow. Also in 2007 he became a member of the iF-Award Product Design jury.

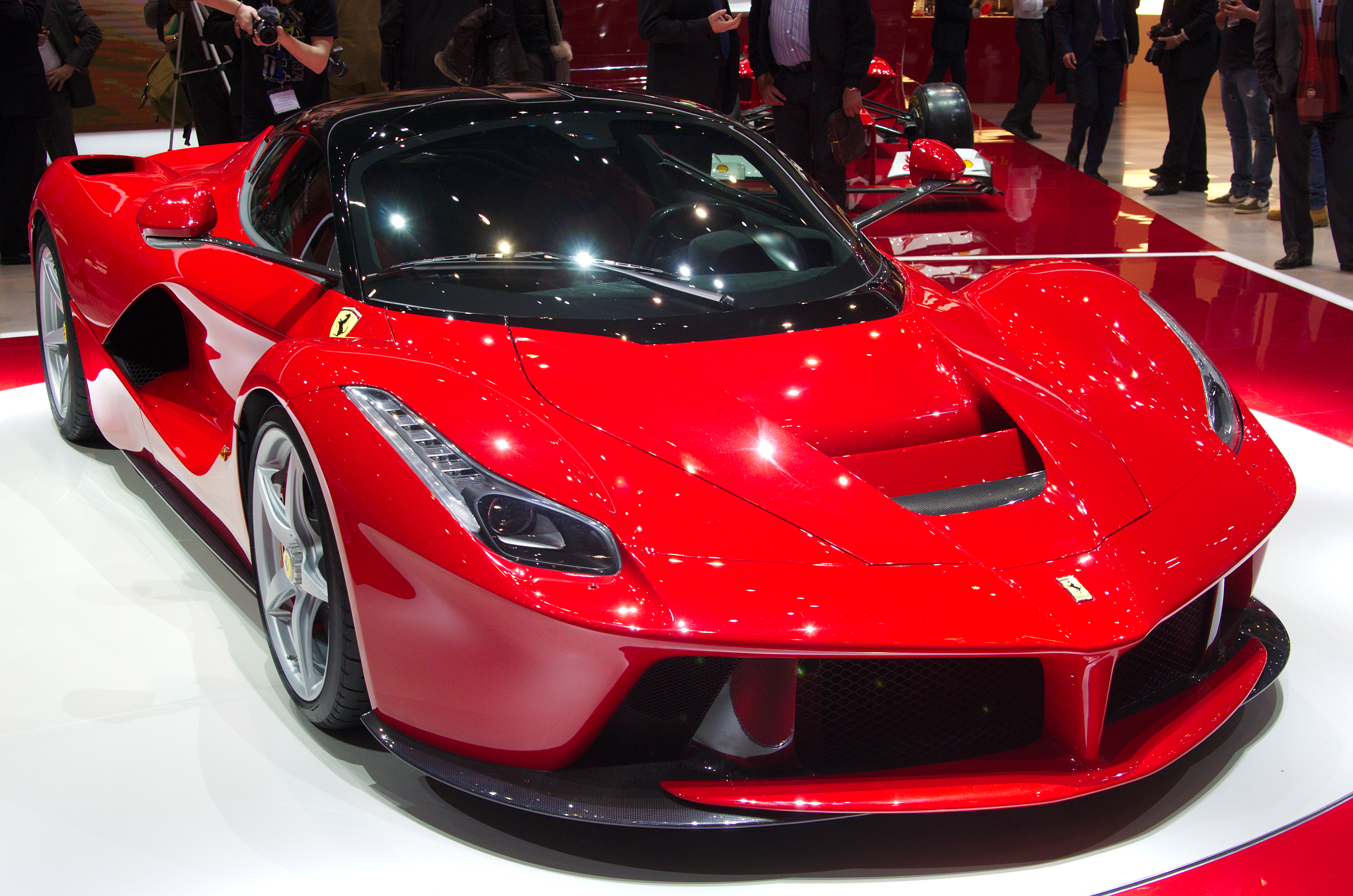
LaFerrari

From 12 January 2010 he joined Ferrari as director of design, replacing Donato Coco and creating an internal, complete and autonomous Style Center for the first time in the history of the brand. Ferrari FF is the first production car he oversee development with. He presented the Ferrari SA Aperta roadster at the 2010 Paris Motor Show. In 2012, at the Geneva Motor Show, he presented the Ferrari F12berlinetta, heir of the Ferrari 599 GTB Fiorano and the first Ferrari developed by the Ferrari Style Center in collaboration with Pininfarina. Thanks to F12berlinetta he won the Auto Bild Design Award 2012, as the most beautiful car in Europe, and the Golden Steering Wheel. In 2013 he made the heir of Enzo Ferrari: La Ferrari. He oversaw the lightening and aerodynamic redesign of the Ferrari 458 Speciale. In 2011 Flavio Manzoni was included into the Automobile Design Hall of Fame at the National Automobile Museum in Turin, Italy.

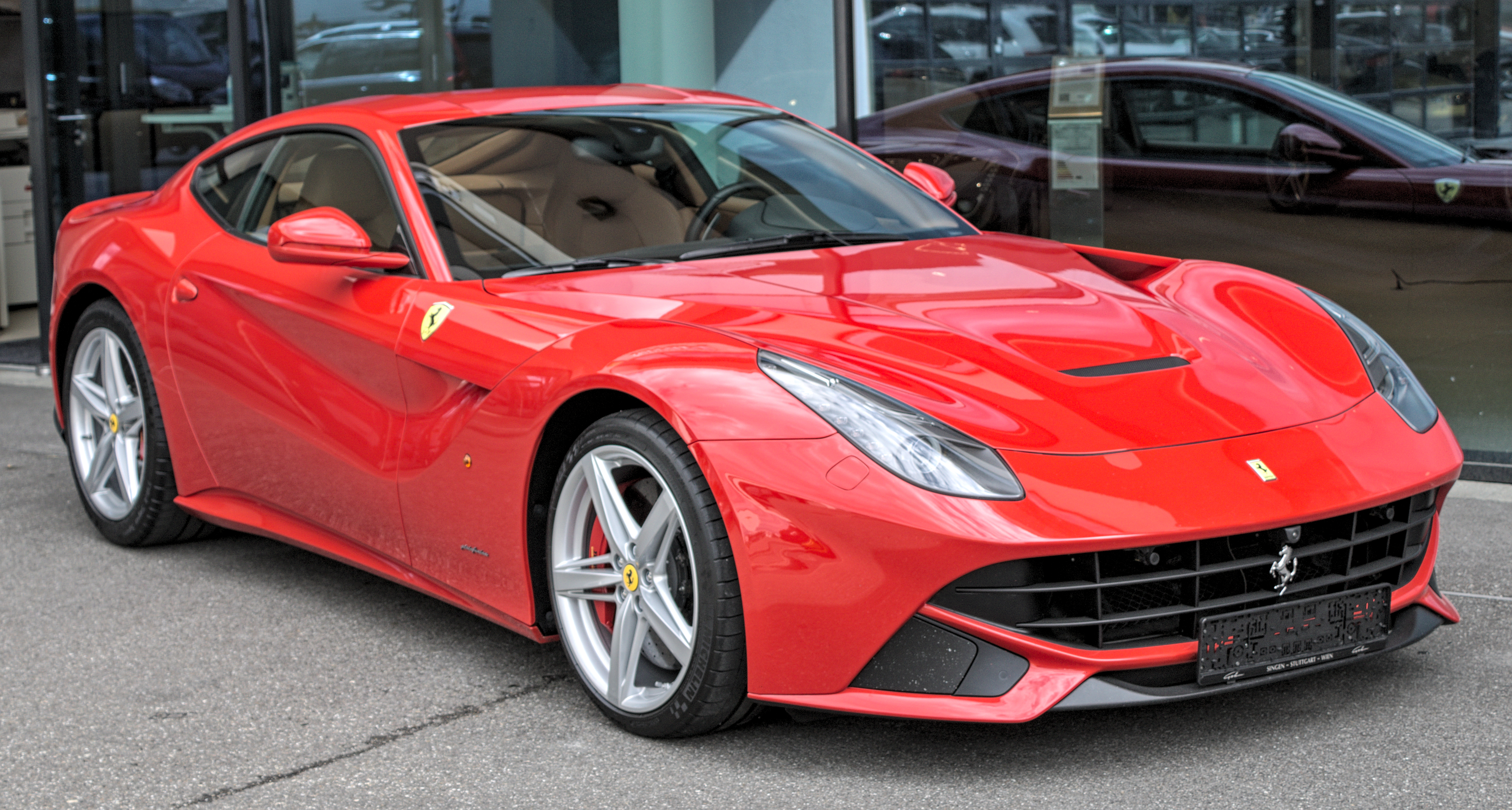
Ferrari F12berlinetta designed in collaboration with Pininfarina

In May 2014 he received the Compasso d'Oro award in the name of Ferrari, which rewards the combination of technology and design of the Ferrari F12 Berlinetta.

In December 2014 on Yas Marina Circuit in Abu Dhabi, his FXX-K was presented as the most powerful Ferrari ever. Although partially based on the very first hybrid car produced in Maranello, LaFerrari, the FXX-K is in fact a completely new car.

In December 2016 the Ferrari J50 was presented in Tokyo. Designed by Flavio Manzoni together with the Ferrari style center, it is a sports car produced in a limited edition to celebrate Ferrari's fifty years of presence in Japan. Among his latest works there are the F12 TdF (Tour de France), the most extreme version of the F12berlinetta, the Ferrari GTC4Lusso, sophisticated four-seater 690 HP coupé, the 488GTB sportscar and the 488 Spider open version and the California T, with important technical innovations.

With his team he is directing the project of the "New Ferrari Style Center" in the production site of Ferrari S.p.A. based in Maranello (Modena). Each of the four floors of the new building is dedicated to a different project design stage.

In March 2017, the Ferrari 812 Superfast was presented at the Geneva Motor Show, designed by the Ferrari Style Center led by Flavio Manzoni. In September, the new Ferrari Portofino is presented at the Frankfurt Motor Show.

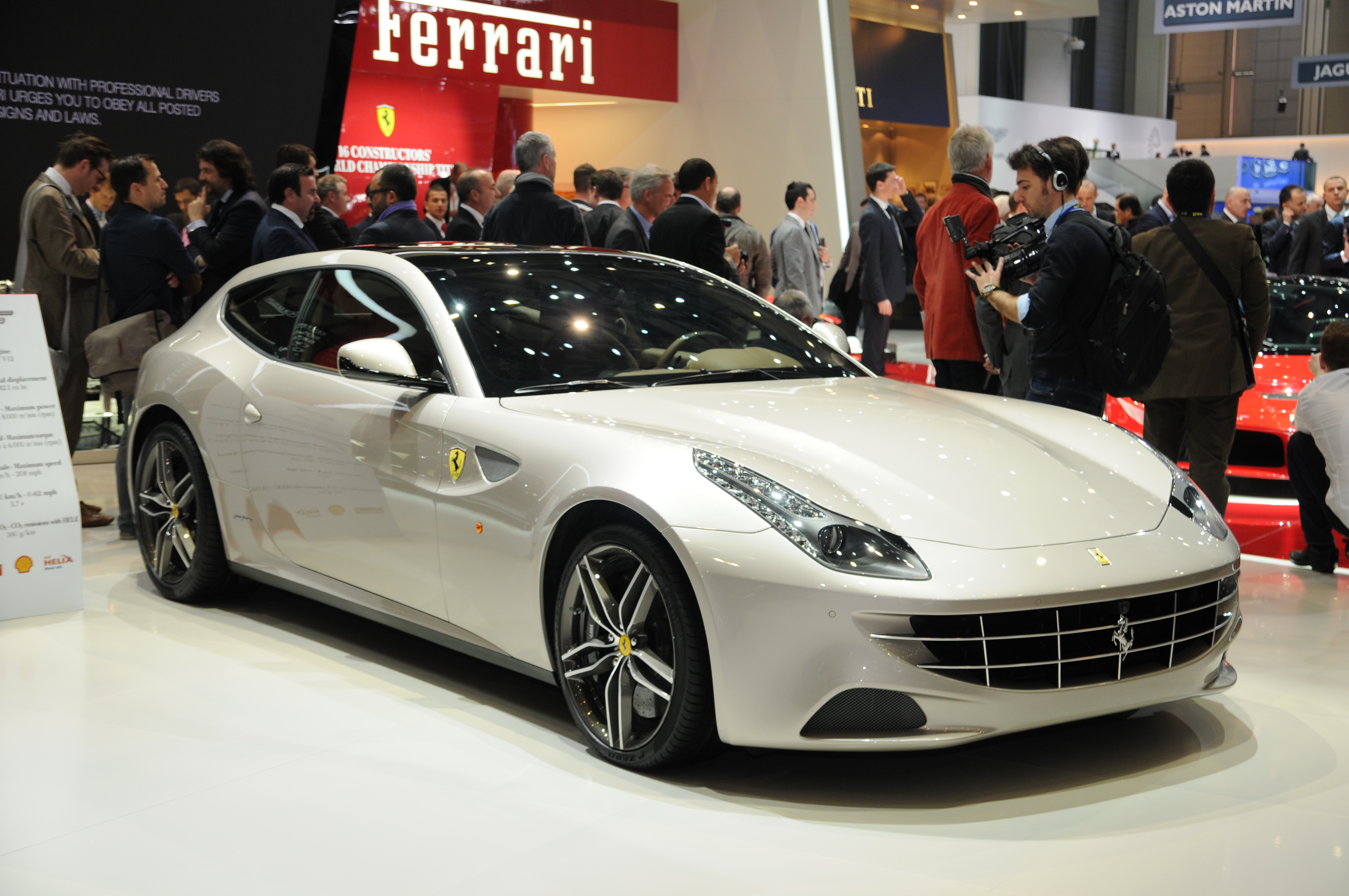
Ferrari FF

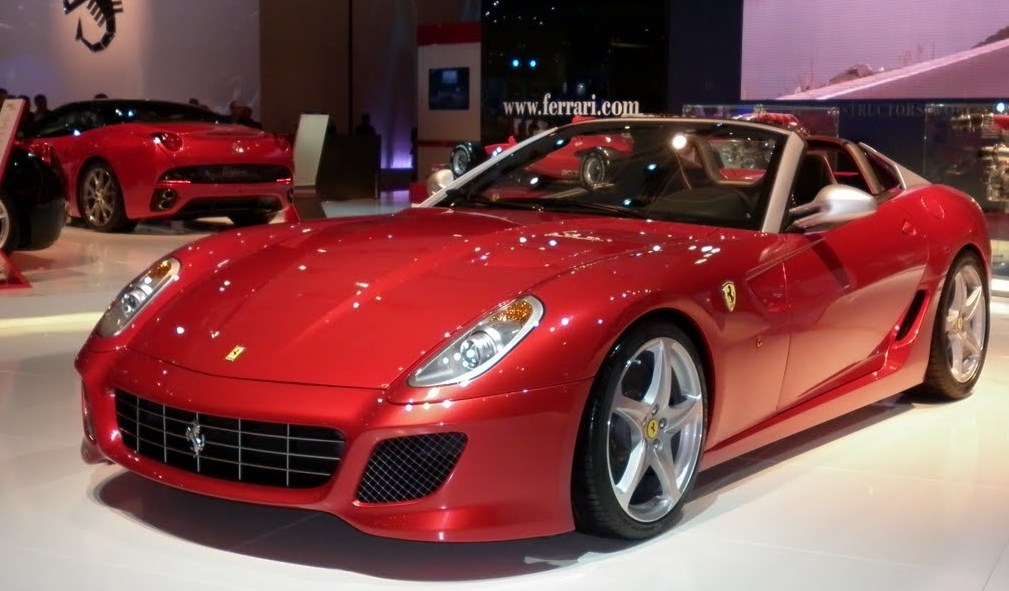
Ferrari SA Aperta

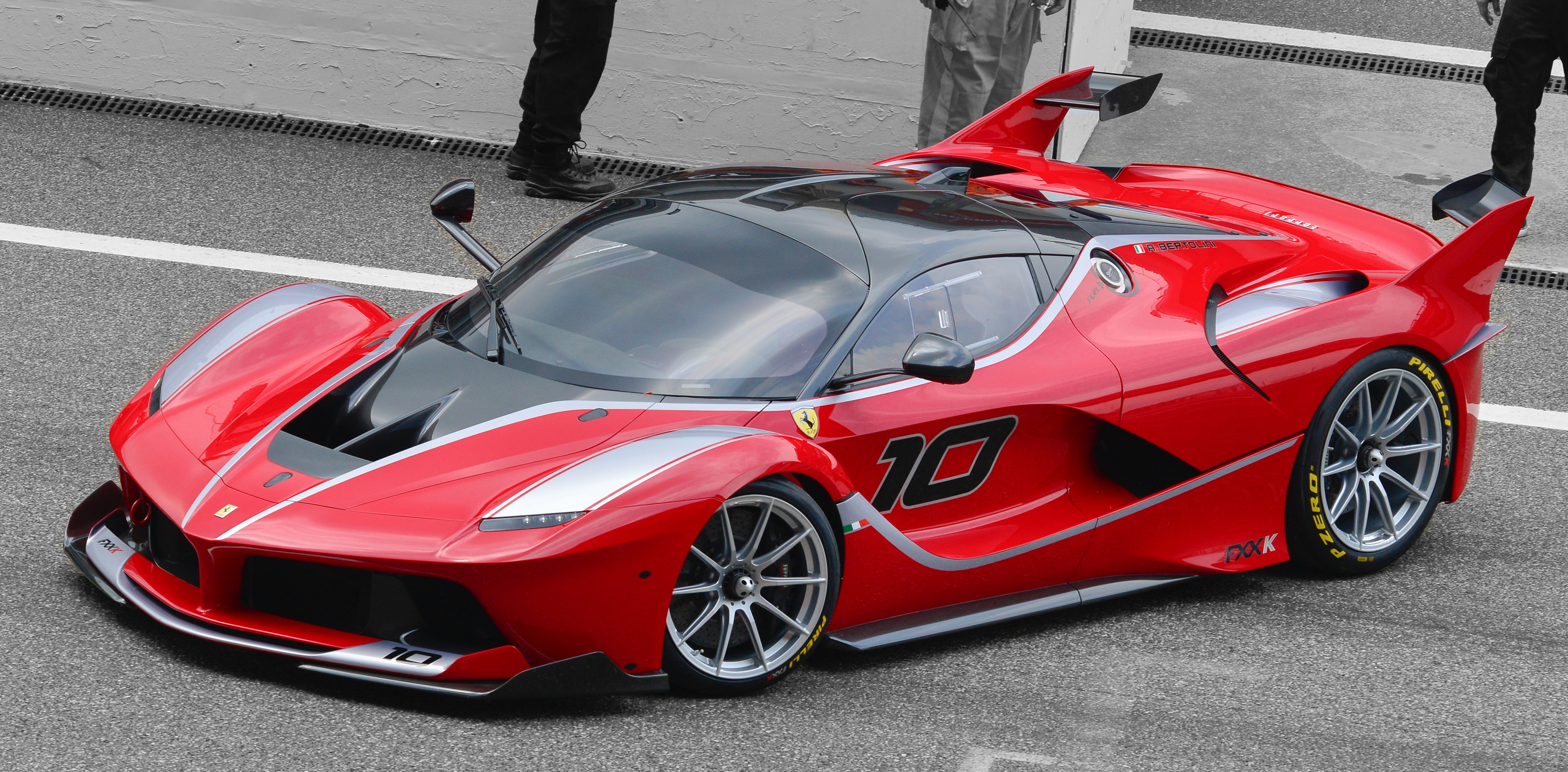
Ferrari FXX-K

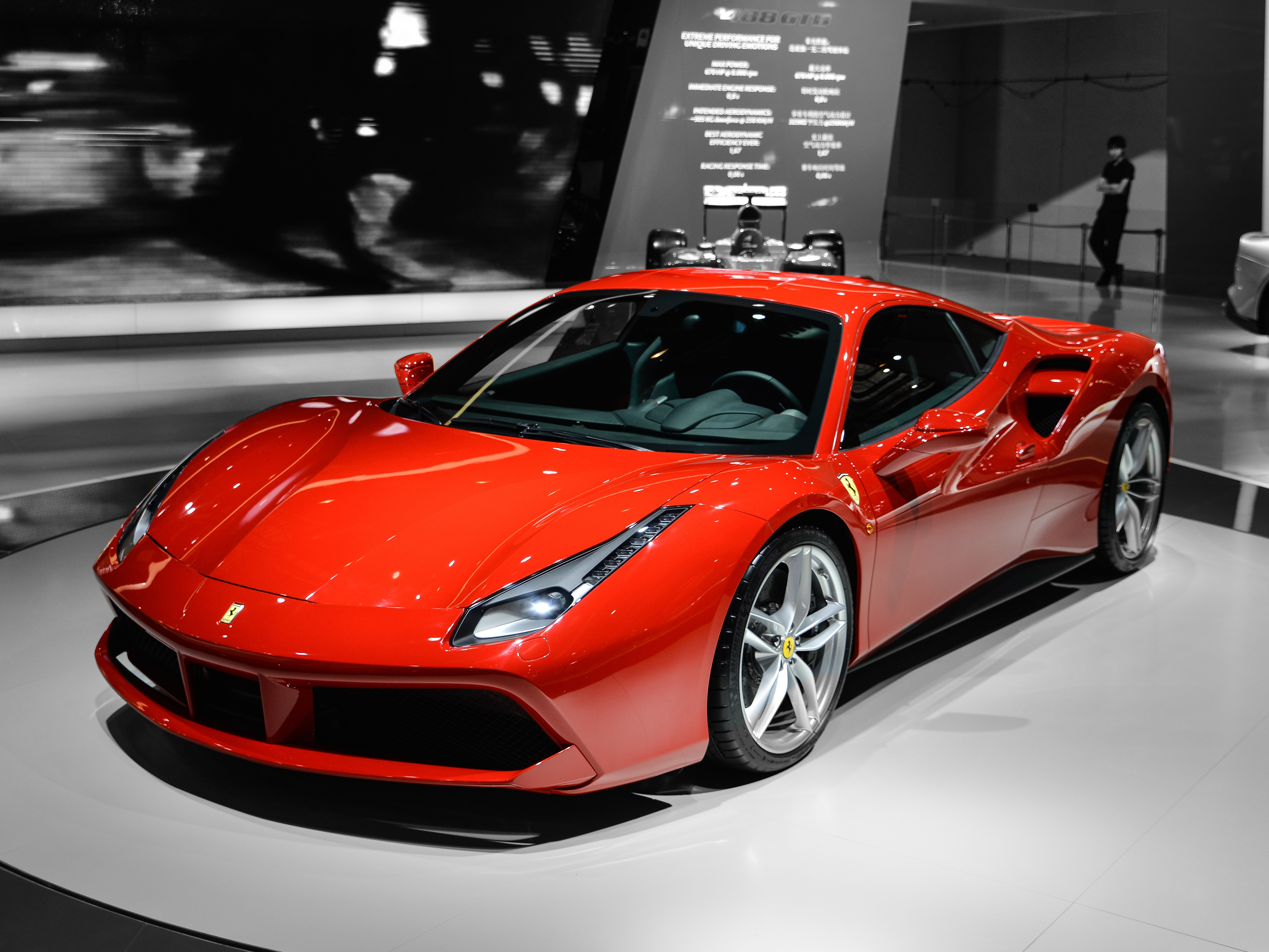
Ferrari 488

He oversees the project of the "New Ferrari Style Center" inside the Ferrari production plant in Maranello (Modena). The new building, inaugurated on 18 September 2018, is spread over four levels with natural lights and open spaces. The top floor contains a high-tech room [unclear] for the presentation of the projects. The Style Center also houses the company's Tailor Made department.

In September 2018 Manzoni presented the Ferrari SP38 Deborah at the Grand Basel Show demonstrating his great passion for design: "It's so important to show the shape of a car as it was intended, as a masterpiece or a work of art. These presentation frames are great at stimulating contemplation – normally, we're used to seeing cars in noisy and chaotic environments. But here, there's nothing but the car, its name, and its date. There are no distractions."

The University of Sassari awarded him an honorary degree in Modern Philology and Cultural Industry on 28 June 2019 and Manzoni proposes a Lectio Doctoralis entitled Ferrari Design The metalanguage of form.

For the partnership between Ferrari and Hublot, the historic luxury watchmaking fashion house, in 2019 he designed of the Hublot Classic Fusion Ferrari GT watch, inspired by the Ferrari "Gran Turismo" universe.

On 28 May 2024 the University of Florence awarded him an honorary degree in Design; the degree is awarded for contributing to the evolution and history of automotive design.

The Ferrari Purosangue model was awarded the prestigious Compasso d'Oro for its innovative design on 20 June 2024, during a ceremony in Milan. The award, which celebrates the model's design excellence and its ability to combine performance with aesthetic sophistication, was accepted by Flavio Manzoni on behalf of Ferrari, emphasizing the importance of design in the brand's evolution.

The Ferrari Styling Centre, led by Flavio Manzoni, received a prestigious award at the 2024 Turin Auto Show. The event took place on September 13 in Turin to celebrate automotive design excellence through the exhibition of 50 of the most iconic models produced by the company. The award was granted for contributions to automotive design, honoring the distinctive models created by the Ferrari team, which combine innovation, elegance, and performance in a unique blend. Among the event highlights was the Ferrari SF90 XX Spider, showcased in a static exhibition alongside other renowned models such as the Purosangue, the 296 GTB, and the historic 308 GTB. Flavio Manzoni also participated in the celebratory parade, dedicated to the most exclusive prototypes by renowned Italian coachbuilders, driving the Ferrari Roma Spider.

== Designs ==
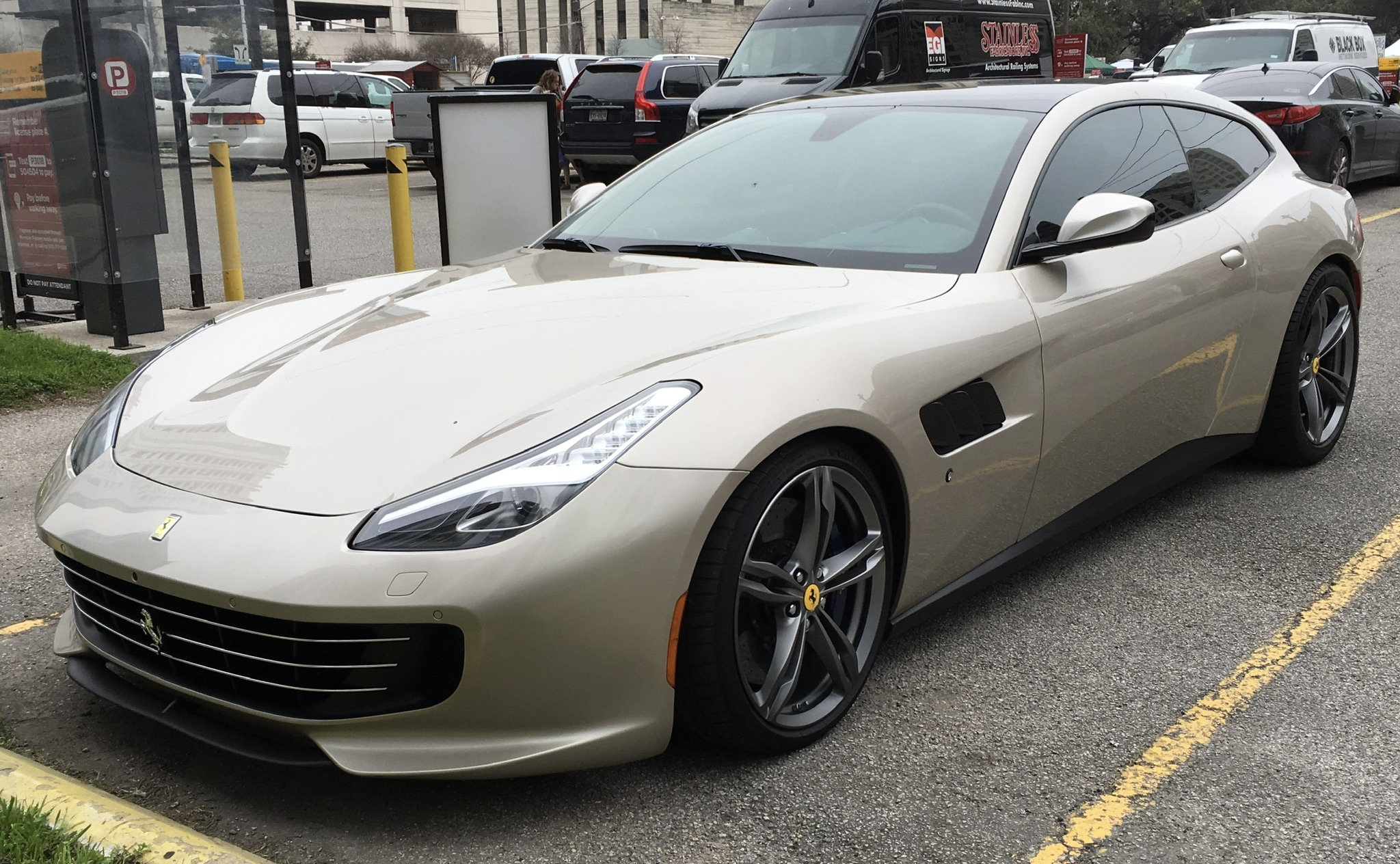
Ferrari GTC4Lusso

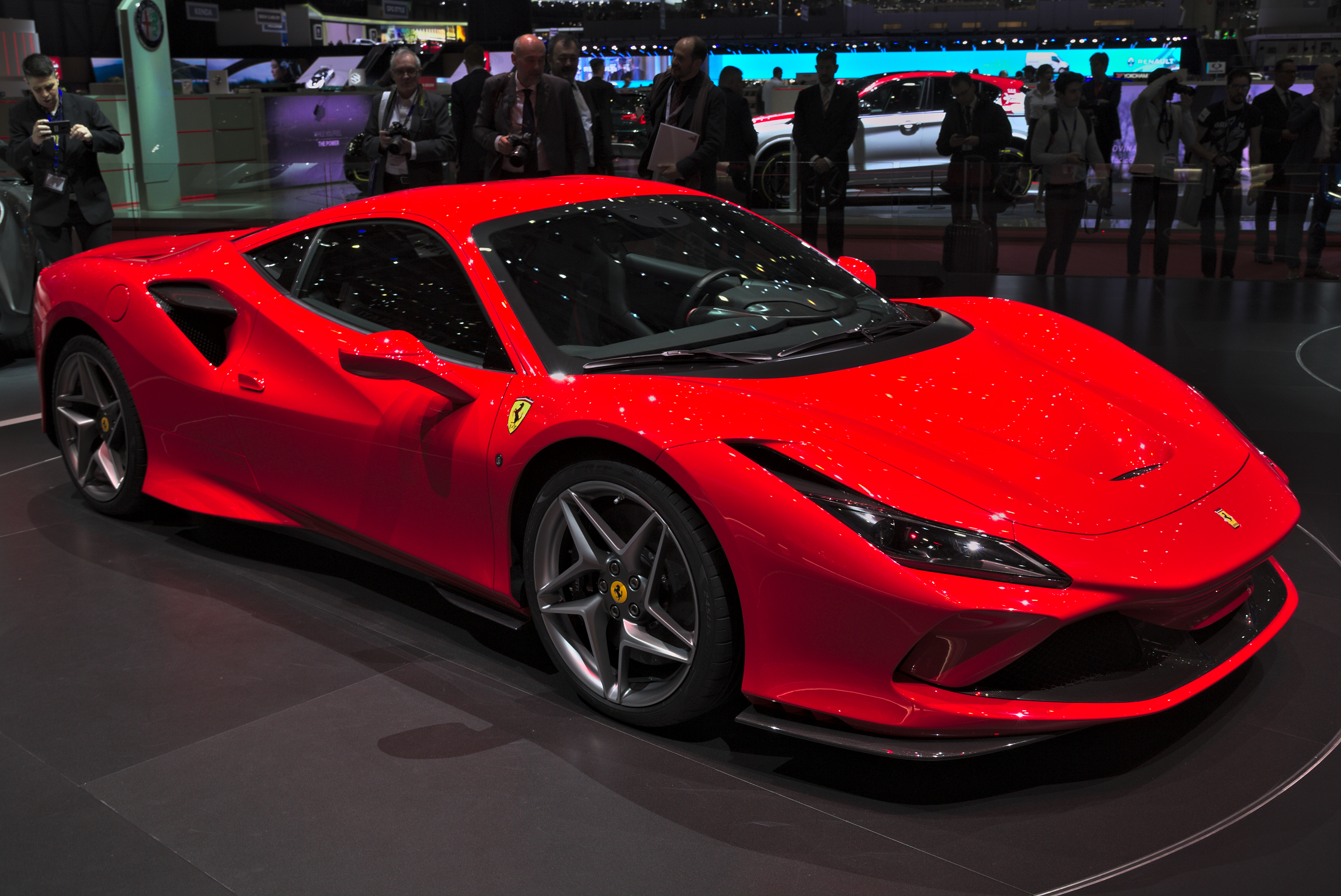
Ferrari F8 Tributo

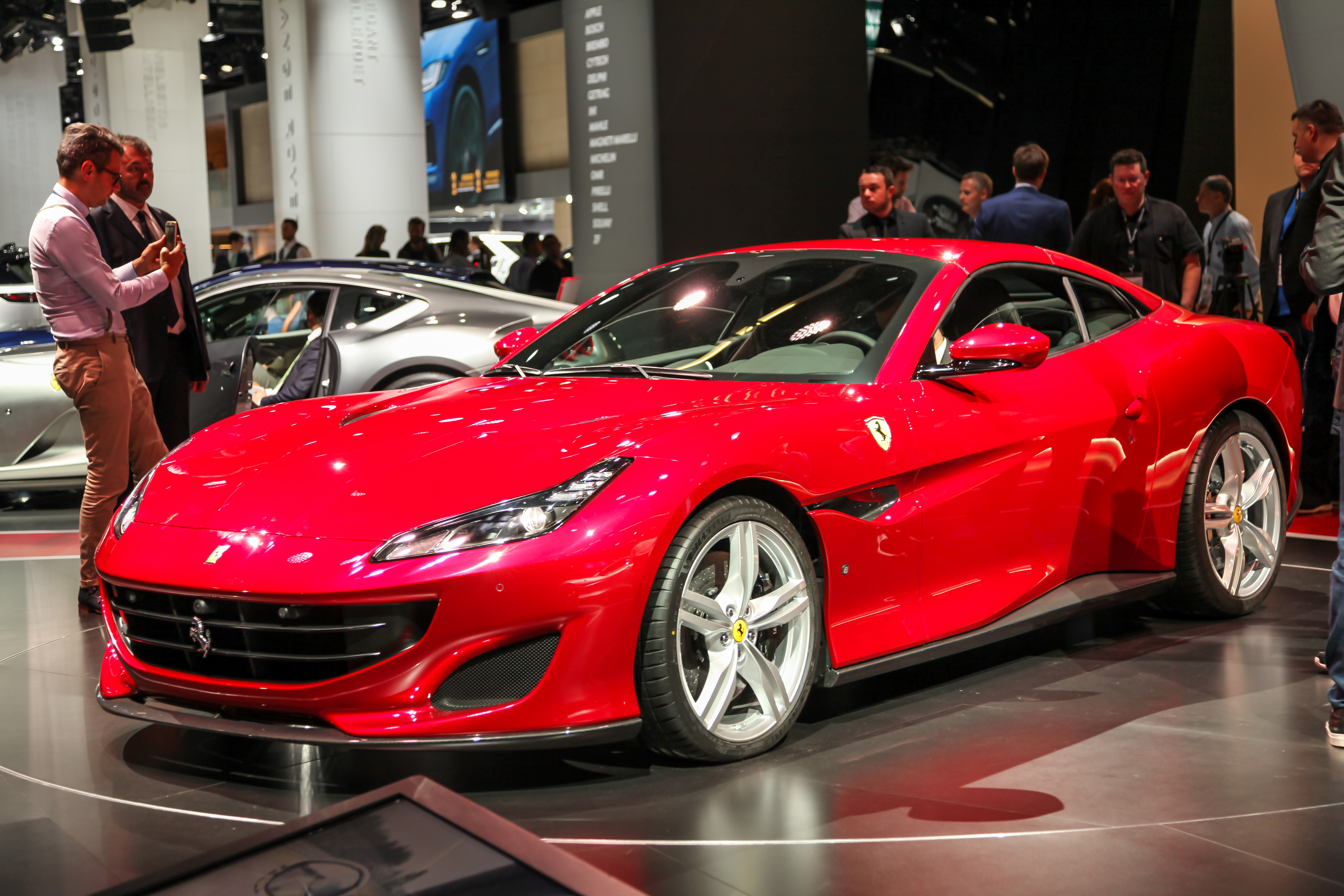
Ferrari Portofino

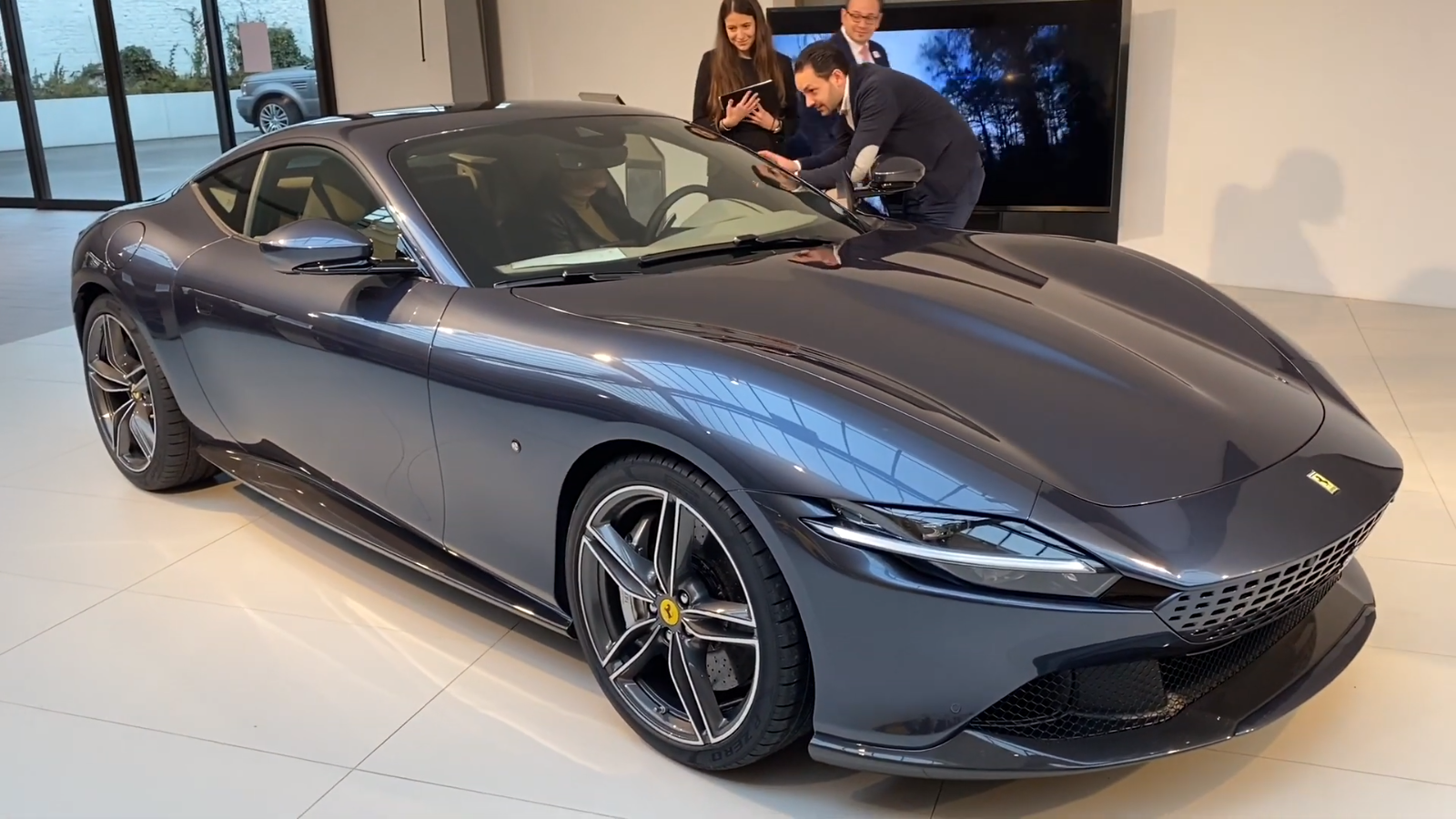
Ferrari Roma

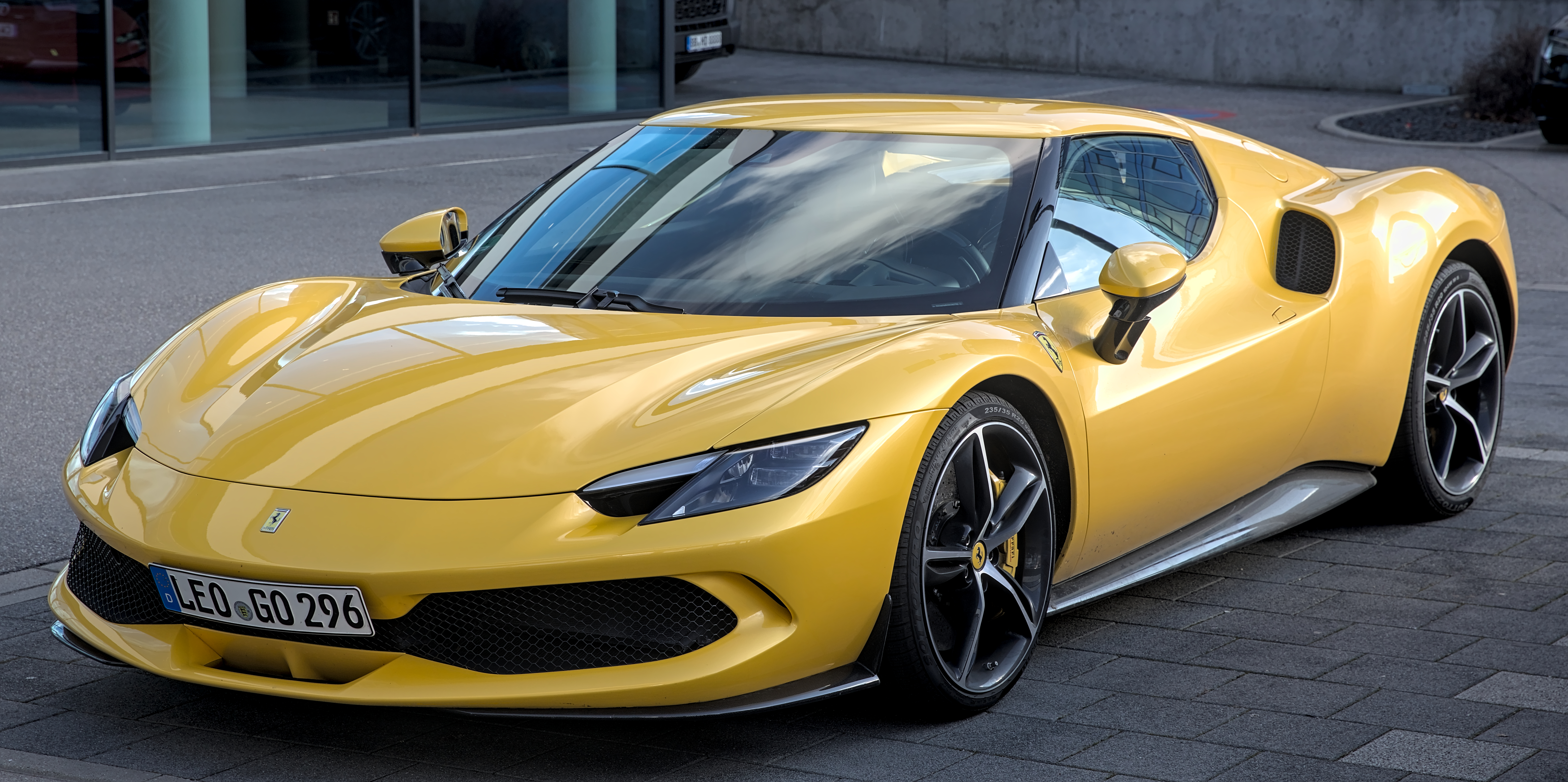
Ferrari 296 GTB

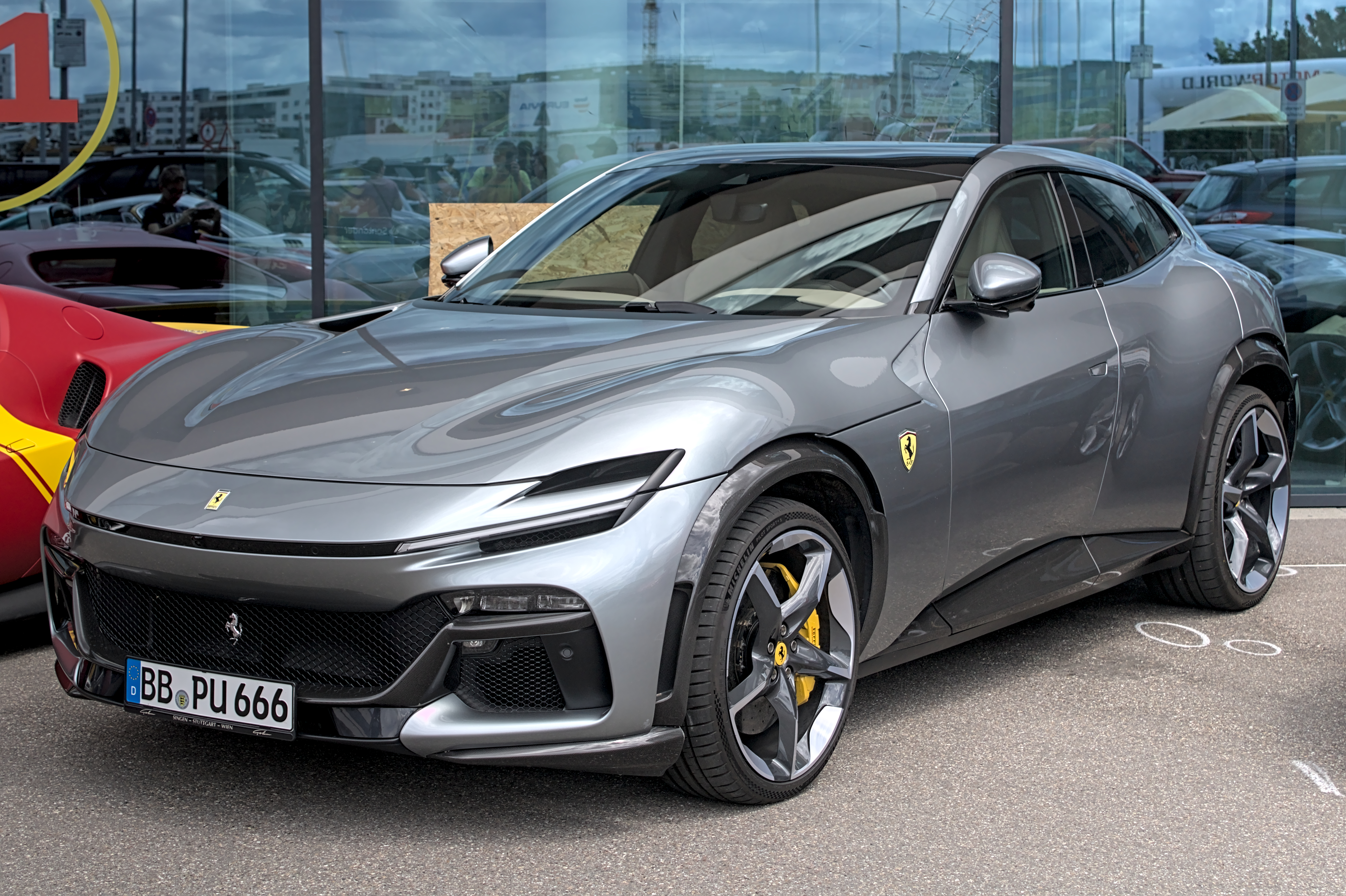
Ferrari Purosangue

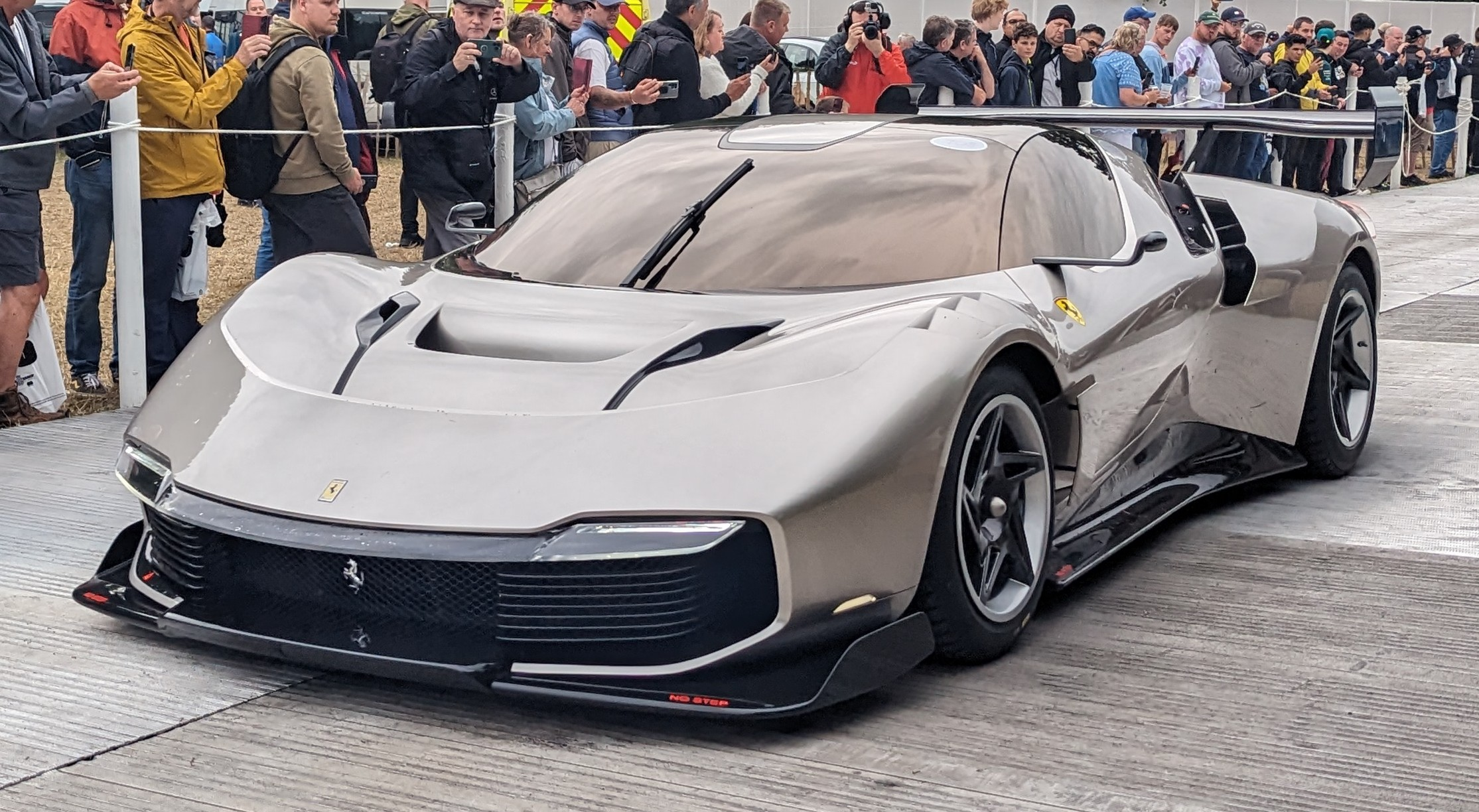
Ferrari KC23

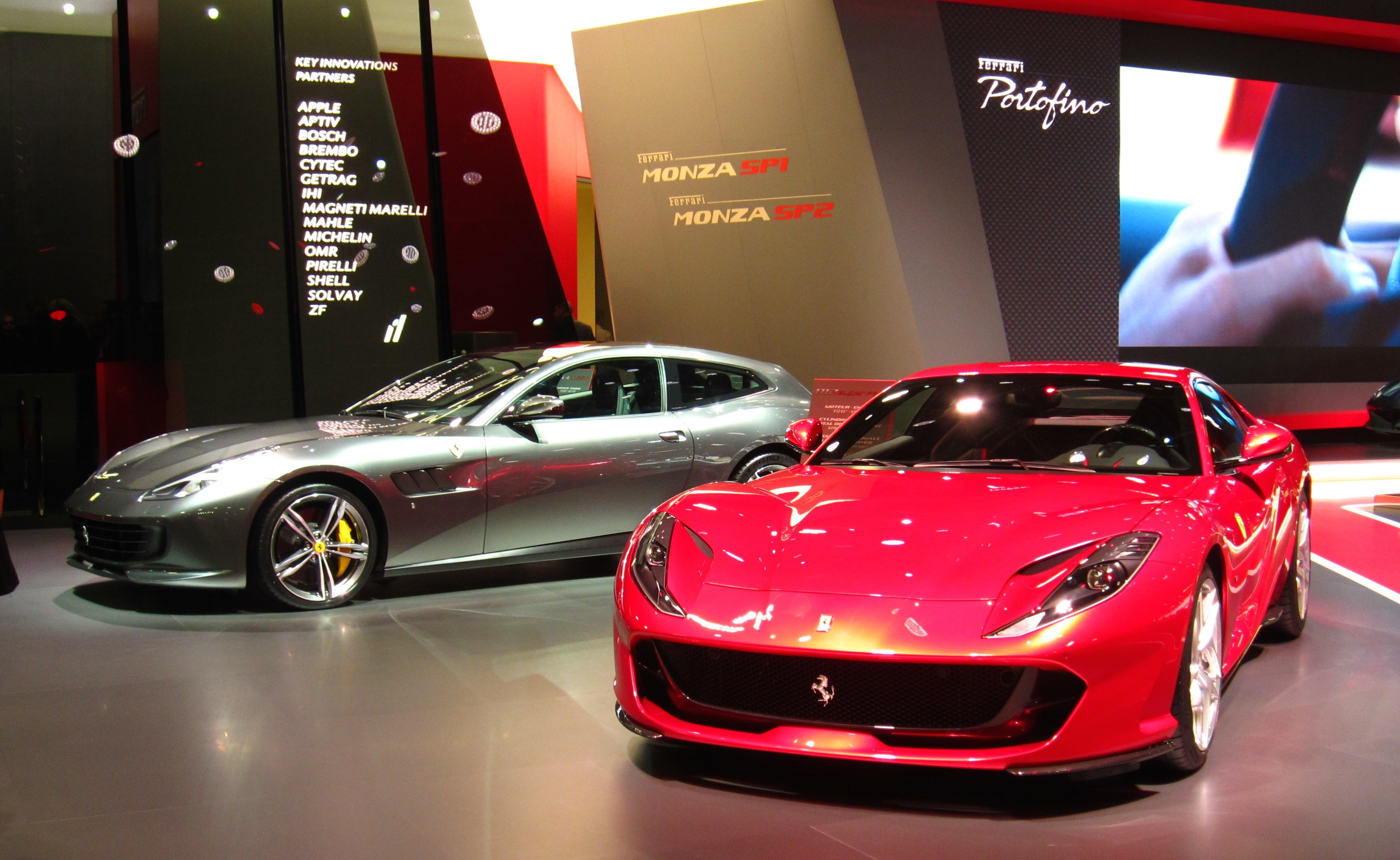
Ferrari 812 GTS

- Lancia Dialogos (interiors) (1998)
- Lancia Lybra (interiors) (1998)
- Lancia Thesis (interiors) (2001)
- Seat Tango (2001)
- Lancia Granturismo Stilnovo concept (2003)
- Lancia Fulvia Coupé concept (2003)
- Lancia Ypsilon (2003)
- Lancia Musa (2004)
- Volkswagen Scirocco III (2008)
- Volkswagen Golf VI (2008)
- Volkswagen BlueSport Concept (2009)
- Ferrari SA Aperta (2010)
- Ferrari FF (2011)
- Ferrari Superamerica 45 (2011)
- Ferrari F12 Berlinetta (2012)
- Ferrari GT Aperta (2012)
- Ferrari SP12 EC (2012)
- Ferrari SP30 (2012)
- Ferrari LaFerrari (2013)
- Ferrari 458 Speciale (2013)
- Ferrari FXX (2013)
- Ferrari California T (2014)
- Ferrari SP America (2014)
- Ferrari F12 TRS (2014)
- Ferrari 458 Speciale A (2014)
- Ferrari F60 America (2014)
- Ferrari FXX-K (2014)
- Ferrari 488 GTB (2015)
- Ferrari 488 Spider (2015)
- Ferrari F12tdf (2015)
- Ferrari GTC4 Lusso (2016)
- Ferrari GTC4 Lusso T (2016)
- Ferrari 458 MM Speciale (2016)
- Ferrari LaFerrari Aperta (2016)
- Ferrari 488 Challenge (2016)
- Ferrari SP275 RW Competizione (2016)
- Ferrari J50 (2016)
- Ferrari 812 Superfast (2017)
- Ferrari FXX-K EVO (2017)
- Ferrari Portofino (2017)
- Ferrari 488 Pista (2018)
- Ferrari GScinquanta (2018)
- Ferrari SP38 (2018)
- Ferrari 488 Pista Spider (2018)
- Ferrari Monza SP1 (2018)
- Ferrari Monza SP2 (2018)
- Ferrari SP3JC (2018)
- Ferrari P80/C (2019)
- Ferrari F8 Tributo (2019)
- Ferrari SF90 Stradale (2019)
- Ferrari F8 Spider (2019)
- Ferrari 812 GTS (2019)
- Ferrari 488 Challenge EVO (2019)
- Ferrari Roma (2019)
- Ferrari Portofino M (2020)
- Ferrari Omologata (2020)
- Ferrari SF90 Spider (2020)
- Ferrari 812 Competizione (2021)
- Ferrari 812 Competizione A (2021)
- Ferrari 296 GTB (2021)
- Ferrari Daytona SP3 (2021)
- Ferrari BR20 (2021)
- Ferrari 296 GTS (2022)
- Ferrari SP48 Unica (2022)
- Ferrari Purosangue (2022)
- Ferrari SP51 (2022)
- Ferrari 499P (2022)
- Ferrari Vision Gran Turismo (2022)
- Ferrari SF90 XX Stradale (2023)
- Ferrari SF90 XX Spider (2023)
- Ferrari KC23 (2023)
- Ferrari 12Cilindri (2024)
- Ferrari F80 (2025)
- Ferrari F76 (2025)
- Ferrari Amalfi (2026)
- Ferrari 849 Testarossa (2026)
- Ferrari SC40 (2026)
- Ferrari HC25 (2026)
- Ferrari CZ26 (2026)

=== FBX – Ferrari Brand Extension ===
- Poltrona Cockpit (2017)
- Ferrari/Hublot Techframe (Basilea – 2017)
- Ferrari/Hublot Classic Fusion GT (Basilea – 2019)
- RM UP-01 Ferrari/Richard Mille (2022)
- HP Limited Edition Scuderia Ferrari PC (2026)

=== Building ===
- Nuovo Centro Stile (Maranello – 2018)

== Awards ==
The Ferrari Design team headed by Flavio Manzoni has received numerous international awards and recognitions for its car models:

2012

- Auto Bild Design Award – F12berlinetta – Hamburg

2013

- Design Award Autoscout24 – LaFerrari – München
- Mamuthone ad Honorem – Cagliari

2014

- Compasso d’Oro ADI – Ferrari F12berlinetta – Milan
- Auto Design Award – LaFerrari – Geneva
- Born Ultimate Design for Ferrari Cars – Courchevel

2015

- Red Dot Best of The Best – Ferrari FXX-K – Essen
- Red Dot – Ferrari LaFerrari – Essen
- Red Dot – Ferrari California T – Essen

2016

- Compasso d’Oro ADI – Ferrari FXX-K – Milan
- iF Gold Design Award – Ferrari FXX-K – München
- iF Design Award – Ferrari 488 GTB – Munchen
- iF Design Award – Ferrari 488 Spider – München
- Red Dot Best of The Best – Ferrari 488 GTB – Essen
- Autonis Design Award – Ferrari 488 Spider – Stuttgart
- Good Design Award Chicago Athenaeum – Ferrari F12tdf – Chicago
- Good Design Award Chicago Athenaeum – Ferrari 488 Spider – Chicago

2017

- Most Beautiful Supercar of the Year – International Automobile Festival – Ferrari GTC4Lusso – Paris
- Good Design Award Chicago Athenaeum – Ferrari GTC4Lusso – Chicago
- Good Design Award Chicago Athenaeum – Ferrari J50 – Chicago
- Good Design Award Chicago Athenaeum – Ferrari 812 Superfast – Chicago
- iF Gold Design Award – Ferrari GTC4Lusso – München
- iF Design Award – Ferrari 458 MM Speciale – München
- Red Dot – LaFerrari Aperta – Essen
- Red Dot – Ferrari GTC4Lusso – Essen
- Red Dot – 458MM Speciale – Essen
- Red Dot Best of The Best – Ferrari J50- Essen

2018

- iF Design Award – LaFerrari Aperta – München
- iF Gold Design Award – Ferrari J50 – München
- Red Dot Design Award - Ferrari FXX-K Evo – Essen
- Red Dot Design Award – Ferrari 812 Superfast – Essen
- Red Dot Best of The Best – Ferrari Portofino – Essen
- Design Award for Concept Cars & Prototypes Concorso d’Eleganza Villa d’Este – Ferrari SP38 – Cernobbio
- Auto Europa 2019 Uiga – Ferrari Portofino – Roma
- Menzione d’onore Compasso d’oro ADI – Ferrari J50

2019

- Most Beautiful Supercar of the Year – Ferrari Monza SP2 – Paris
- iF Design Award – Ferrari 488 Pista – München
- iF Design Award – Ferrari SP38 – München
- iF Design Award – Ferrari Portofino – München
- iF Gold Design Award – Ferrari Monza SP1 – München
- Red Dot Design Team of the Year 2019 – Flavio Manzoni and the Ferrari Design Team – Essen
- Red Dot Best of The Best – Ferrari Monza SP1 – Essen
- Red Dot Design Award– Ferrari 488 Pista – Essen
- Red Dot Design Award – Ferrari SP38 – Essen
- Award "Design" Orologio dell'Anno– Classic Fusion Ferrari GT – Milan
- Good Design Award Chicago Athenaeum – Ferrari Monza SP1 – Chicago
- Good Design Award Chicago Athenaeum – Ferrari SF90 Stradale – Chicago
- American Prize for Design – Chicago Athenaeum and The European Centre for Architecture Art Design and Urban Studies

2020

- Most Beautiful Supercar of the Year – Ferrari Roma – Paris
- iF Gold Award Design Award– Ferrari SF90 Stradale – München
- iF Design Award – Ferrari F8 Tributo – München
- iF Design Award – Ferrari P80/C– München
- Red Dot Best of The Best – Ferrari SF90 Stradale – Essen
- Red Dot Design Award– Ferrari Roma – Essen
- Red Dot Design Award – Ferrari F8 Tributo – Essen
- XXVI PREMIO COMPASSO D’ORO – Ferrari Monza SP1- Milano
- Car Design Award 2020 – Ferrari Roma – Milano;
- Good Design Award Chicago Athenaeum – Ferrari Roma – Chicago

2021

- Red Dot Design Award – Ferrari SF90 Spider – Essen
- Red Dot Design Award – Ferrari Omologata– Essen
- iF Design Award – Ferrari Roma
- iF Design Award – Ferrari SF90 Spider
- AUTONIS – Best New Design 2021-Auto Motor und Sport – Ferrari Portofino M
- Most Beautiful Supercar of the Year – Ferrari Daytona SP3 – Paris
- Good Design Award Chicago Athenaeum – Ferrari 812 Competizione – Chicago
- Good Design Award Chicago Athenaeum – Ferrari 812 Competizione A – Chicago
- Good Design Award Chicago Athenaeum – Ferrari SF90 Spider – Chicago
- Good Design Award Chicago Athenaeum – Ferrari Omologata – Chicago

2022

- Red Dot Best of The Best – Ferrari Daytona SP3 – Essen
- Red Dot Design Award– Ferrari 296 GTB – Essen
- Red Dot Design Award– Ferrari Competizione – Essen
- Red Dot Design Award– Ferrari Competizione A – Essen
- iF Design Award – Ferrari 296 GTB
- iF Design Award – Ferrari Competizione
- iF Design Award – Ferrari Competizione A
- Car Design Award 2022 – Ferrari 296 GTB – Milano;
- EyesOn Design Award 2022 – Ferrari Daytona SP3;
- AUTONIS – Auto Motor und Sport – Best New Design 2022 (TBC)- Ferrari 296 GTB
- Supercar Of The Year at the TopGear Awards – Ferrari 296 GTB;
- Grand Prix du Design- Automobile Awards 2022 – Ferrari Daytona SP3;
- Good Design Award Chicago Athenaeum – Ferrari Daytona SP3;
- Good Design Award Chicago Athenaeum – Ferrari SP48 Unica;
- Good Design Award Chicago Athenaeum – Ferrari 296 GTB;
- Good Design Award Chicago Athenaeum – Ferrari 296 GTS

2023

- Car Design Award 2023 – Ferrari Purosangue – Milano;
- Car Design Award 2023 – Ferrari brand design Language – Milano;
- Red Dot Best of The Best – Ferrari Purosangue – Essen
- Red Dot Best of The Best – Ferrari Vision Gran Turismo – Essen
- Red Dot Design Award– Ferrari 296 GTS – Essen

2024

- Compasso d’Oro ADI – Ferrari Purosangue – Milan

== Design objects ==
- Madreterra – giant version of the table lamp "The Great JJ" (2014)
- Techframe Ferrari 70 Years Tourbillon Chronograph – clock Hublot (2017)
- Manifest Nuoro Jazz – 2020
- Montblanc Ferrari Stilema SP3 – 2023
