= Ferrari Monza SP =

Limited production sports car based on the Ferrari 812 Superfast

Ferrari Monza SP1 Ferrari Monza SP2
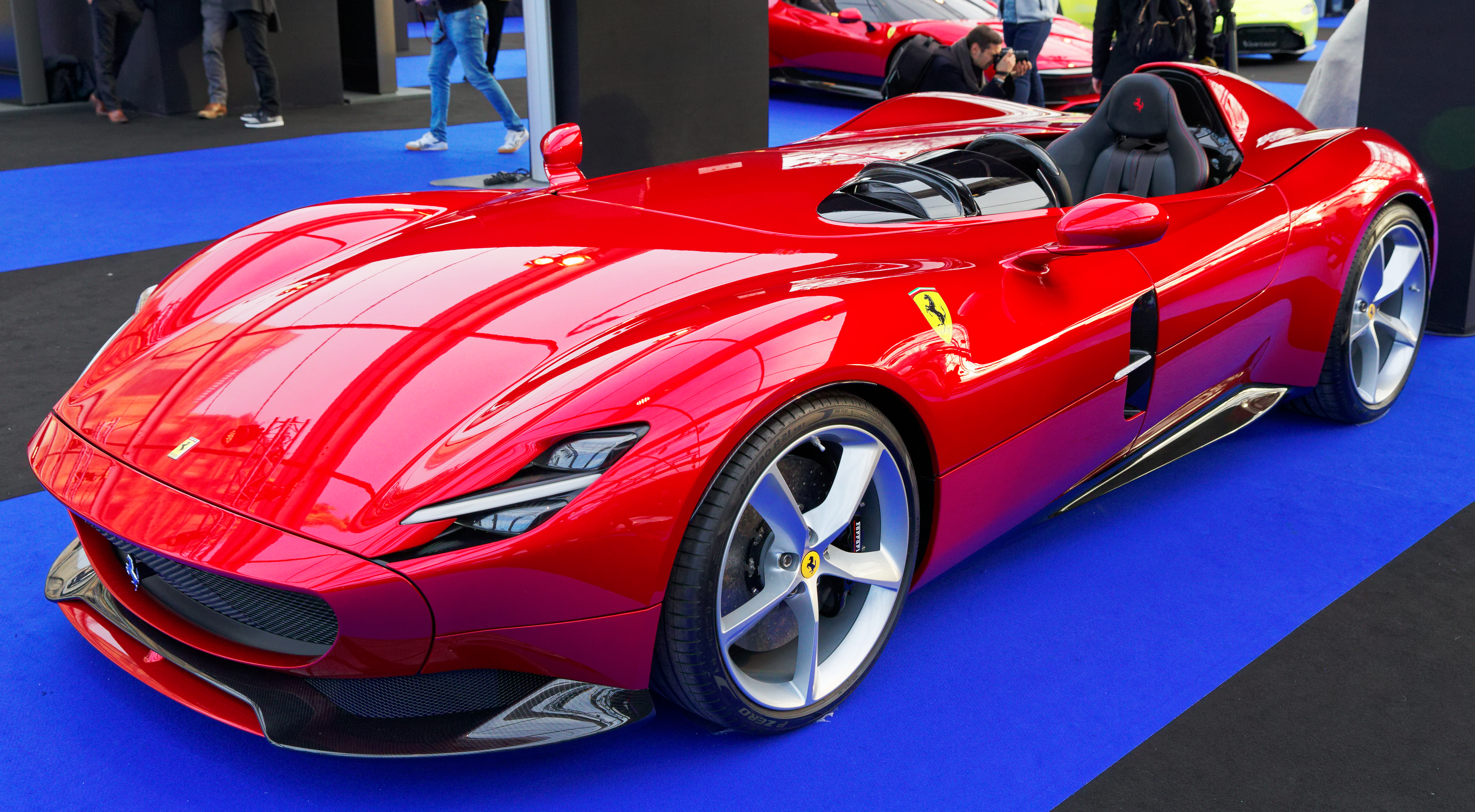
- Ferrari Monza SP1

Overview
- Manufacturer: Ferrari
- Production: 2019–2022 (499 Units)
- Model years: 2019–2023
- Assembly: Italy: Maranello
- Designer: Ferrari Styling Centre under the direction of Flavio Manzoni

Body and chassis
- Class: Sports car (S)
- Body style: 2-door speedster
- Layout: Front-engine, rear-wheel-drive
- Related: Ferrari 812 Superfast

Powertrain
- Engine: 6,496 cubic centimetres (396.4 cu in; 6.496 L) F140 GC V12
- Power output: 596 kW (799 bhp; 810 PS) at 8,500 rpm 530 lb⋅ft (719 N⋅m) at 7,000 rpm
- Transmission: 7-speed Magna 7DCL750 dual clutch

Dimensions
- Wheelbase: 2,720 mm (107 in)
- Length: 4,657 mm (183 in)
- Width: 1,996 mm (79 in)
- Height: 1,155 mm (45 in)
- Kerb weight: SP1: 1,500 kg (3,307 lb); SP2: 1,520 kg (3,351 lb)

The Ferrari Monza SP1 and SP2 are limited production sports cars produced by Italian automobile manufacturer Ferrari, introduced in 2018 for the 2019 model year. The cars mark the start of a new lineage of models called the "Icona" series, a program aimed at creating special cars inspired by classic Ferrari models, all to be produced in limited series. The first cars of the new lineage are the Monza SP1 and SP2, whose designs are inspired by the 750 Monza, 250 Testarossa and 166 MM. The SP1 and SP2 nomenclature refers to the number of seats for each model. 499 units were built at a price of €1.58 million before options.

== Specifications ==
=== Engine ===
Both the SP1 and SP2 are powered by a variant of the naturally aspirated 6,496 cc (6.5 L; 396.4 cu in) F140 GA V12 found in the 812 Superfast. The engine has been tuned to generate 7.4 kW (10 hp; 10 PS) more than the engine in the 812, for a total of 596 kW (799 hp; 810 PS) at 8,500 rpm and 719 N⋅m (530 lbf⋅ft) of torque at 7,000 rpm, making them at the time, the most powerful factory Ferrari V12 road cars ever produced until the release of the 812 Competizione and Competizione A in 2021 featuring an upgraded F140 V12 producing 820 hp (830 PS).

=== Chassis ===
The chassis is loosely based on the 812 and both the SP1 and SP2 cars feature carbon fibre composite bodywork. The SP1 weighs 1,500 kg (3,306 lb), while the two-seat SP2 is 20 kg (45 lb) heavier at 1,520 kg (3,351 lb). The strength of the composite bodywork allows for the inclusion of a large clamshell hood.

=== Performance ===
Manufacturer claimed performance figures for both of the cars include a 0–97 km/h (0–60 mph) acceleration time of 2.9 seconds, 0–200 km/h (0–124 mph) acceleration time of 7.9 seconds and a top speed that exceeds 300 km/h (186 mph).

== Design ==
The SP1 and SP2 feature low slung, carbon fibre speedster bodywork inspired by early, post-war Ferrari race cars such as the 166 MM, as well as the 250 Testarossa and 750 Monza. The SP1 is a single-seater, with the driver's position situated to one side of the car, while the SP2 has two seats separated by a center section. Both of the cars feature small scissor doors and don't have windshields, instead relying on a patented system Ferrari calls the "Virtual Windshield", which is supposed to deviate airflow away from the driver. In 2020, Ferrari Styling Centre was awarded the Compasso d’Oro industrial design award for the Monza SP1. Award was received by Flavio Manzoni and Jane Reeve. All the cars are painted at Carrozzeria Zanasi in Maranello.

== Gallery ==
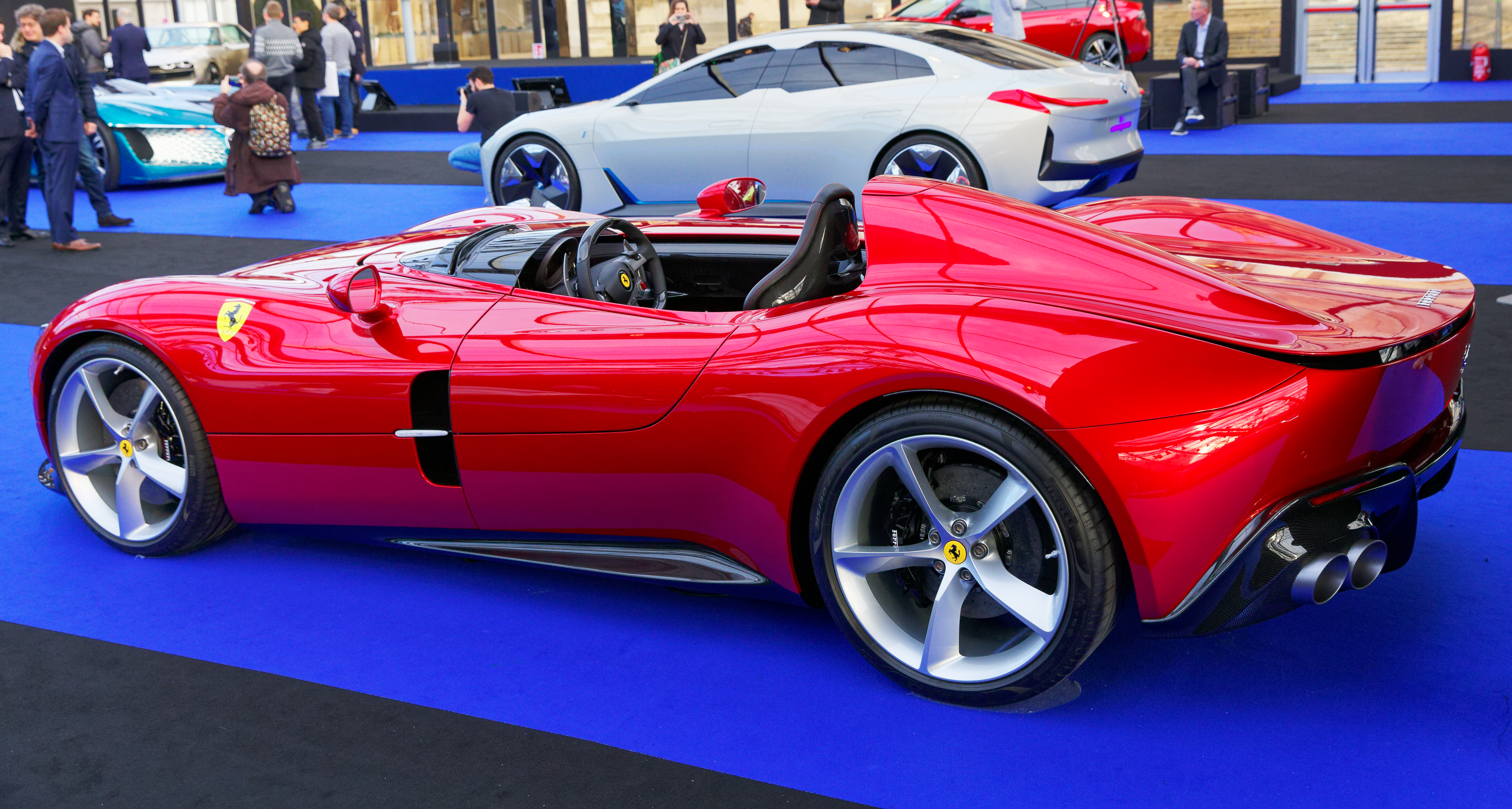
Ferrari Monza SP1

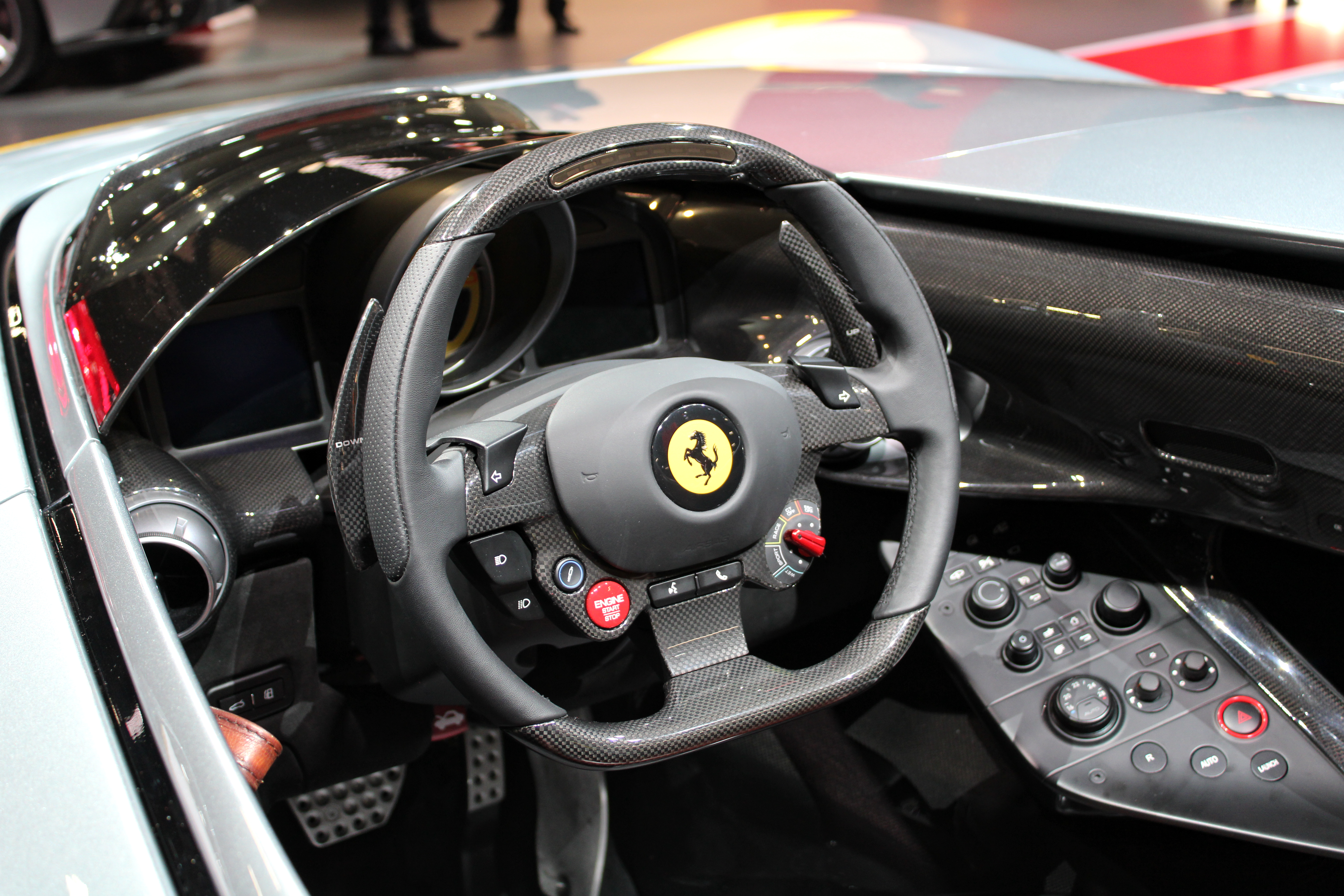
Interior (SP1)

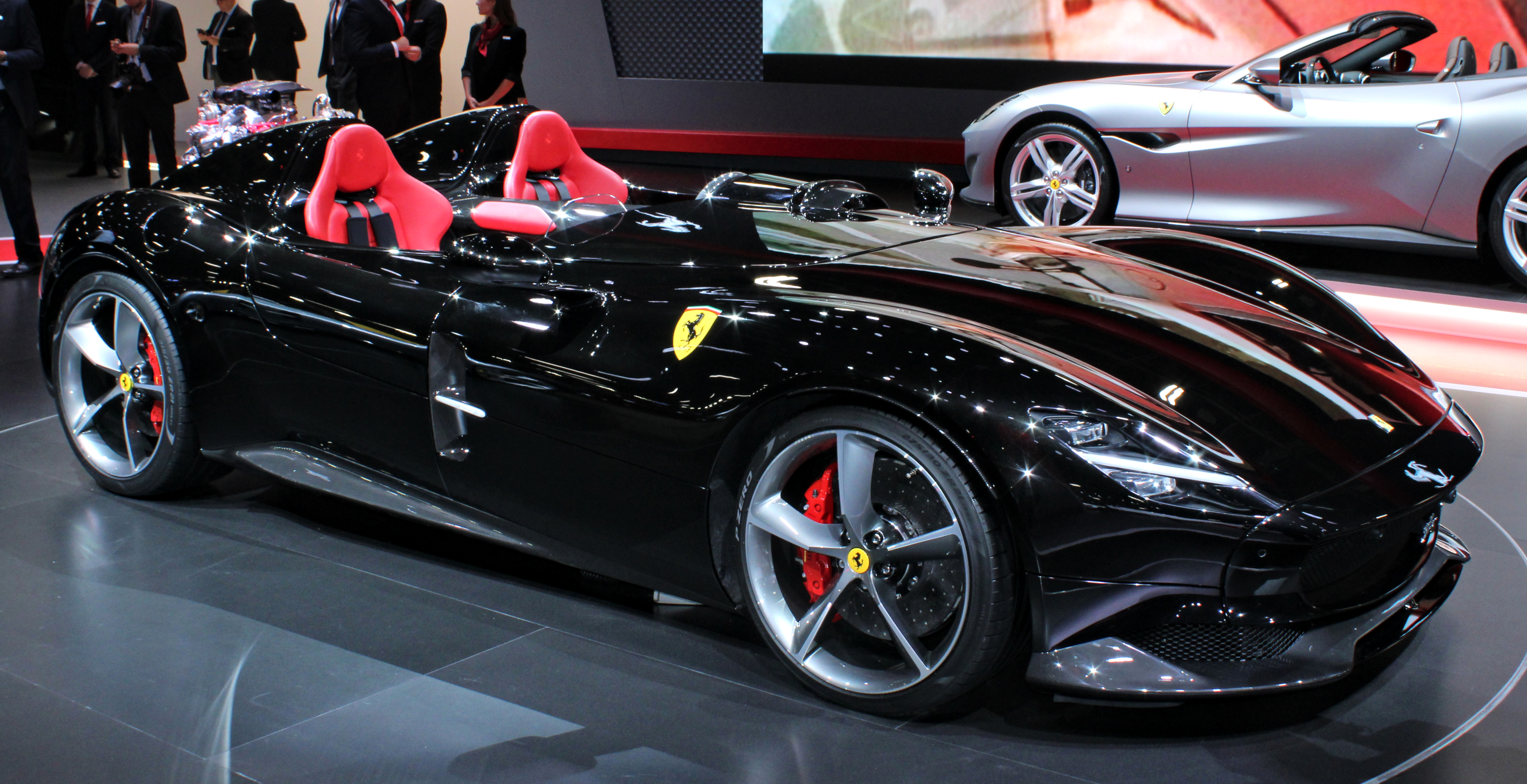
Ferrari Monza SP2

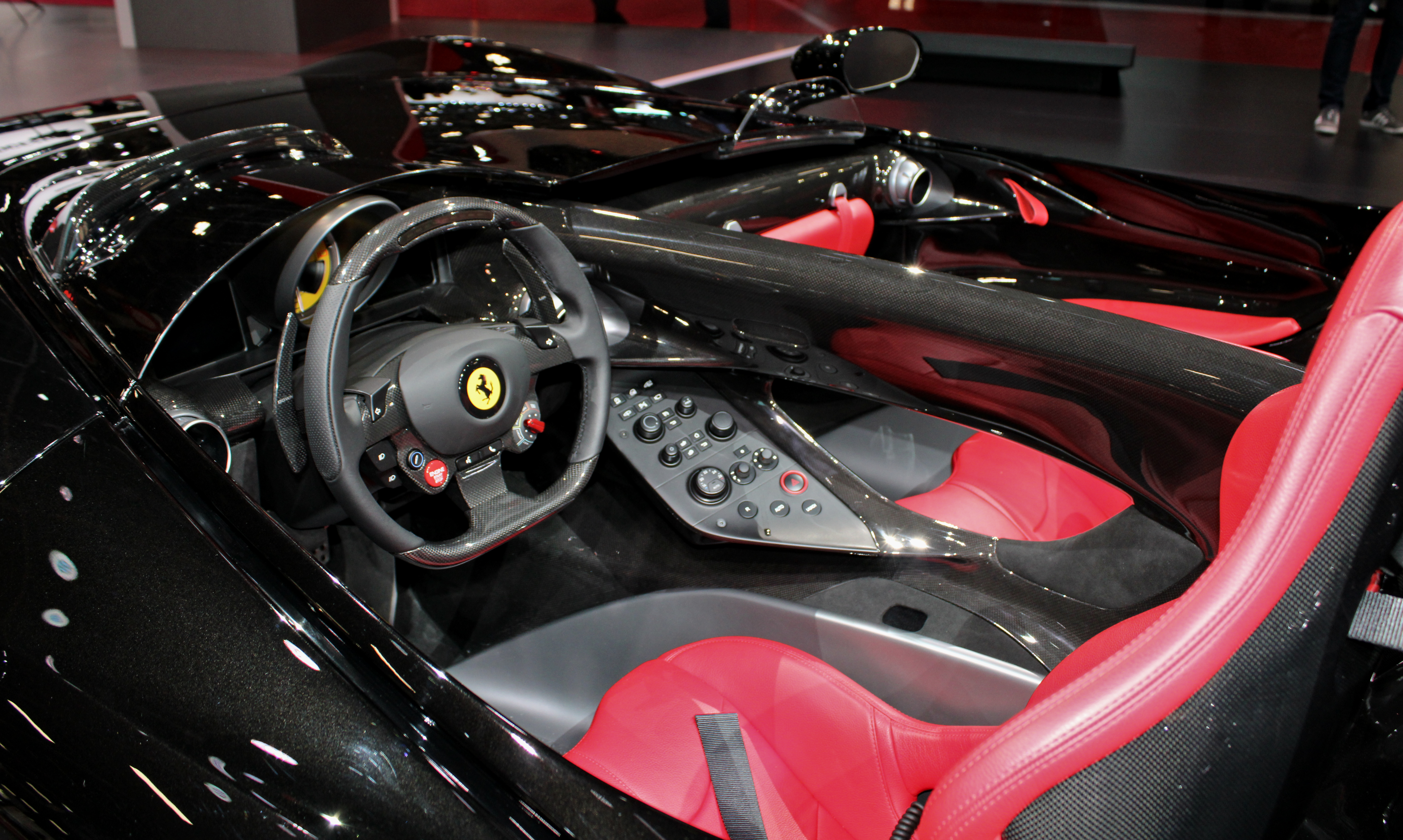
Interior (SP2)
