= Saab PhoeniX =

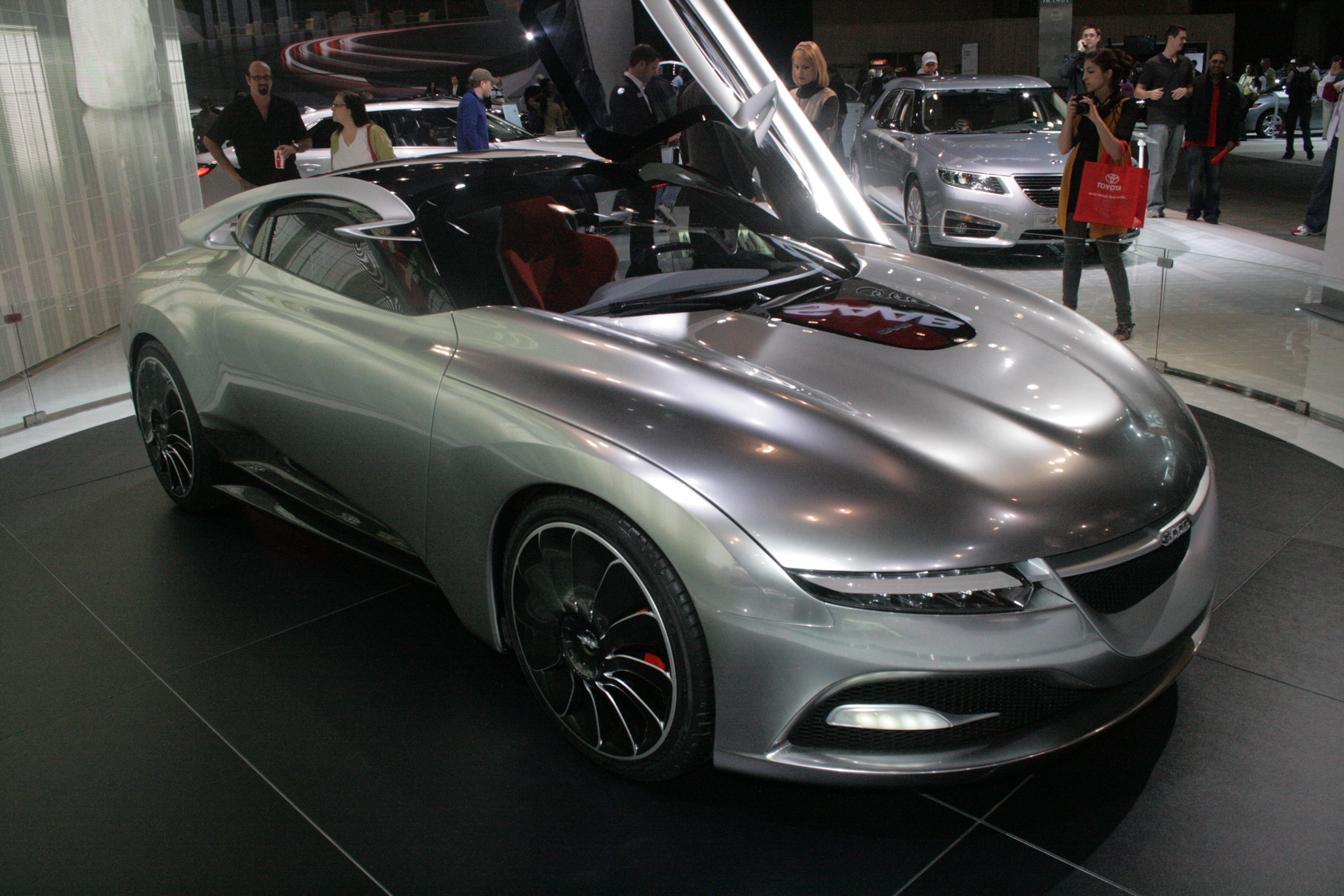

Overview
- Manufacturer: Saab Automobile
- Production: 2011 (concept car)
- Designer: Jason Castriota

Body and chassis
- Class: Grand tourer (S)
- Body style: 2-door 2+2 coupe
- Layout: Front wheel drive combustion engine with all electric rear axle giving hybrid four-wheel drive
- Doors: Butterfly

Powertrain
- Engine: 1.6 L turbocharged inline-4 BMW N18 200 hp (1.6T) and 37 hp (electric rear axle)
- Transmission: 6-speed manual

Dimensions
- Length: 4,416 mm (173.9 in)
- Width: 1,868 mm (73.5 in)
- Height: 1,328 mm (52.3 in)

The Saab PhoeniX is a concept car produced by Saab which was unveiled at the 2011 Geneva Motor Show.

The concept car's name was chosen at a time when the troubled Saab company had just been sold to Spyker by General Motors), ready to rise again, like the mythical bird the phoenix. However, at the time PhoeniX was unveiled, Saab went formally bankrupt, unable to cover their bills.

The PhoeniX was designed by Jason Castriota as one of his first creations for Saab. The design was inspired by the Saab 92001, but with design cues from nearly every Saab model made. The car uses the platform that was intended for the planned 2013 Saab 9-3 replacement, which was never realized.

The front suspension is via HiPer Strut while the rear is a linked H-arm set-up.

The car is equipped with the new hybrid all wheel drive systems that were being developed in cooperation with American Axle (AAM). The car is also fitted with IQon, an in-car information system that runs a customized version of Google Android.

The PhoeniX was awarded the 2011 Auto Express design award with a landslide victory receiving 30% of the votes, beating the Alfa Romeo 4C (2nd) and Jaguar C-X75 (3rd).

The rights to the PhoeniX platform are 100% owned by Saab, but it uses some parts (less than 10%) that are bought from GM.

== Gallery ==
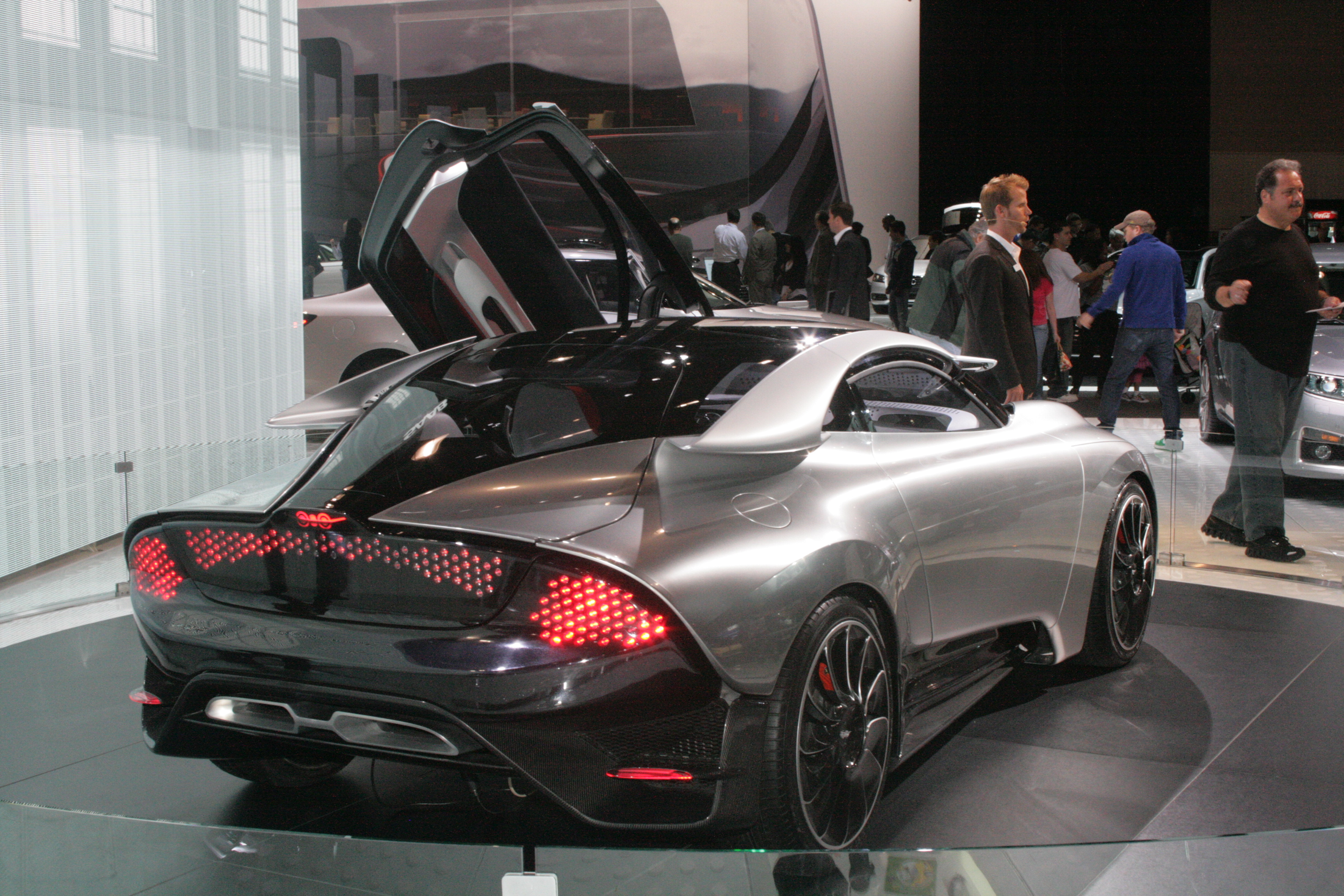
Rear view

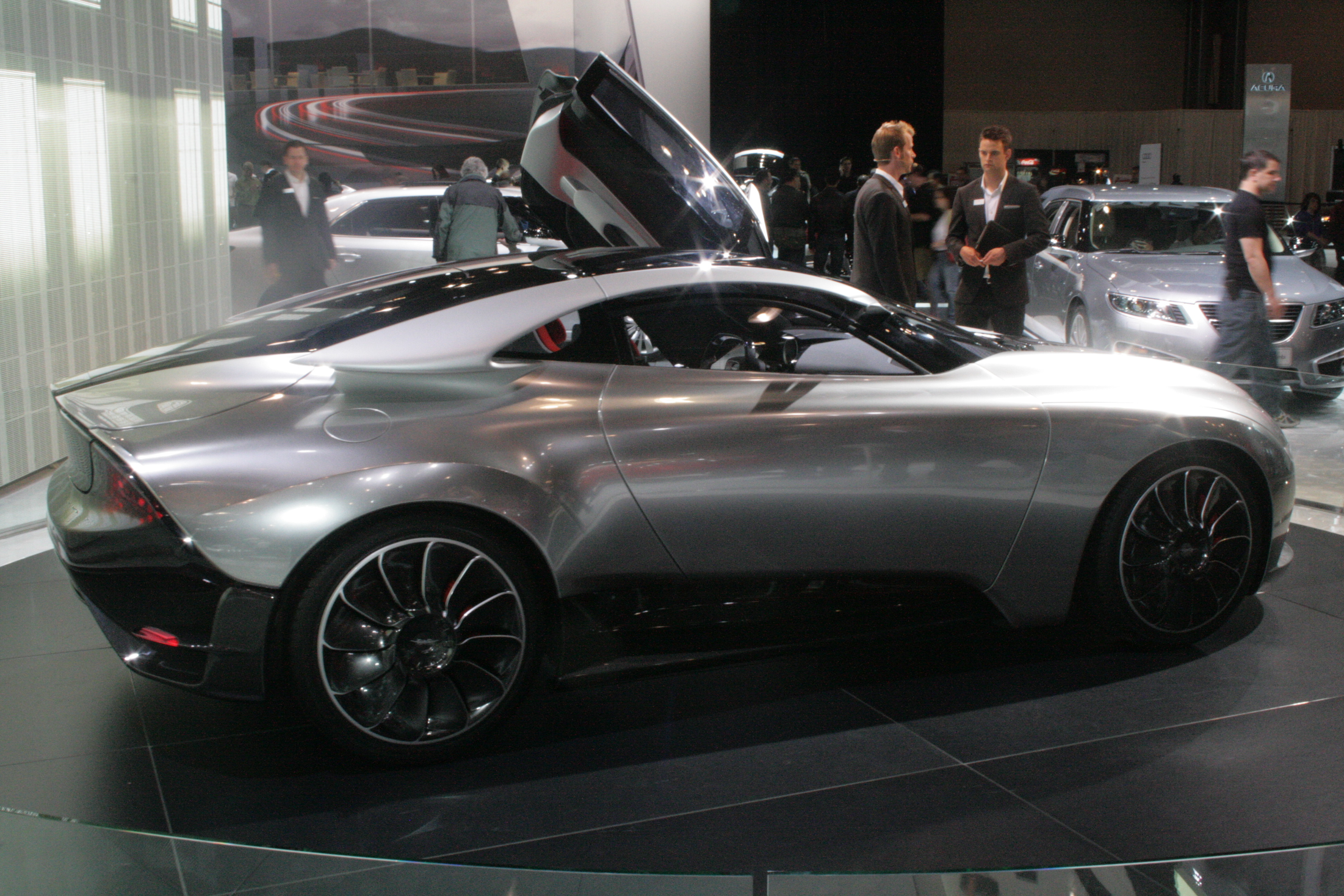

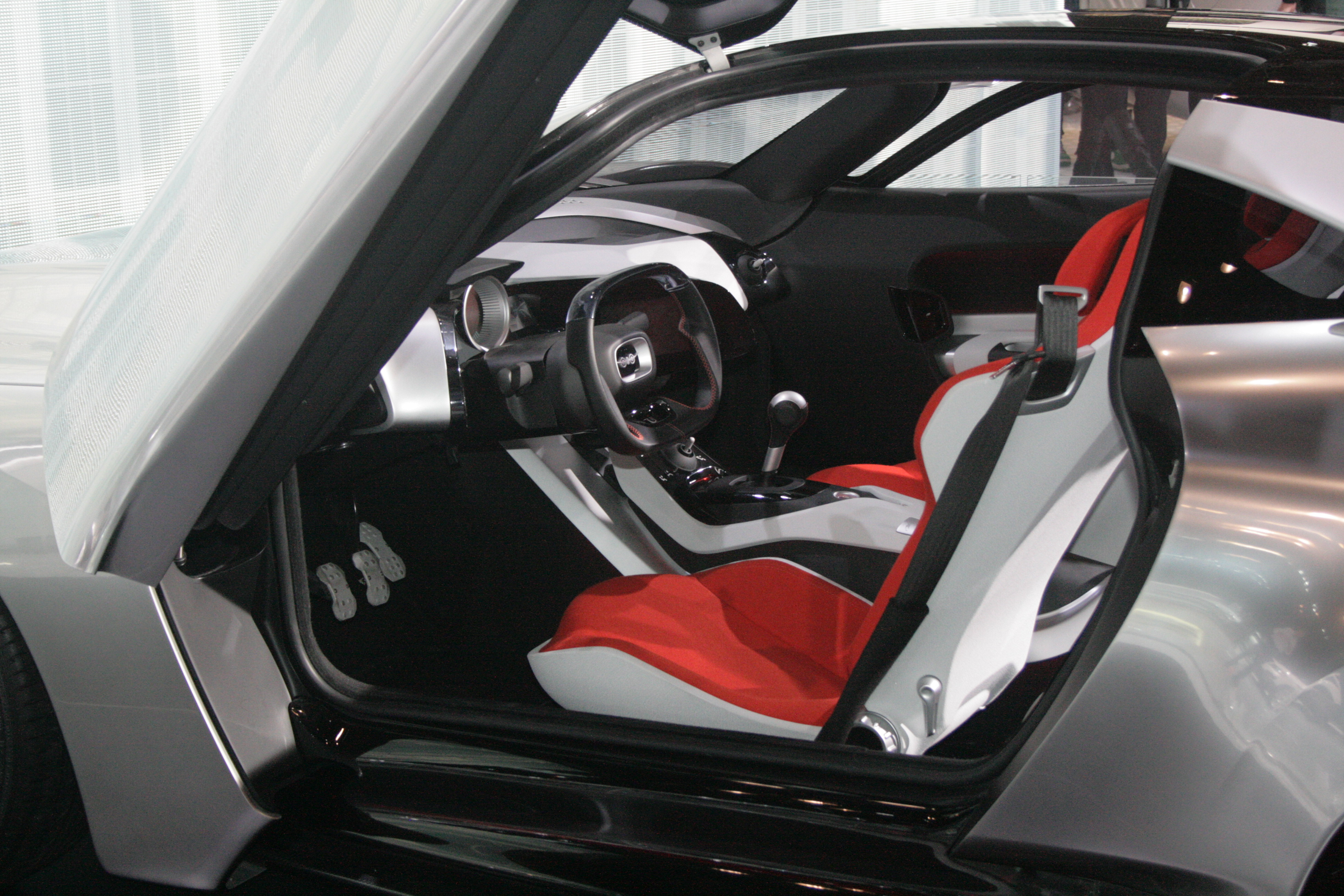
Interior
