= Bertone Mantide =

Concept car designed by Bertone

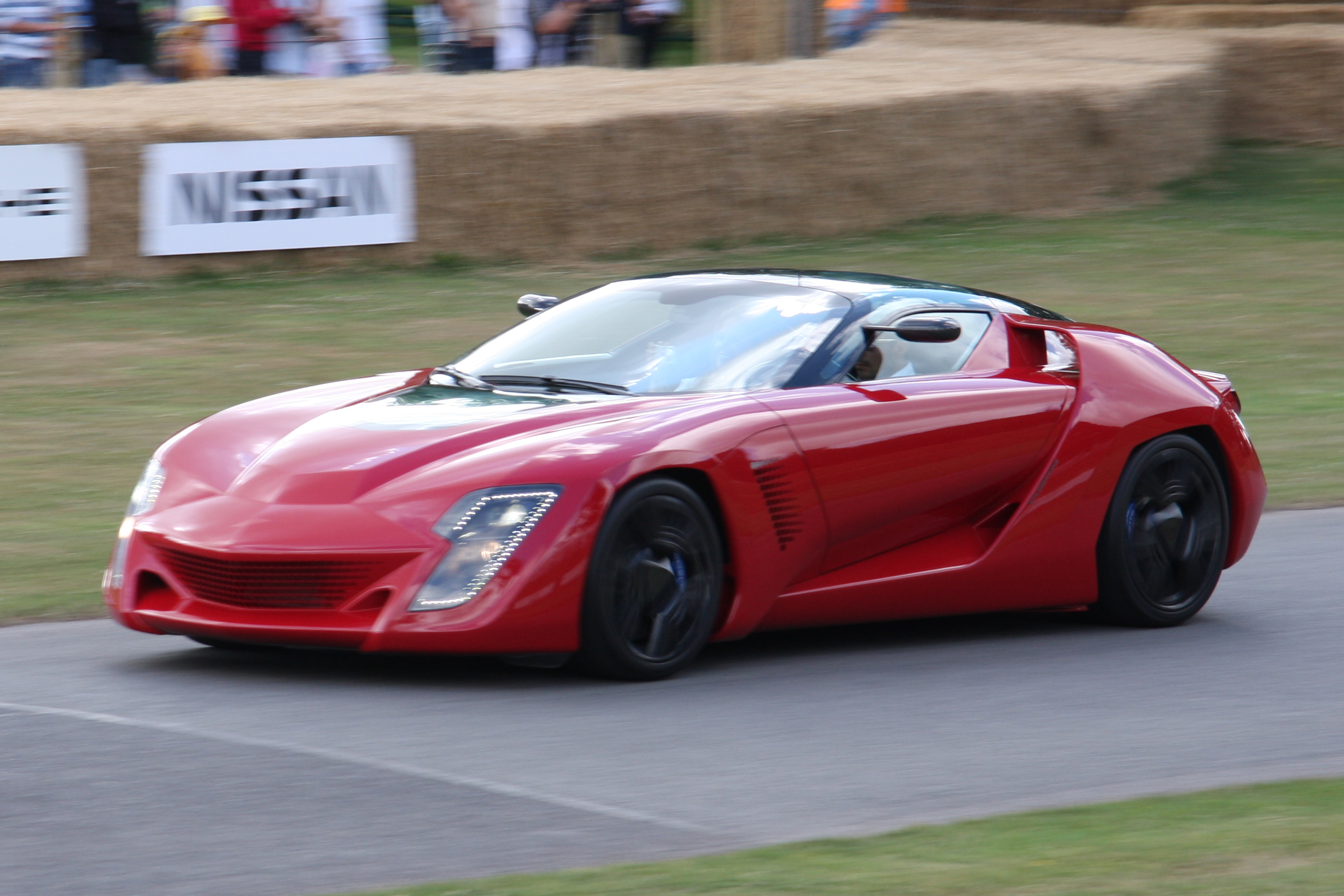

Overview
- Manufacturer: Bertone, Chevrolet
- Production: 2009 (concept car)
- Designer: Jason Castriota at Bertone

Body and chassis
- Class: Sports car (S)
- Body style: 2-door coupe
- Layout: Front mid-engine, rear-wheel-drive
- Platform: Chevrolet Y-body
- Doors: Butterfly
- Related: Corvette ZR1

Powertrain
- Engine: 6,162 cc (376.0 cu in) LS9 V8
- Transmission: 6-speed manual

Dimensions
- Curb weight: 1,420 kg (3,131 lb)

The Bertone Mantide is a concept car based on the Corvette ZR1 first unveiled in 2009 over a series of YouTube videos known simply as Project M.

The Mantide has better performance figures than the ZR1, due in part to its highly advanced aerodynamics and significant weight savings.

The overall vehicle weight has been reduced with using carbon fibre for all body panels, interior trim, seats and even the wheels. The Mantide is 220 lb (100 kg) lighter than the ZR1.

The Mantide has a 638 bhp (476 kW; 647 PS) supercharged 6,162 cc (376.0 cu in) V8 engine that produces 604 lb⋅ft (819 N⋅m) of torque at 3800 rpm. The new body has aerodynamic benefits over the ZR1, with drag reduced by 25% (Cd 0.298) and a 30% improvement over the ZR1 in down force. It can accelerate from 0-62 mph (0–100 km/h) in 3.3 seconds and has a top speed of 351 km/h (218 mph). Although it was widely reported that Bertone planned to produce 10 Mantides, the car was specially made for car collector Dan Watkins and only one was ever made.

In October 2019, it was put up for sale in the Autosport Designs in Long Island. The car is already repainted "Bianco Fuji" and has a mileage of 10,000 miles.

== Games ==
The Mantide appears in Forza Motorsport 3 & Forza Motorsport 4. It is available as a free unlock at driver level 35, along with a small collection of similar valued cars. In-game, the Mantide is valued at 1,000,000 Credits.

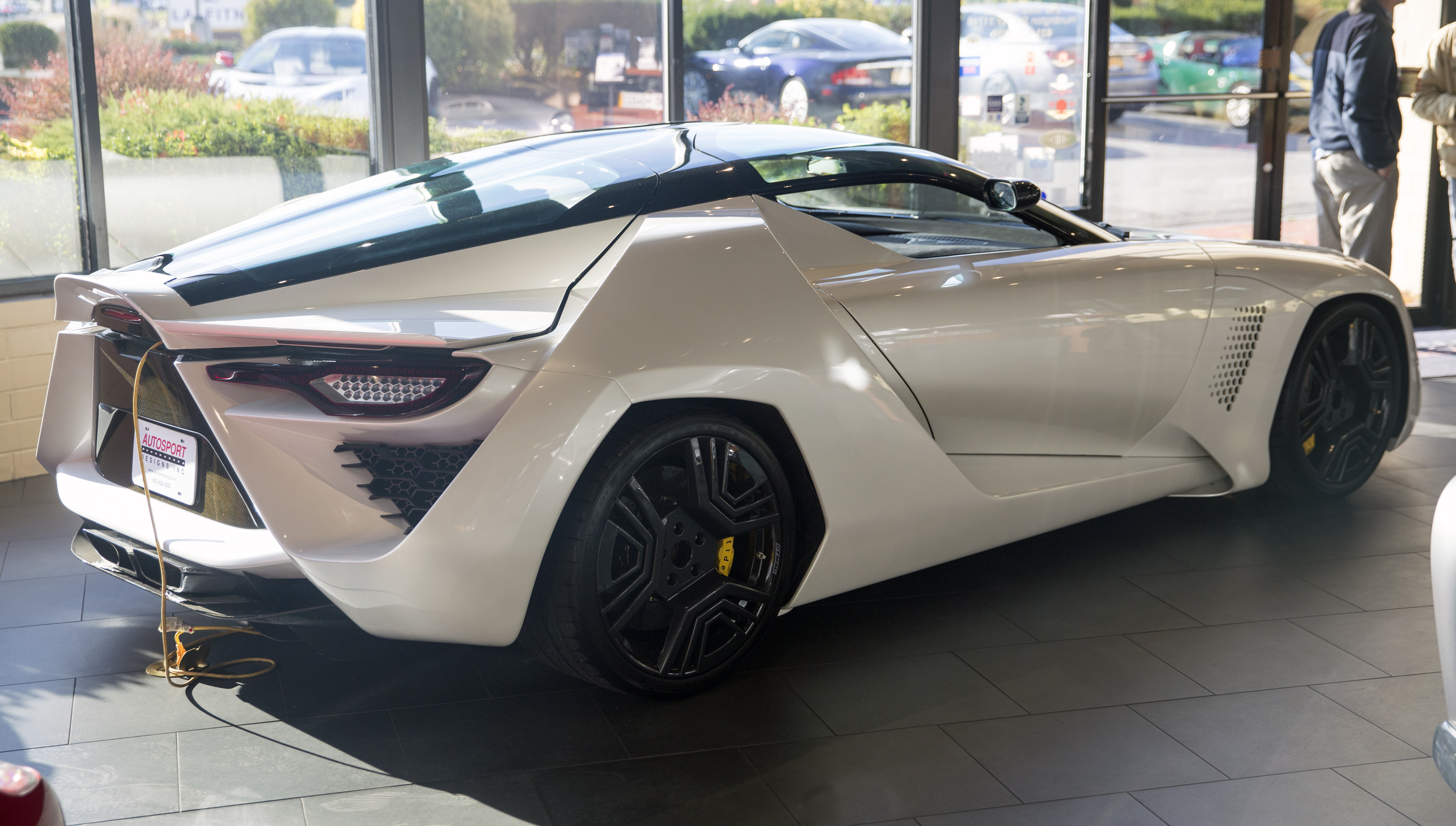
In "Bianco Fuji" (rear view)
