= Ferrari 599 =

Grand Tourer produced by Ferrari from 2006 to 2012 as a successor to the 575M

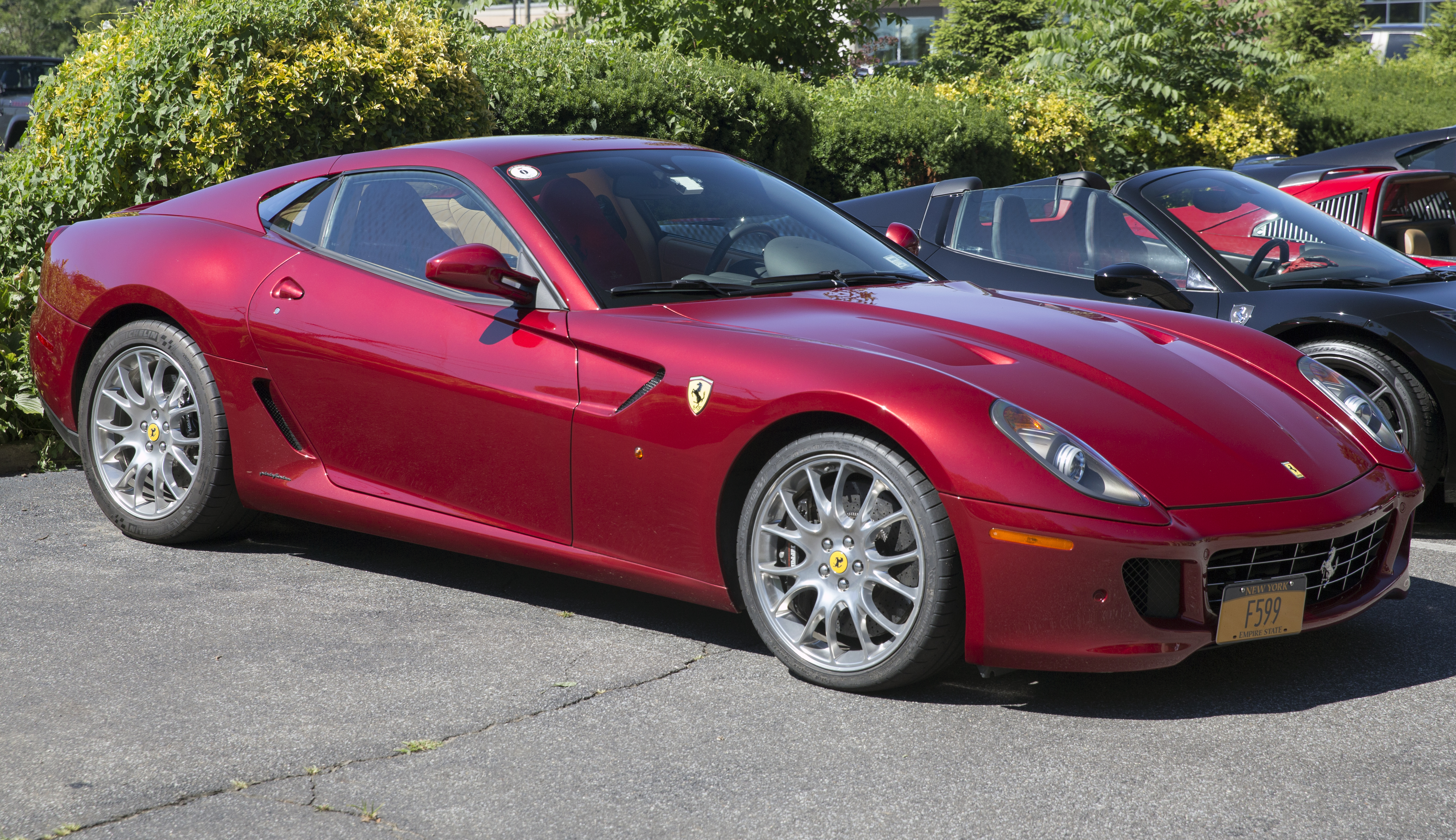

Overview
- Manufacturer: Ferrari S.p.A.
- Also called: Ferrari 599 GTB Fiorano
- Production: 2006–2012
- Model years: 2007–2012
- Assembly: Italy: Maranello
- Designer: Jason Castriota at Pininfarina

Body and chassis
- Class: Grand tourer (S)
- Body style: 2-door berlinetta 2-door roadster
- Layout: Front-mid engine, rear-wheel-drive
- Related: Ferrari 612 Scaglietti; Ferrari 599XX

Powertrain
- Engine: 6.0 L (5,999 cc) F140 C/CE V12
- Power output: 599 GTB Fiorano: 620 PS (456 kW; 612 hp); 599 GTO/SA Aperta: 670 PS (493 kW; 661 hp)
- Transmission: 6-speed manual 6-speed 'F1' automated manual

Dimensions
- Wheelbase: 2,750 mm (108.3 in)
- Length: 4,665 mm (183.7 in)
- Width: 1,962 mm (77.2 in)
- Height: 1,336 mm (52.6 in)
- Curb weight: 1,793 kg (3,953 lb) GTB 1,779 kg (3,922 lb) HGTE 1,746 kg (3,850 lb) GTO

Chronology
- Predecessor: Ferrari 575M Maranello
- Successor: Ferrari F12berlinetta

The Ferrari 599 GTB Fiorano (Type F141) is a grand tourer produced by the Italian automobile manufacturer Ferrari. It served as the brand's front-engined, two-seat model, replacing the 575M Maranello in 2006 as a 2007 model, and was later replaced for the 2013 model year by the F12berlinetta.

Styled by Pininfarina under the direction of Jason Castriota, the 599 GTB debuted at the Geneva Motor Show in February 2006. The bodywork features optimized aerodynamics with distinct sail panels flanking the rear window, directing and maximizing air flow to a linear rear nolder.

The 599 is named for its total engine displacement 5,999 cc (6.0 L), Gran Turismo Berlinetta nature, and the Fiorano Circuit test track used by Ferrari.

== Specifications ==
=== Drivetrain ===
The 6.0 L (5,999 cc) Tipo F140 C V12 engine utilised in the 599 produces a maximum power output of 460 kW; 610 hp (620 PS) between 7,600 rpm to 8,400 rpm, which made it the most powerful series production Ferrari road car at the time of its introduction. When introduced, the engine was one of the few engines whose output exceeded 75 kW; 101 PS (100 hp) per litre of displacement without the use of forced-induction such as supercharging or turbocharging. Its 608 N⋅m (448 lbf⋅ft) of torque produced at 5,600 rpm was also a record for Ferrari's GT cars at the time. Most of the modifications to the engine were done to allow it to fit in the 599's engine bay (the original version used in the Ferrari Enzo would be taller and would block forward vision due to its mid-mounted position construction).

A traditional 6-speed manual transmission was offered, as well as Ferrari's 6-speed automated manual paddle-shift transmission called "F1 SuperFast" which had a shift time of 100 milliseconds in the standard 599 or 85 milliseconds if equipped with the HGTE package. The 599 also saw the debut of Ferrari's new traction control system, F1-Trac. The vast majority of the 599 GTB's were equipped with the automated manual gearbox as opposed to the 6-speed manual gearbox. Only 30 examples were produced with a manual gearbox of which 20 were destined to the United States and 10 remained in Europe leading Ferrari to abandon the use of the manual transmission in its future GT cars. 599 GTB Fiorano was the last V12-engined Ferrari to be equipped with manual transmission.

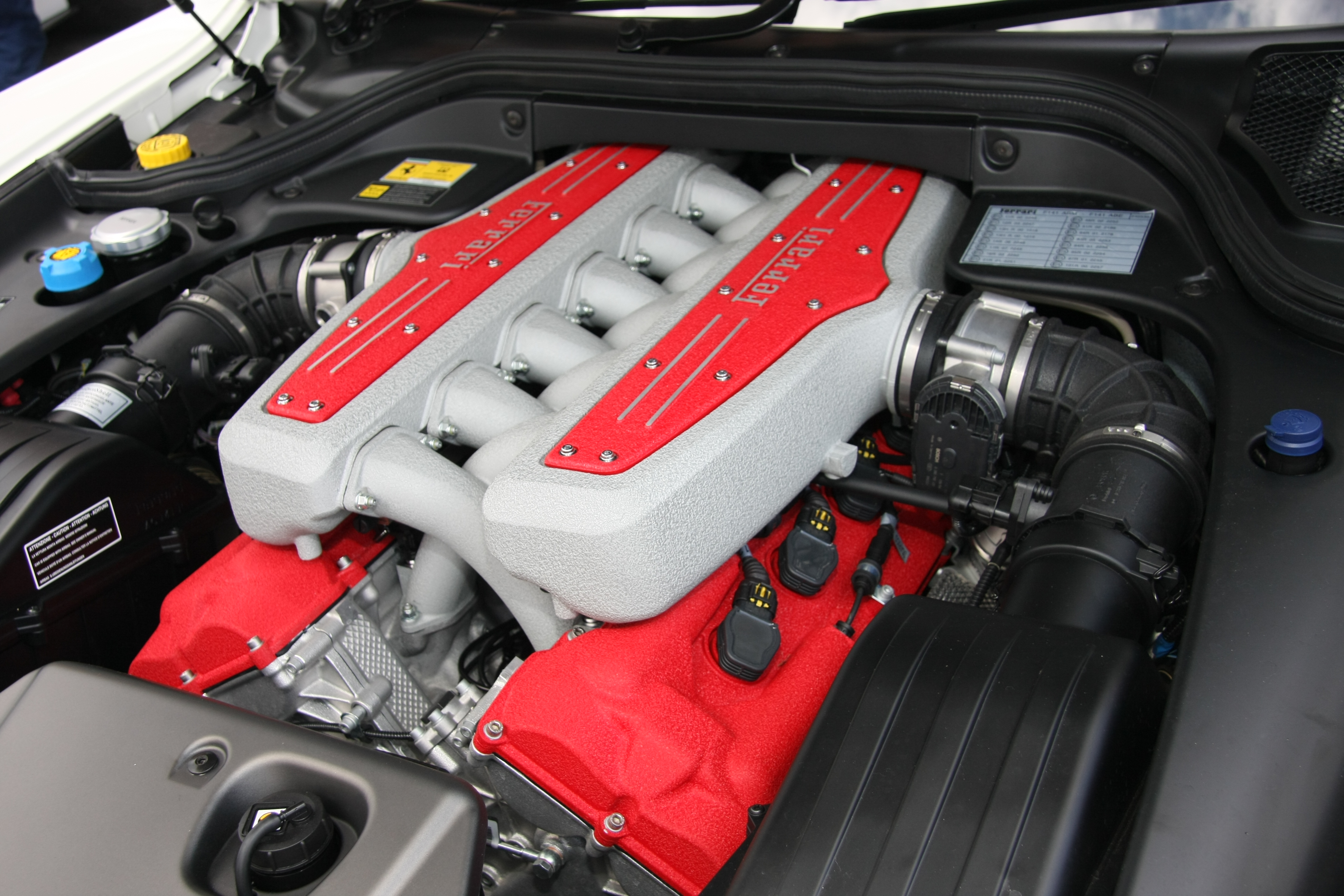
Ferrari F140 C V12 engine

Engine Installation	Type	Make	Bore × Stroke	CR	Valve Gear	Power	Torque	Red Line	Power-to-Weight Ratio
Front longitudinal	V12, petrol	Aluminium head and block	92 mm × 75.2 mm (3.62 in × 2.96 in)	11.2:1	4 per cylinder	456 kW; 612 hp (620 PS) at 7,600 rpm	608 N⋅m (448 lbf⋅ft) at 5,600 rpm	8,400 rpm	270 kW; 362 hp (367 PS) per tonne

=== Chassis ===
The 599 saw the use of an aluminium chassis for the first time in a Ferrari GT car, as opposed to the tubular steel chassis used in its predecessors. The new chassis results in more rigidity and contributes to the low dry weight of 1,690 kg (3,726 lb) as compared to its predecessor, the 575M. The 599 has a longer wheelbase than its predecessor and the fuel tank is positioned at the rear in a mid mounted position for better weight distribution. Due to such measures, the 599 has a claimed power to weight ratio of 367 PS per tonne.

=== Aerodynamics ===
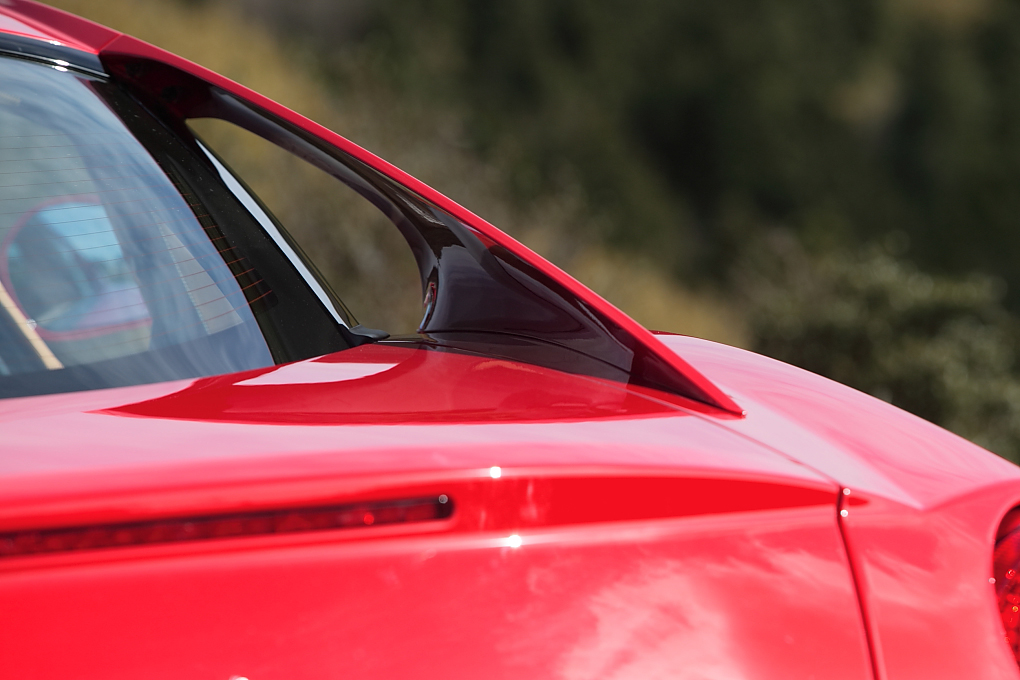
The C-pillar shaped like an arch guided air to the rear section to help keep the car on the ground

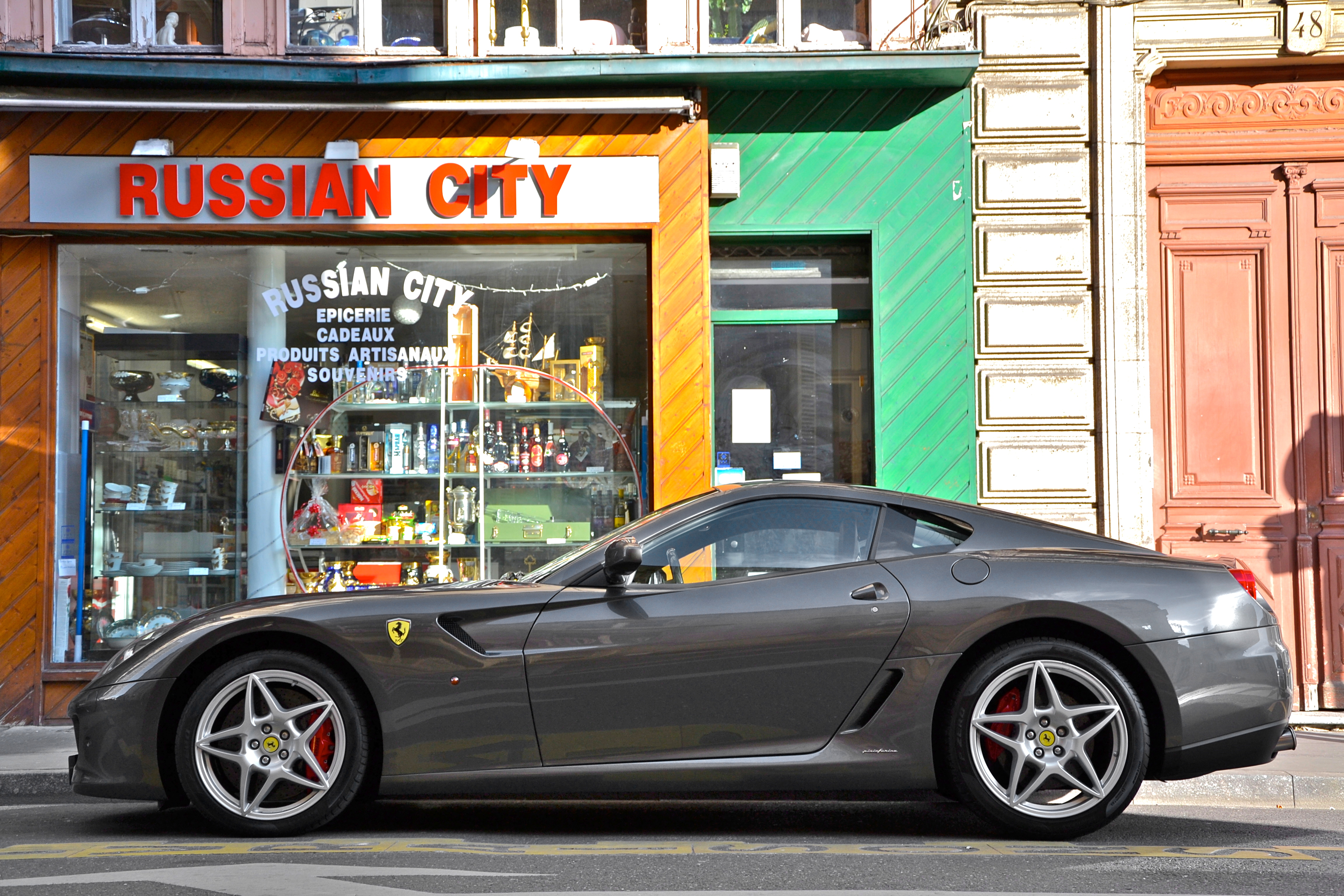
The side profile of the 599

The 599 utilises an underbody spoiler and venturi tunnels that contribute to downforce. The arched C-pillars in a 'flying buttress' style also aid further in downforce by channeling the air around the rear section thus eliminating the need of a rear wing. The buttresses were initially a styling exercise by exterior designer Jason Castriota. Their aerodynamic effect was proven by Ferrari aerodynamicist Luca Caldirola with the wind tunnel testing. Due to this fact, the 599 generates a claimed 160 kg (353 lb) of downforce at 300 km/h (186 mph). The car also has functional brake cooling ducts on the front and rear body panels for improved brake cooling.

=== Suspension and brakes ===
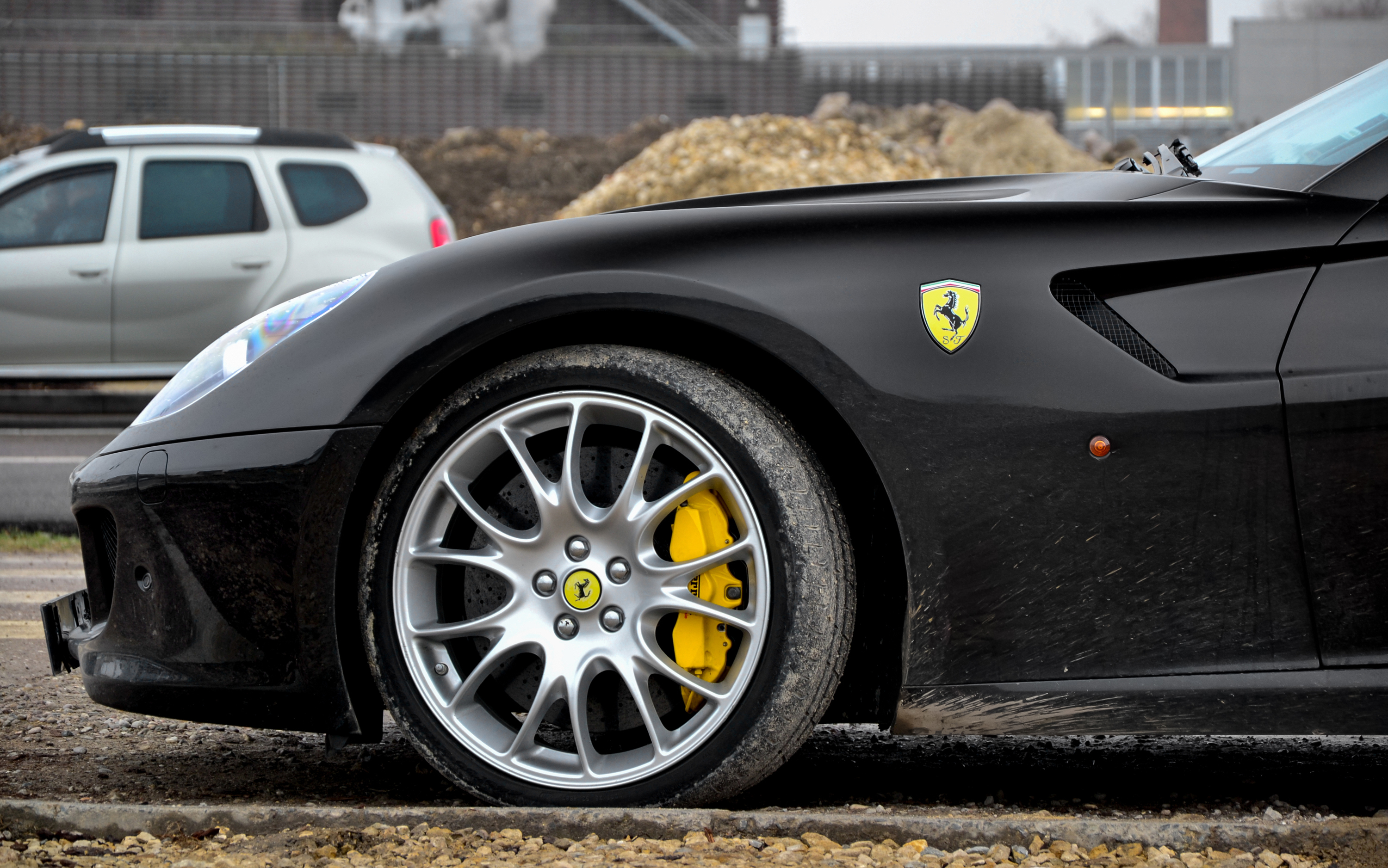
The optional Carbon-Ceramic brakes

The 599 utilises magnetorheological semi-active dampers along with its suspension coils. The dampers function by a liquid within the damper reservoir which when subject to magnetic field within the liquid chamber, changes its viscosity. The function of the liquid along with the reaction and stability control are controlled through a knob on the steering wheel. The 599 came with cast iron brakes as standard while the carbon-ceramic brakes (a technology that was scarcely utilised in road cars at the time) were available as an option. The rotors measured 398 mm (15.7 in) at the front and 360 mm (14 in) at the rear.

=== Interior ===
The 599 came with a luxurious leather trimmed interior. The driver's seat was positioned slightly towards the centre in order to provide a better driving position. The instrument cluster was a combination of analogue gauges and screens. The shift paddles could either be optioned in aluminium or in carbon fibre and were affixed to the steering column. The three spoke steering wheel housed controls for the car's electronic systems as well as a starter button. The interior has a glove box, storage space in the door panels and combination of simple dials and buttons for operating the stereo, climate control and air conditioning. The car has a rear shelf and a boot-lid providing adequate boot space.

=== Performance ===
Performance claimed by Ferrari.

- 0-100 km/h (62 mph) in 3.7 seconds
- 0-200 km/h (124 mph) in 11.1 seconds
- Top speed: 330 km/h (205.05 mph)

Motor Trend tested a 599 GTB Fiorano in January 2007. The car accelerated from 0-60 mph (97 km/h) in 3.2 seconds (with 1 foot rollout subtracted), 0-100 mph (161 km/h) in 7.1 seconds, and ran the quarter-mile in 11.3 seconds at 126.4 mph. Braking from 60-0 mph took 105 feet.

== Variants ==
=== 599 HGTE ===
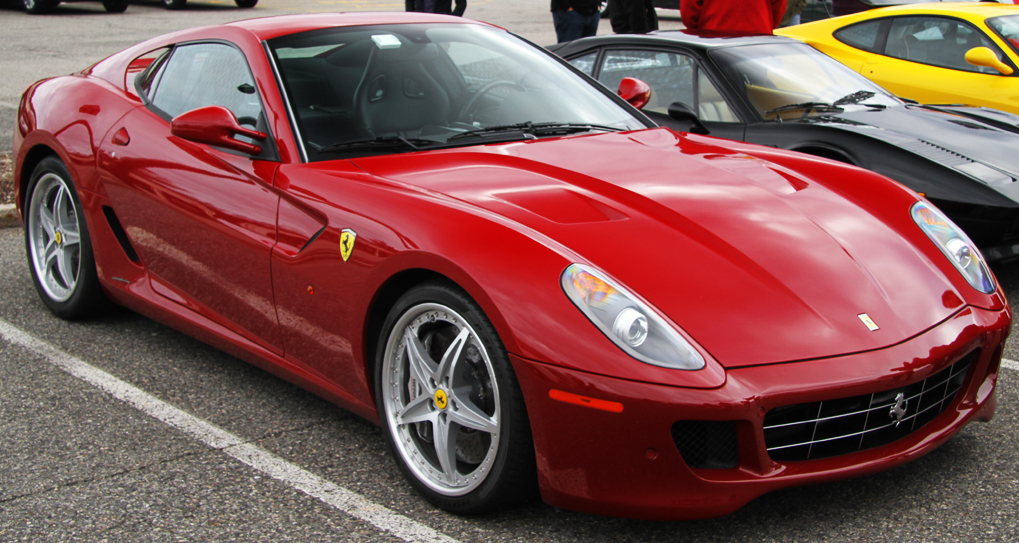
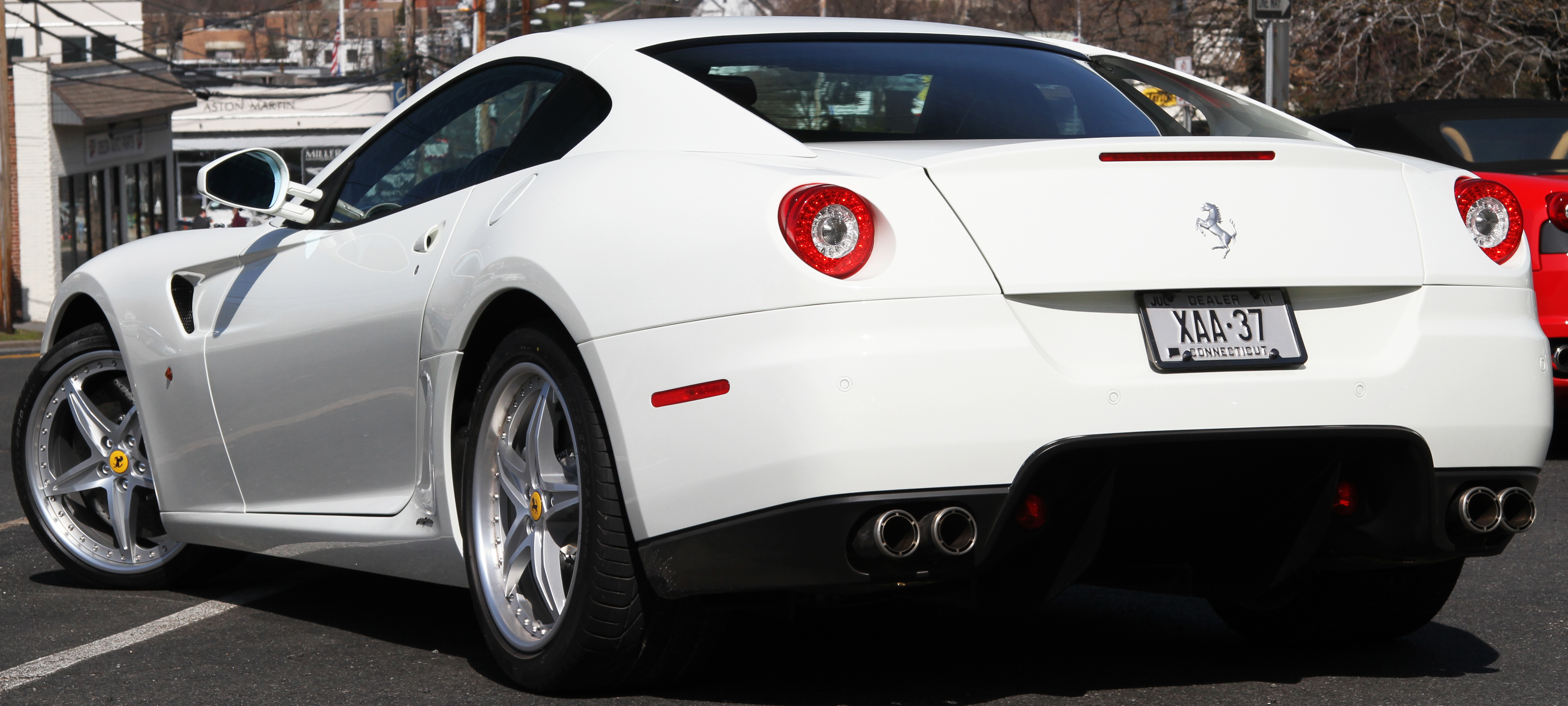
Ferrari 599 HGTE

The Ferrari 599 GTB Fiorano HGTE (HGTE being an abbreviation of Handling Gran Turismo Evoluzione) is an upgrade package for the 599 designed to improve the car's handling. It includes a modified set-up with stiffer springs and rear anti-roll bar as well as new calibration settings for the Delphi MagneRide magneto-rheological shock absorbers when the manettino is at its sportier settings. The ride height has also been lowered, resulting in a low centre of gravity. The package also includes optimised tyres featuring a compound that offers improved grip. The car's electronic systems were also changed. The gearbox's shift times were faster in high-performance settings, while new engine software provided improved response. The exhaust was modified to produce a more marked and thrilling sound under hard usage while still delivering the right comfort levels at cruising speed. The exterior and interior were upgraded with more carbon fibre components and the car also included new 20-inch wheels.

=== 599 GTO ===
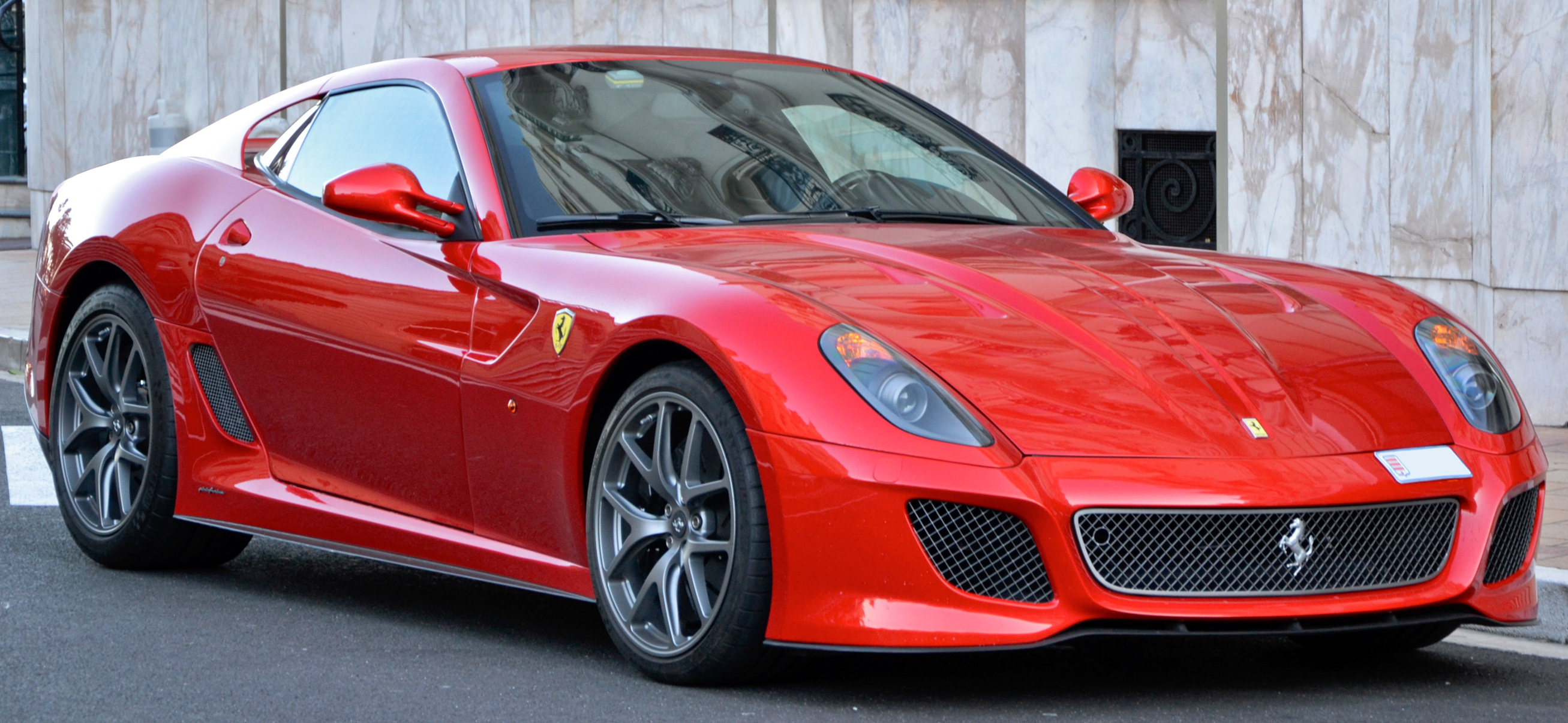
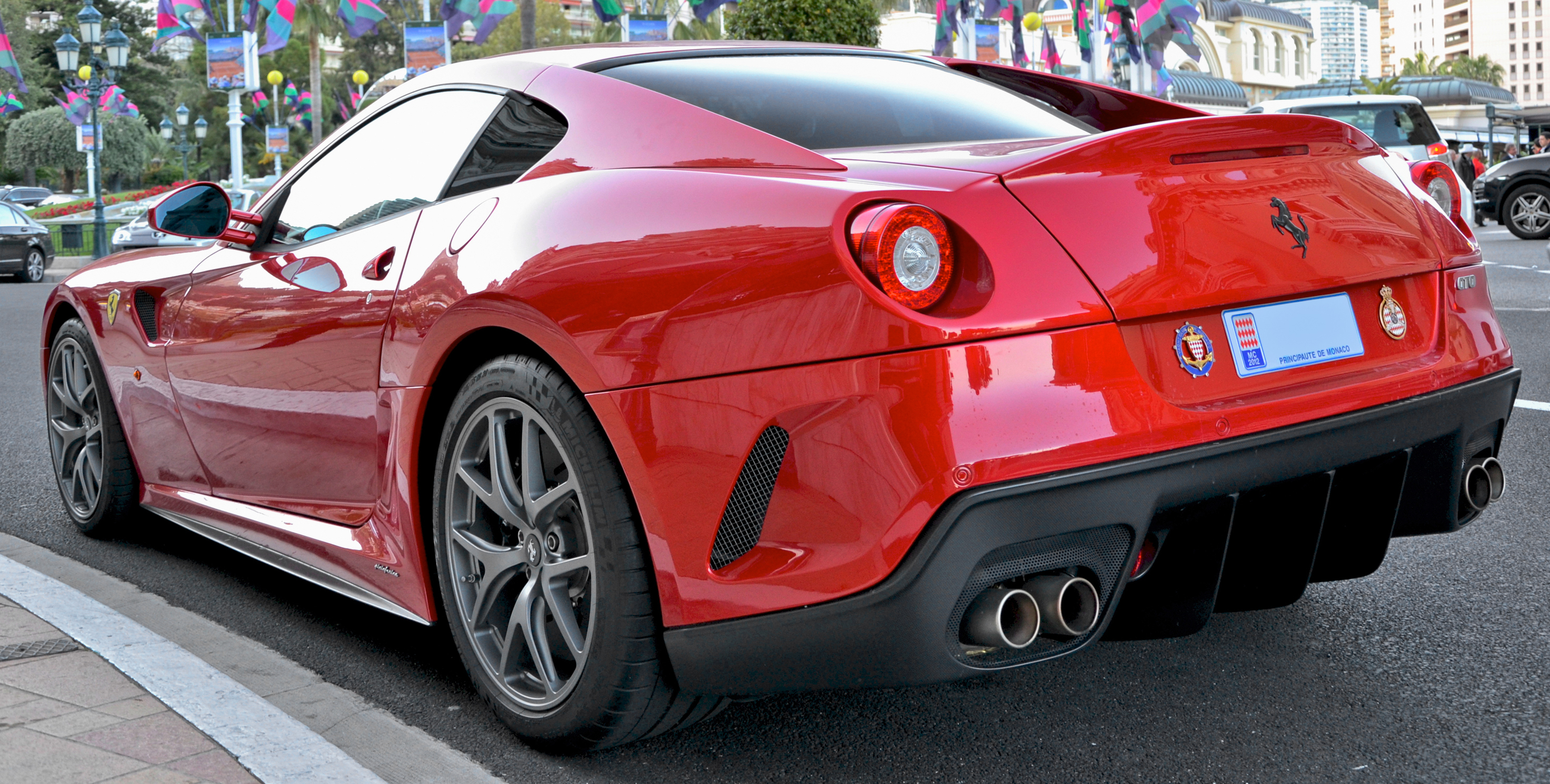
Ferrari 599 GTO

On 8 April 2010, Ferrari announced official details of the 599 GTO (for Gran Turismo Omologato). The car was a road-legal version of the 599XX track day car and at the time Ferrari claimed that the 599 GTO was their fastest ever road car, able to lap the Fiorano test circuit in 1 minute 24 seconds, one second faster than the Ferrari Enzo. Its engine generated a power output of 490 kW; 660 hp (670 PS) at 8,250 rpm and 620 N⋅m (457 lb⋅ft) of torque at 6,500 rpm. The car has the multiple shift program for the gearbox from the 599XX along with the exhaust system. Ferrari claimed that the 599 GTO could accelerate from 0–100 km/h (0–62 mph) in under 3.3 seconds and has a top speed of over 335 km/h (208 mph). At 1,605 kg (3,538 lb), the 599 GTO weighs almost 100 kg (220 lb) less than the standard GTB. Production was to be limited to 599 cars. Of these, approximately 125 were produced for the United States market.

Ferrari has produced only two other models that used the GTO designation: the 1962 250 GTO and the 1984 288 GTO with the third being the 599 GTO. Unlike the previous GTOs however, the 599 GTO was not designed for homologation in any racing series.

=== 599XX ===
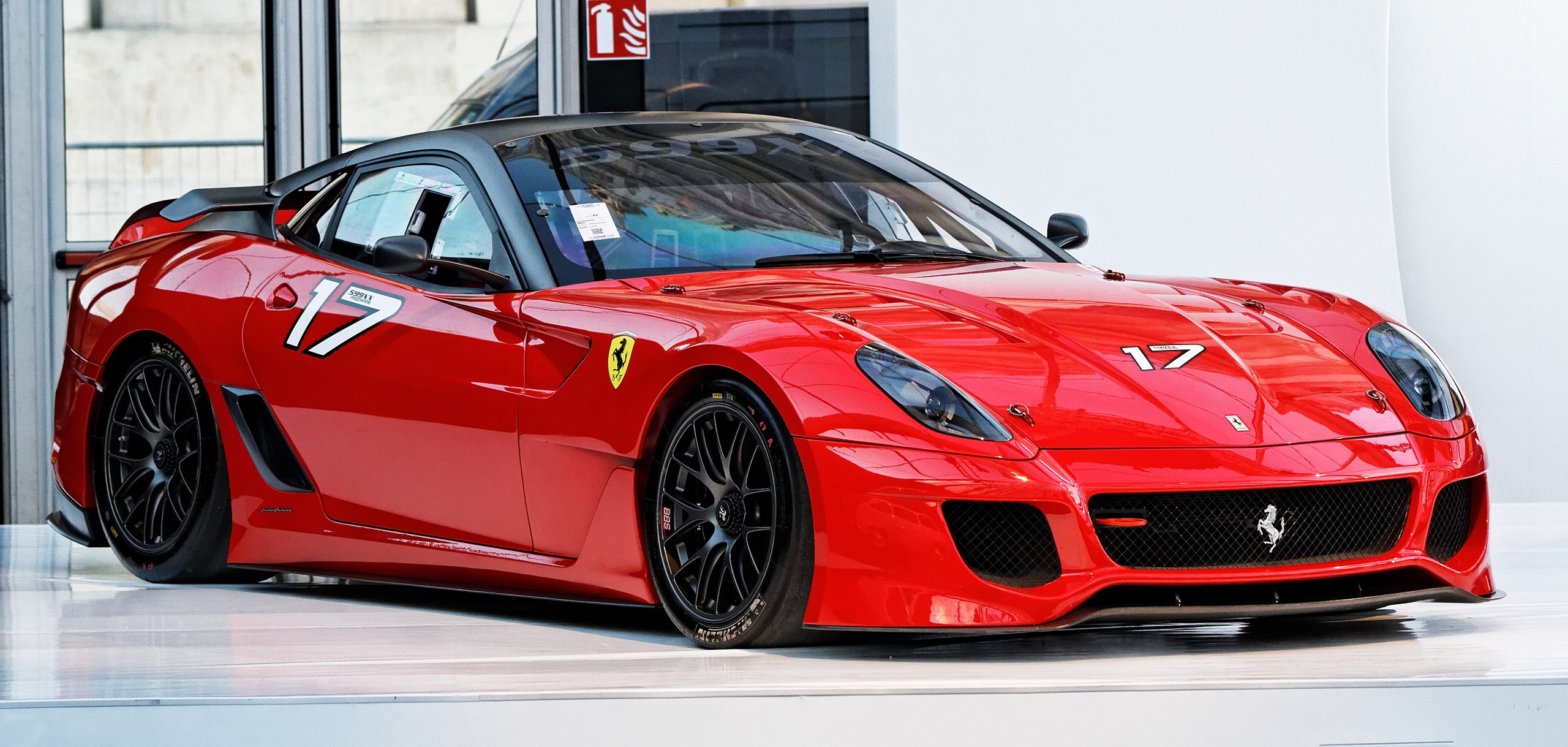
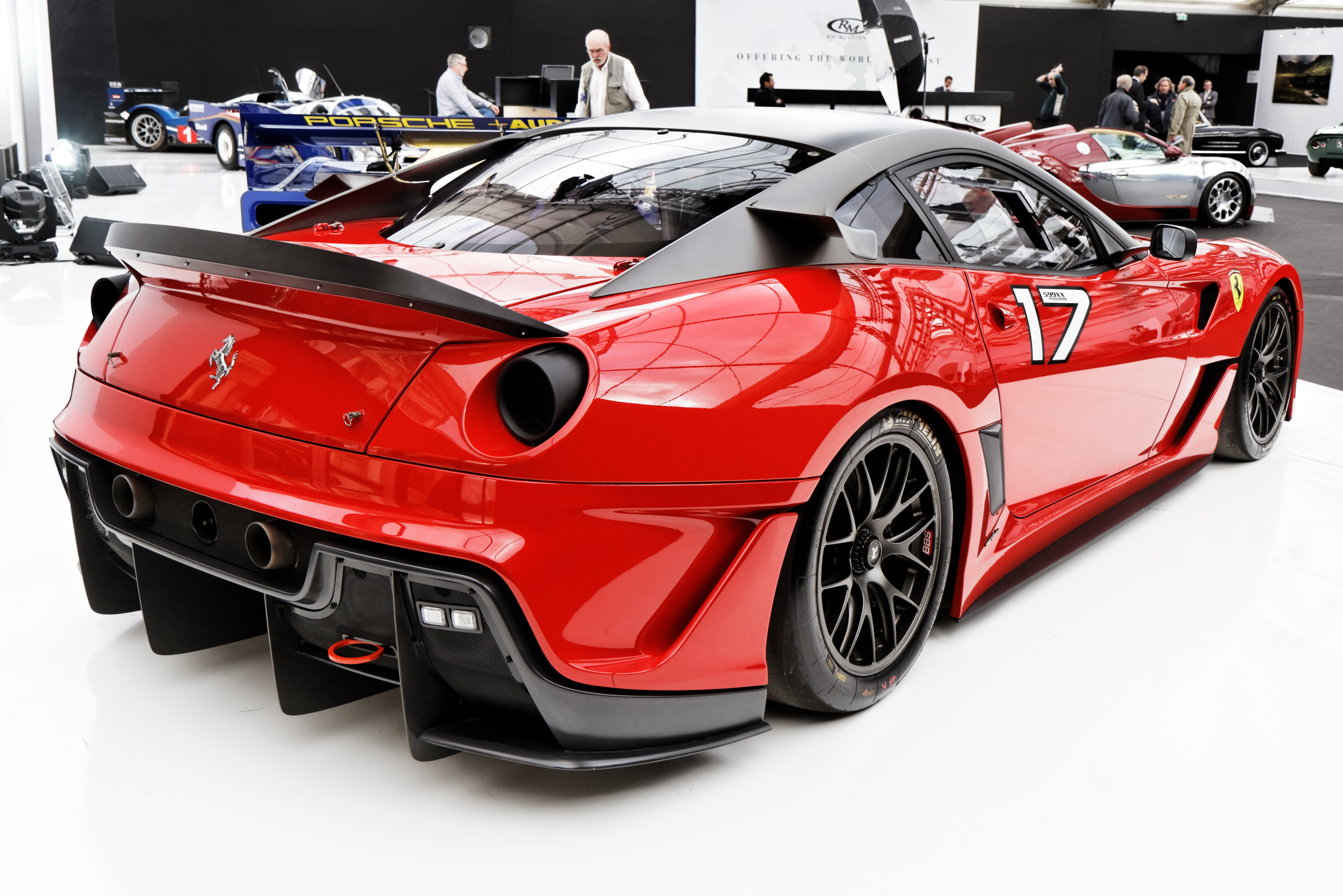
Ferrari 599XX

At the 2009 Geneva Motor Show, Ferrari unveiled the track-only iteration of the 599 GTB, dubbed the 599XX. Designed by Ferrari's Formula-one engineers, the car has many changes over the standard car in order to make it more nimble and responsive on a race track. Exterior enhancements included two winglets on the C-pillars for improved downforce, a vented bonnet for improved engine cooling, darkened lexan tail lamps, a carbon fibre 'ducktail' rear spoiler aiding further in downforce, a large rear diffuser for improved under body airflow, tow hooks at the front and rear, additional ducts for improved cooling, a minimalist race interior with racing bucket seats along with an LCD behind the steering wheel replacing all analogue gauges, and a roll-cage and lexan sliding windows. The car also has two fans that were located in the trunk and worked to keep the car on the ground and stopped working at speeds up to 250 km/h (155 mph), a speed at which the car needed no additional downforce. With all such components, the car was reported to generate 280 kg (617 lb) of downforce at 200 km/h (124 mph) and 630 kg (1,389 lb) of downforce at 300 km/h (186 mph). The air conditioning system was retained for added driver comfort. The car had nine traction and stability control modes, all controlled from the manettino dial on the steering wheel. The car was equipped with F1 inspired carbon ceramic brakes with crossed drilled rotors and a new race exhaust system. The rev limiter was raised to 9,000 rpm, with the engine rated at 540 kW; 720 hp (730 PS) at 9,000 rpm. Weight was reduced by reducing the weight of the engine components such as a new carbon fibre intake manifold and graphite coated pistons along with a lightweight crankshaft, as well as through the use of composite materials and the use of carbon fibre body parts. A new gearbox was introduced to cut overall gear change time to 60 milliseconds, holding the upward or downward shift paddle for longer resulted in multiple shifts that improved gearing time. The car also included 29/67 R19 front and 31/71 R19 rear racing slicks with 19 × 11J wheels at the front and 19 × 12J at the rear. The 599XX was capable of accelerating from 0–100 km/h (0–62 mph) in 2.9 seconds and attained a top speed of 315 km/h (196 mph) (redline limited top speed).

At the 2010 Beijing International Auto Show, Ferrari announced that the 599XX had completed the Nordschleife circuit at the Nürburgring in a time of 6 minutes and 58.16 seconds – the fastest lap time ever recorded for a production-derived sports car. This time was later beaten by the Pagani Zonda R in June 2010, which completed the lap in 6 minutes and 47.50 seconds.

=== 599XX Evoluzione ===
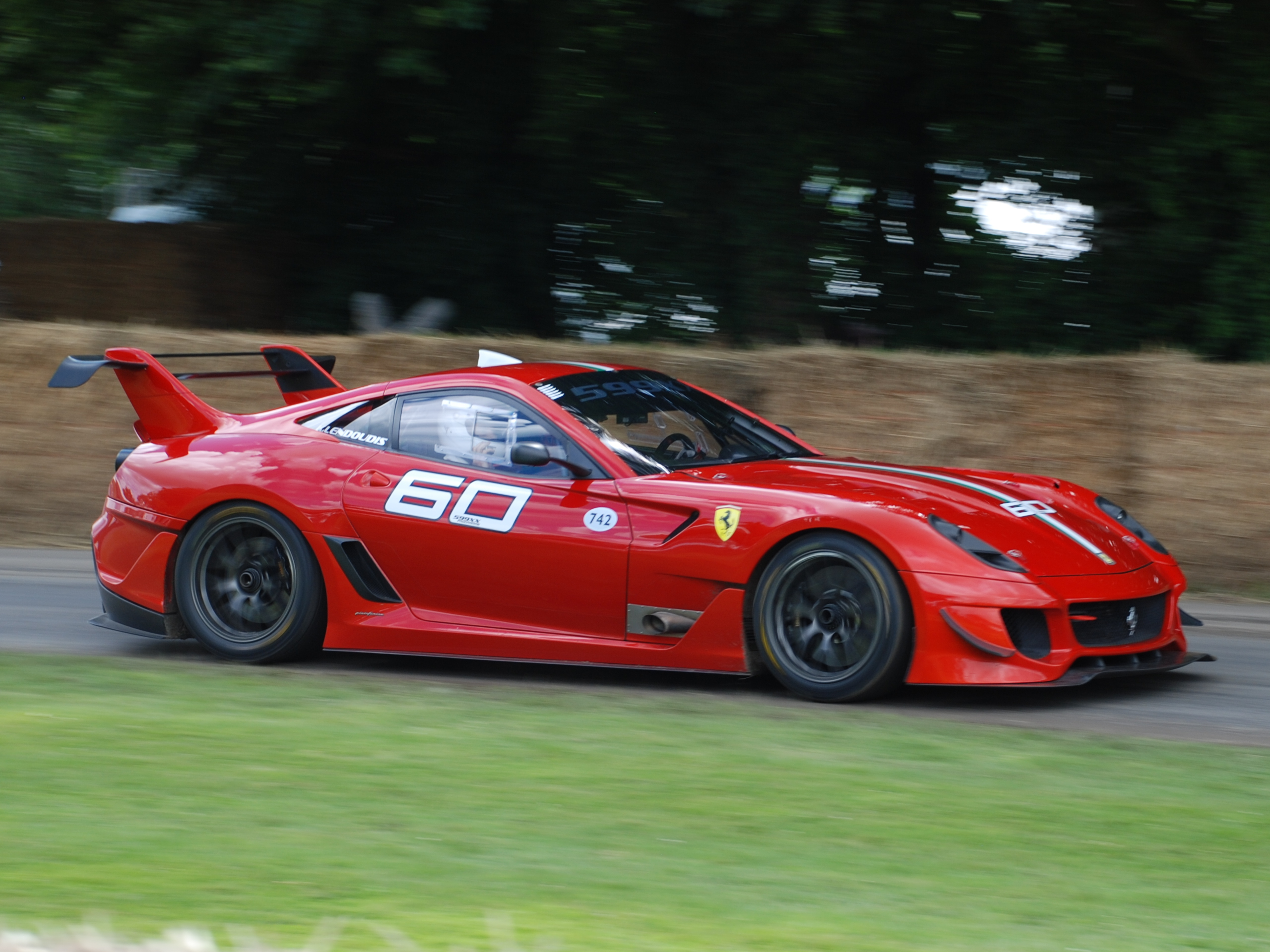
Ferrari 599XX Evoluzione

On November 10, 2011, the first images of the 599XX Evoluzione surfaced, which had a radically restyled aero and exhaust package as well as electronic upgrades and Pirelli racing slicks. On 1 December 2011, Ferrari confirmed details for the 599XX Evoluzione in preparation for the 2011 Bologna Motor Show. The 599XX Evoluzione weighed 35 kg (77 lb) less than the standard 599XX and the engine had slightly improved peak power of 540 kW; 730 hp (740 PS) and 700 N⋅m (516 lb⋅ft) of torque. One of the key features of the Evoluzione is its active rear wing which can adjust automatically to provide increased cornering performance.

== Special variants ==
=== SA Aperta ===
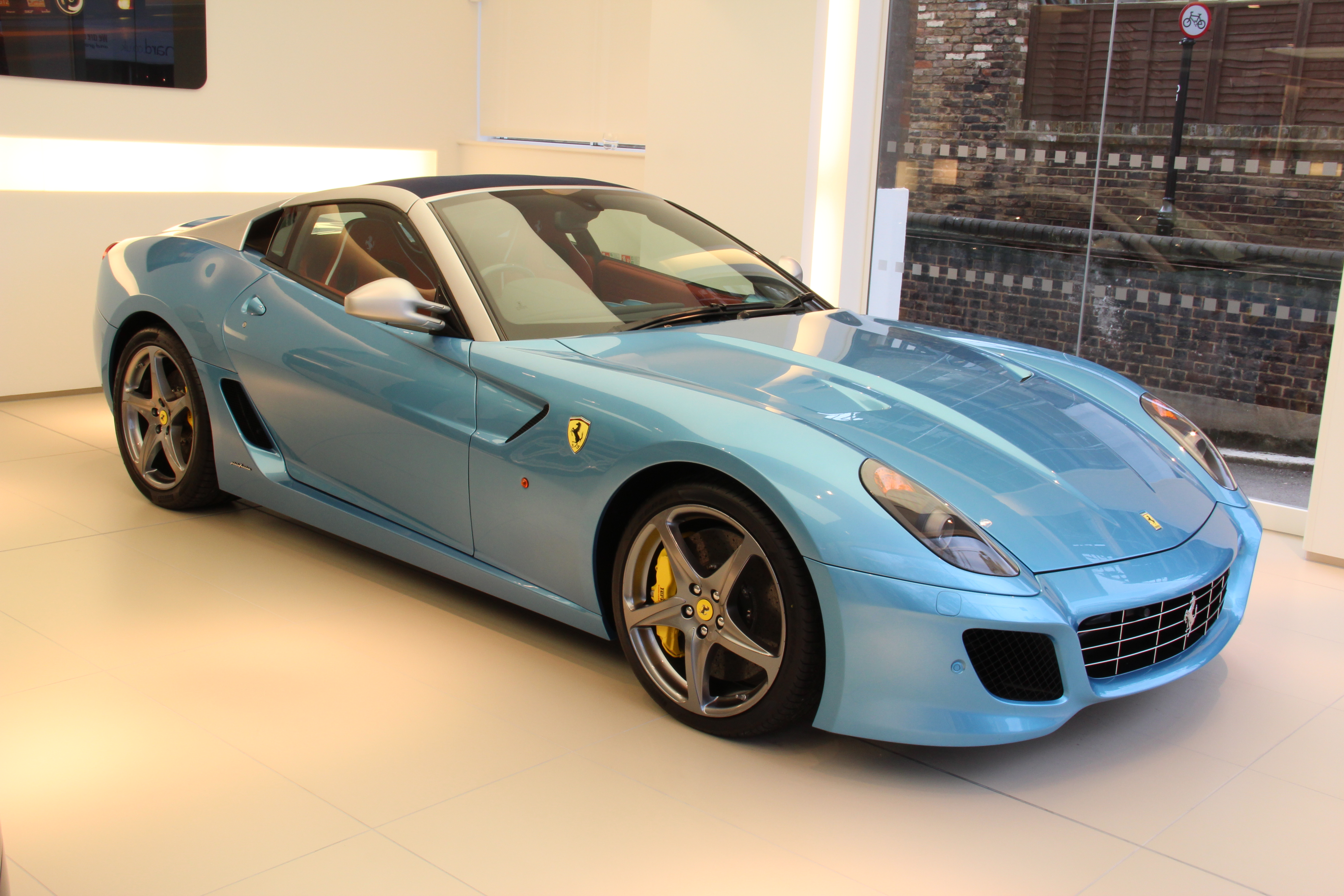
Ferrari SA Aperta

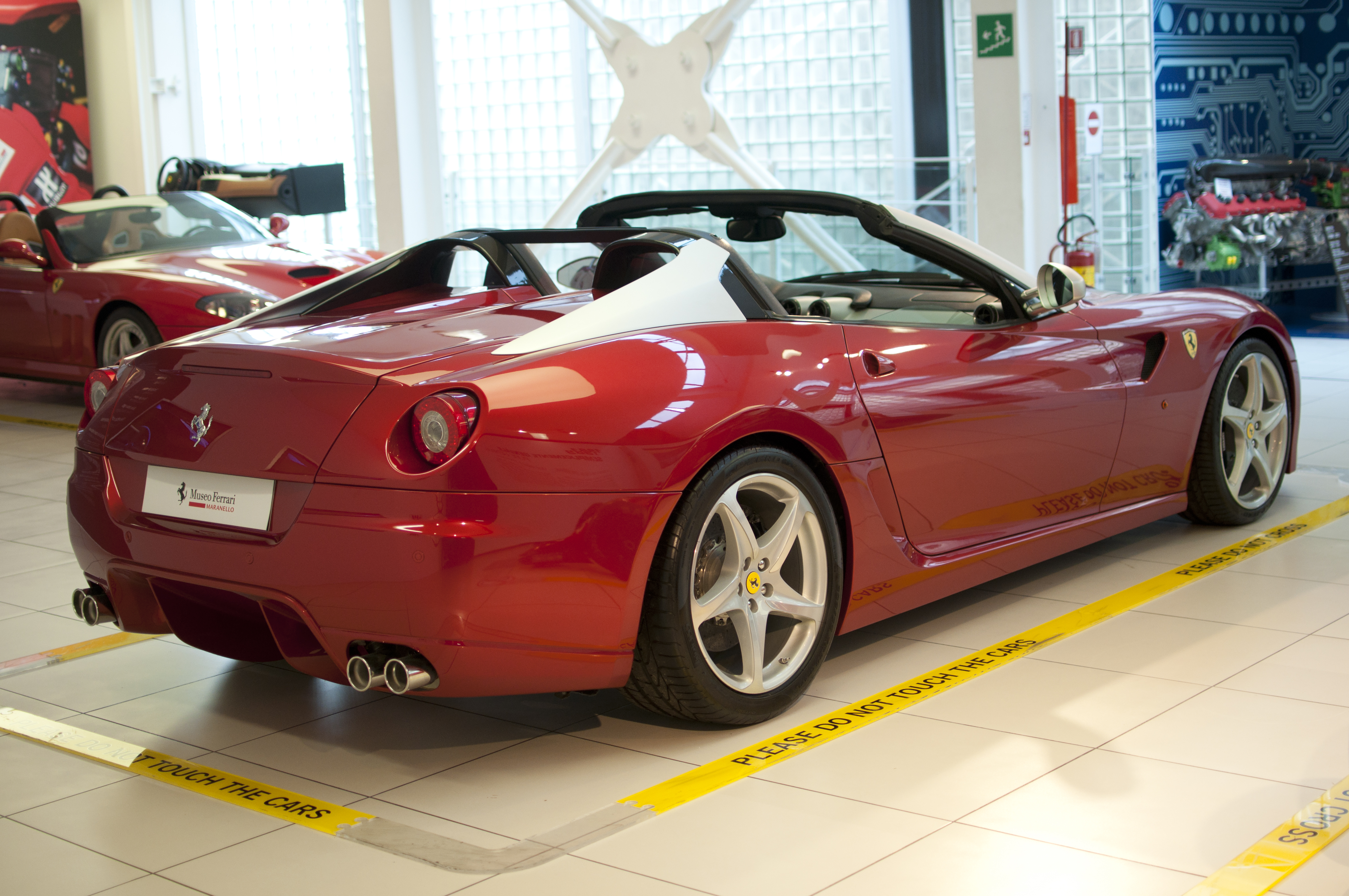
Rear view with the roof removed

The roadster variant of the 599, the SA Aperta, was introduced at the 2010 Paris Motor Show as a limited edition in honour of designers Sergio Pininfarina and Andrea Pininfarina, with the "SA" designation standing for both their names. The SA Aperta utilised the higher performance engine and gearbox from the 599 GTO and has a 10 mm (0.4 in) lower ride height, thicker rear anti roll bar and recalibrated magnetic dampers. The SA Aperta also has a slightly raked windscreen as compared to the 599 GTB along with larger cooling ducts in the new front bumper and a rear bumper in body colour. The car has a removable soft top that was only intended for use in city driving and to protect the interior from rain. The boot-lid was made of aluminium while the C-pillars were made of carbon fibre and have a silver finish along with the windshield frame. The exhaust system was a modified version of the one used in the 599XX and the car has special 5-spoke wheels unique to the variant with a chromed finish along with a triple layer body paint. The interior was also redesigned and has a two-tone colour scheme and the car has sports seats as standard equipment. Only 80 examples were produced, honoring the 80th anniversary of Pininfarina and all were sold before the car was unveiled to the public.

Power (at rpm)	Torque (at rpm)	Acceleration to 100 km/h (62 mph)	Top speed
493 kW (670 PS; 661 hp) at 8,250 rpm	620 N⋅m (457 lb⋅ft) at 6,500 rpm	3.6 sec	325 km/h (202 mph)

=== 599 GTB 60F1 ===
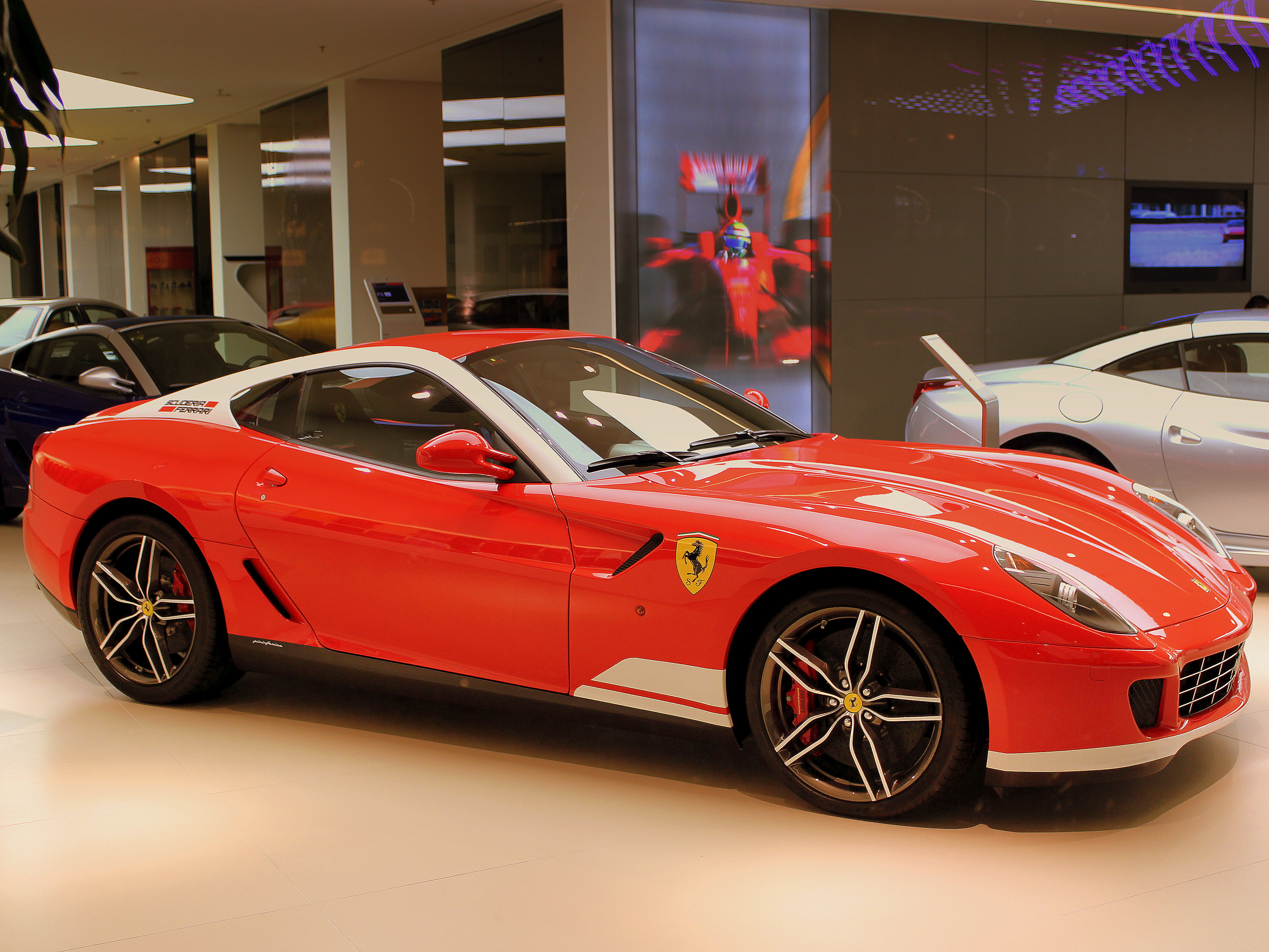
Ferrari 599 GTB 60F1

In December 2011, Ferrari announced a special edition of the 599 GTB to celebrate 60 years of their wins in F1. From Froilán González's win at Silverstone in 1951 with the 375 F1, to Fernando Alonso's win at Silverstone in 2011 in the 150° Italia, Ferrari have been winning hundreds of F1 races. The car was based on the 599 HGTE chassis, that utilised stiff suspension, shorter springs and stiffer anti-roll bars. The new 20" diamond-finished forged alloy wheels and Scuderia Ferrari shields came on the body as standard. There were three choices of paint finishes to choose from:

- The colours of the 375 F1 – darker and standing out more than Ferrari Rosso
- The colours of the 150° Italia, with the Italian tricolore styled mini spoiler at the back and the white parts of the front spoiler on the body
- Another version of the 150° Italia but without the white a-pillars.

The interior in the European version of the car has Sabelt bucket seats whereas the US version featured Recaro bucket seats, both being made from Alcantara.

== One-off models ==
=== P540 Superfast Aperta ===
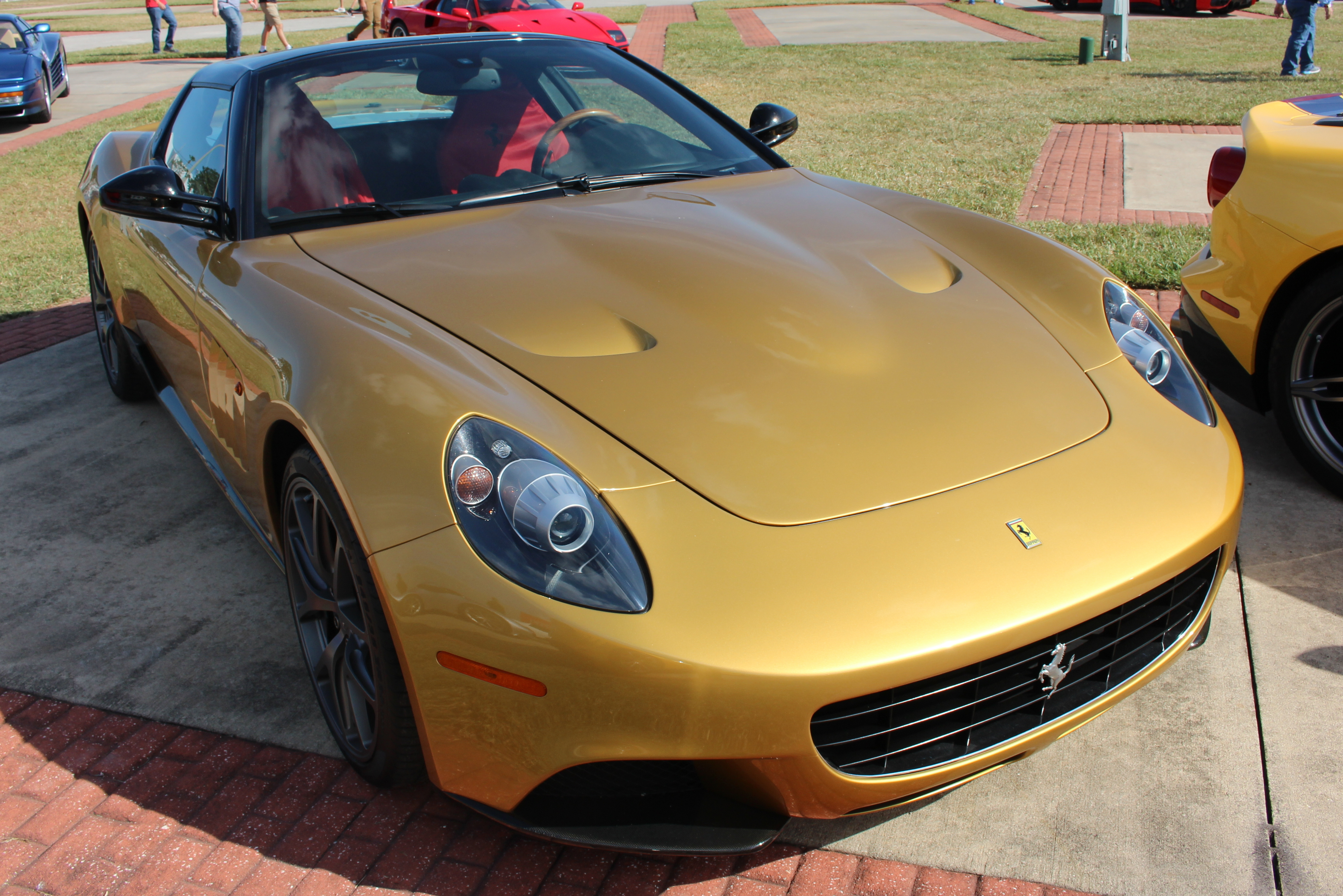
Ferrari P540 Superfast Aperta at the 2016 Ferrari Finali Mondiali in Daytona, Florida

The Ferrari P540 Superfast Aperta is a one-off convertible sports car based on the Ferrari 599 GTB Fiorano. This car is the second car in Ferrari's Special Project program.

Edward Walson commissioned the car in 2008, asking Ferrari to build a modern interpretation of the gold covered Carrozzeria Fantuzzi-bodied Ferrari 330 LMB built for the 1968 film Spirits of the Dead. The P540 was revealed to the public on 11 December 2009, but had been spotted in spy shots several months previous to this.

Designed by Pininfarina and built in Maranello, this car was designed to comply with international safety and homologation requirements. Using finite element analysis and carbon fibre, the car's chassis was stiffened for the conversion to a convertible body style. As it is based on the 599 GTB F1, many of the specifications of the P540 are similar to its donor car. Total time of development was 14 months.

=== Superamerica 45 ===
The Ferrari Superamerica 45 is a one-off with a rotating targa hardtop based on the 599 GTB, that was commissioned to Ferrari by longtime Ferrari enthusiast and collector Peter Kalikow to commemorate his 45 years as a Ferrari client. Part of Ferrari's Special Project programme, it was designed at Centro Stile Ferrari and engineered in-house by Ferrari. The car made its public debut at Concorso d'Eleganza Villa d'Este on 20 May 2011.

The carbon fibre hardtop roof incorporates a rear screen and rotates around a horizontal axis behind the cabin, a mechanism similar to that of the 2005 Ferrari Superamerica. The boot, also made from carbon fibre, has been redesigned to house the roof when open and to increase downforce at the rear of the car. As well as being finished in Blu Antille, other key visual features include a chromed front grille, body coloured wheels, carbon fibre panels and special burnished aluminum A-pillars, wing mirrors and door handles.

The interior features a combination of Cuoio leather trim and Blu Scuro carbon fibre as well as a latest-generation touch-screen infotainment system.

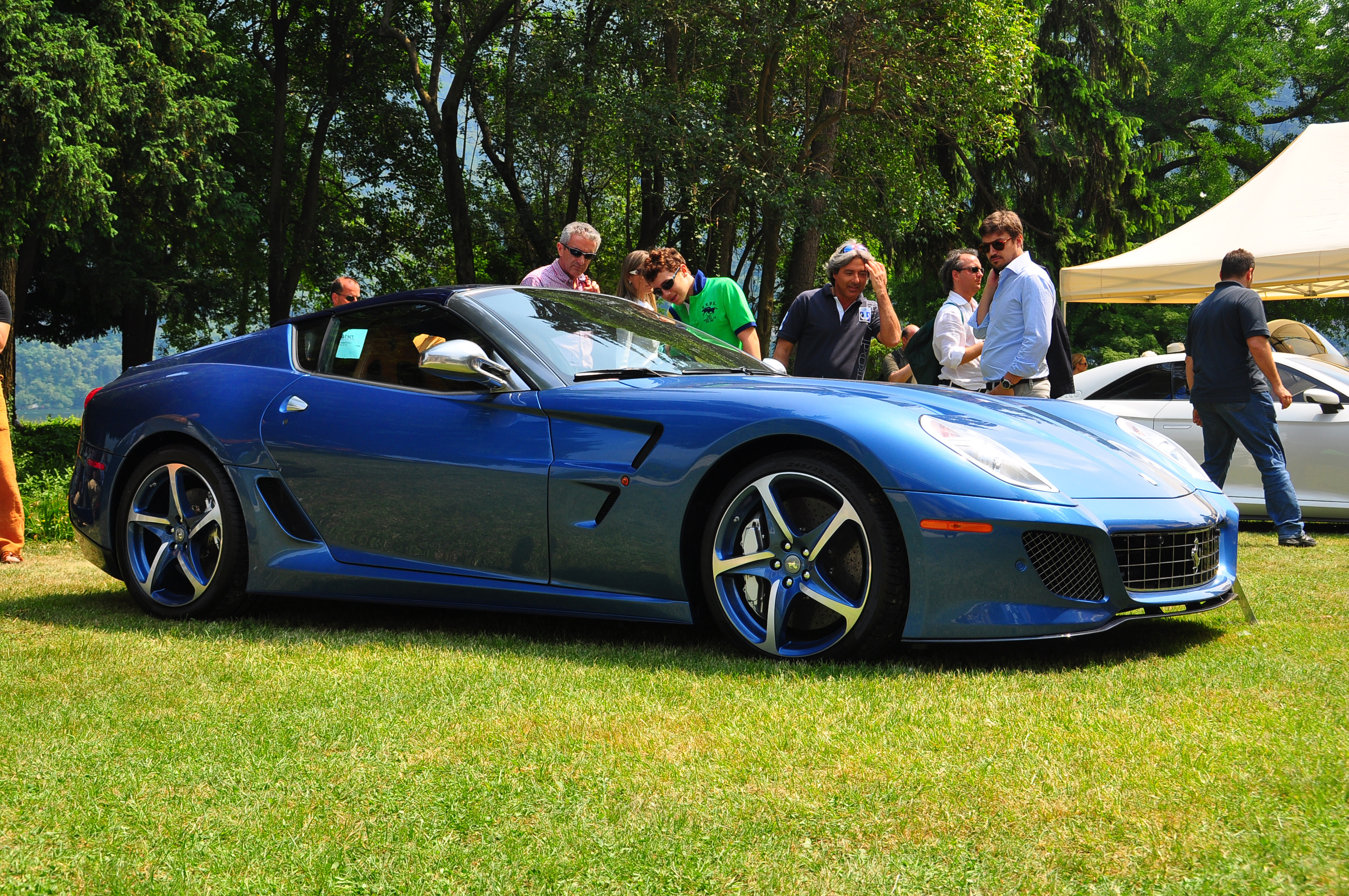
Right side view at Villa d'Este in 2011

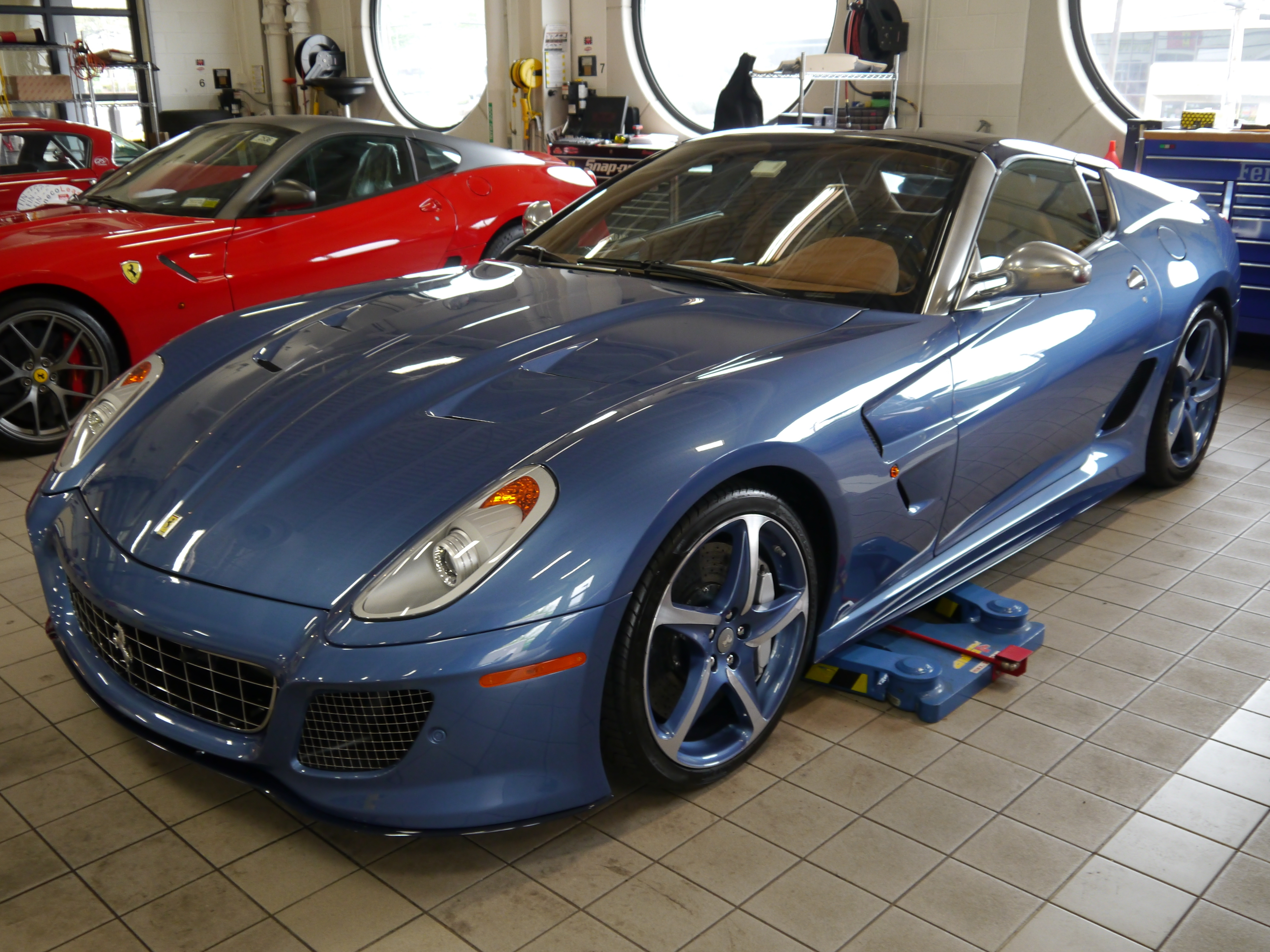
Front left view

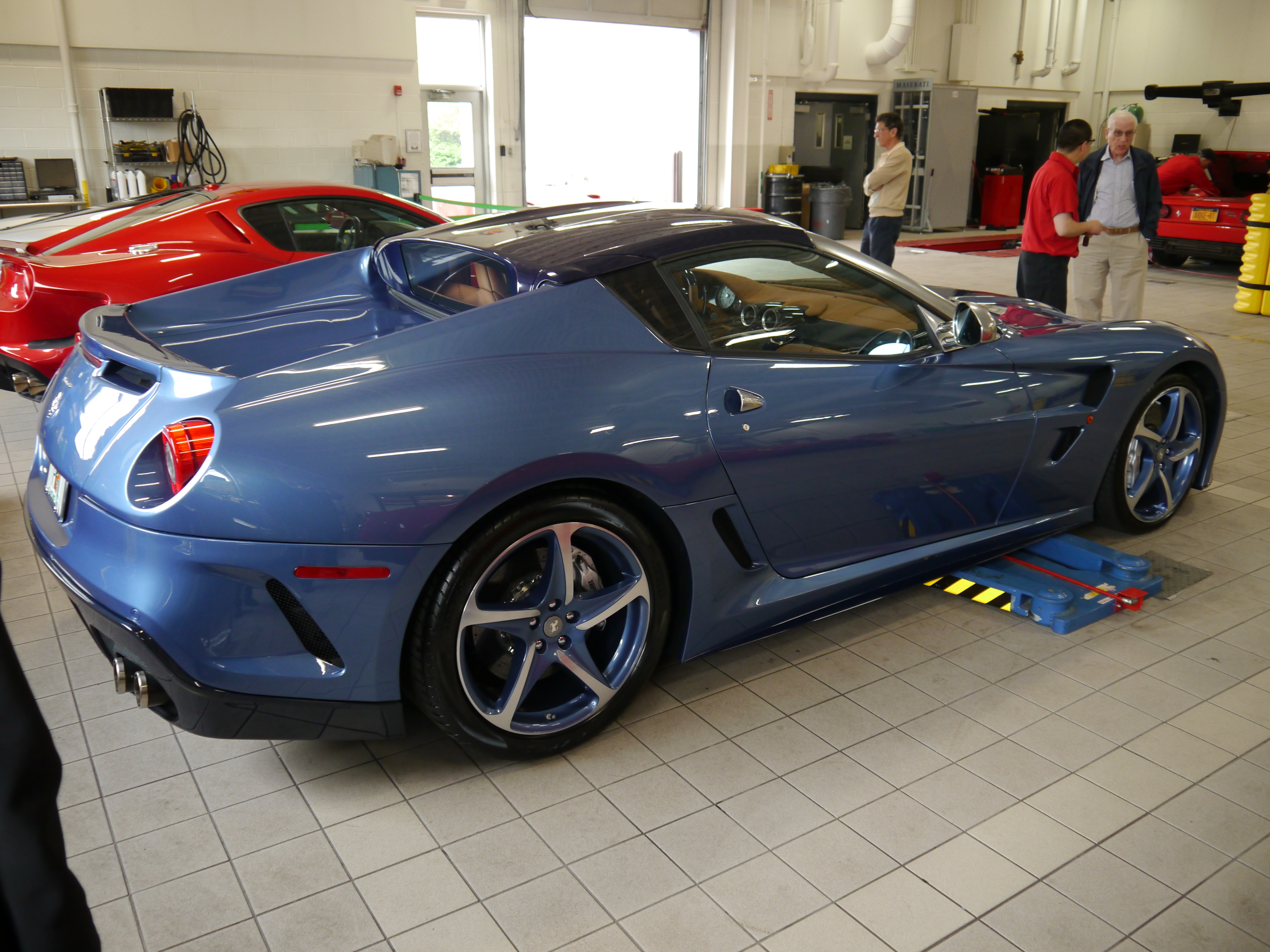
Rear right view

=== 599 GTZ Nibbio Zagato ===
The Zagato 599 GTZ Nibbio was introduced in 2007 by Zagato and is based on the Ferrari 599 GTB. It was limited to only nine units worldwide, seven of which were built with the F1 automated manual transmission and two with the 6-speed manual. Two of the cars with the F1 automated manual transmission are spyders. The manual coupé car, painted dark blue with a white top half, was listed for sale in December 2018 for US$1.495 million at Tomini Classics in Dubai. The design of the GTZ Nibbio is inspired by various coachbuilt sports from the 1950s and 1960s.

Transmission	Body style	Chassis no.	Exterior color	Interior color	Wheels	Registration	Note
Manual	Coupe	149428	Dark blue with white top	Dark and light blue	5-spoke wheels introduced with the SA Aperta		Was listed for sale at Tomini Classics. Now believed to reside in Spain.
F1	Coupe	168018	Light blue with white accents on edges	Dark brown	5-spoke wheels introduced with the SA Aperta	Seen on Swiss plates GR 151868	
F1	Coupe	185911	Red	Tan	7 double-spokes wheels	Seen on Swiss plates BS 5599	
F1	Coupe		Black	Unknown	599 GTB Fiorano wheels	Seen on Saudi plates 3000 LTA	
F1	Spyder	ZFFFD60B000165830	Silver with light silver accents on edges	Black with white stitching	7 double-spokes wheels		Offered at auction by RM Sotheby's in February 2021. Completed by Zagato in January 2020.
F1	Spyder	170002	White	Cream and blue	5-spoke wheels introduced with the SA Aperta		Offered at auction in Saudi Arabia in November 2019 by Silverstone Auctions
F1	Spyder	170826	Dark red with white accents on edges	White	5-spoke wheels introduced with the SA Aperta	Seen on Swiss plates GR 10956	
F1	Spyder		Dark blue	White and cream	599 GTB Fiorano HGTE wheels	Seen on Swiss plates BS 5970	
Manual	Spyder	159626	Light blue	Dark purple	20 inches 5 double-spokes diamond cut forged alloy wheels (as available on the 599 GTB 60F1)	Seen on UK plates AX57TXH	

=== SP30 ===
Ferrari SP30

The Ferrari SP30 is a one-off based on the 599 GTO and completed in 2013. It is the fifth project completed by Ferrari's special projects division and it includes elements from the 599XX and the F12 which was released a few months earlier. It was commissioned by Cheerag Arya, the owner of a petrochemical company. The car's VIN is ZFF70RDT7B0188026. The car was then seized by the government of Abu Dhabi and was exported to the USA where it still resides today.

== Prototype ==
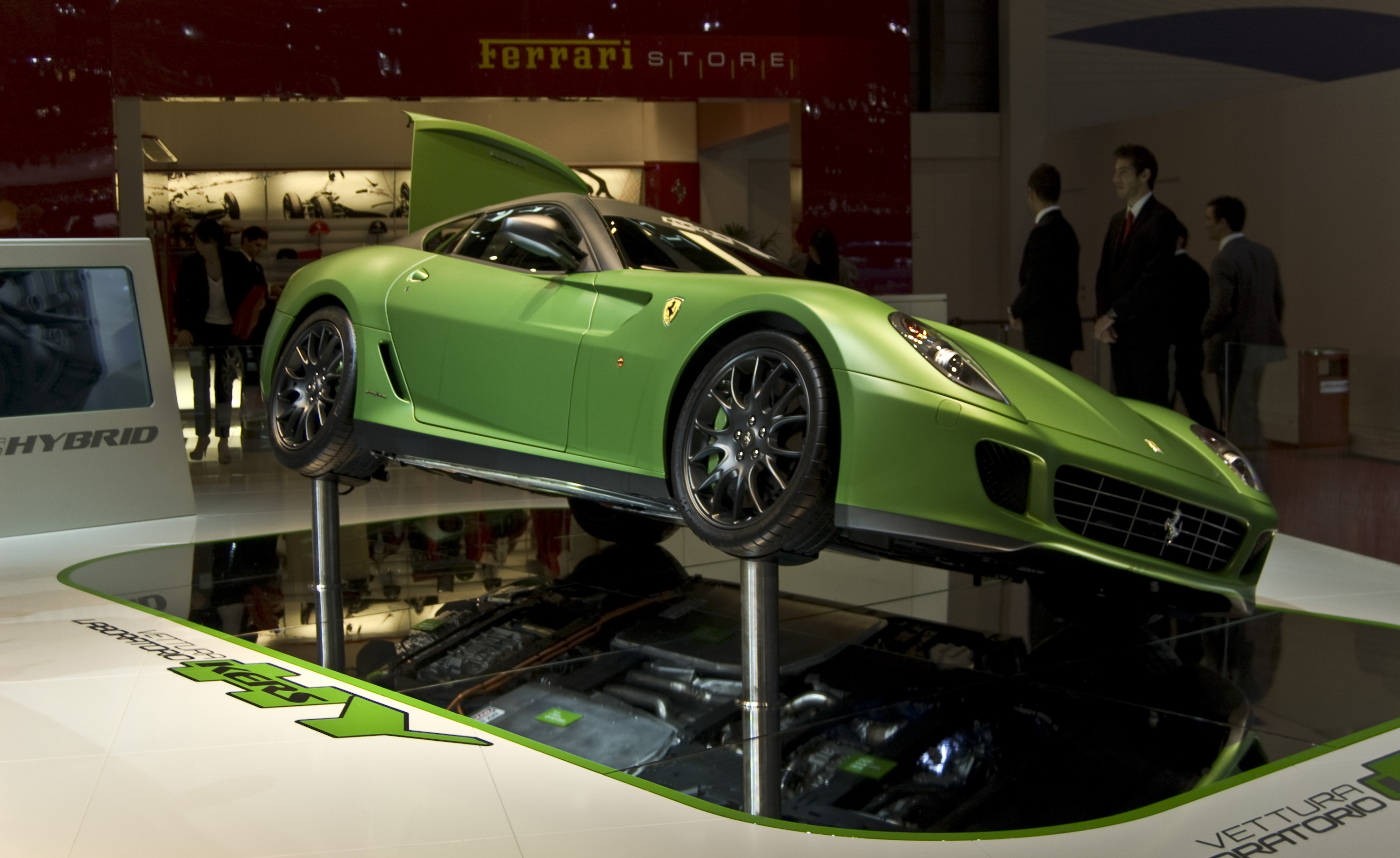
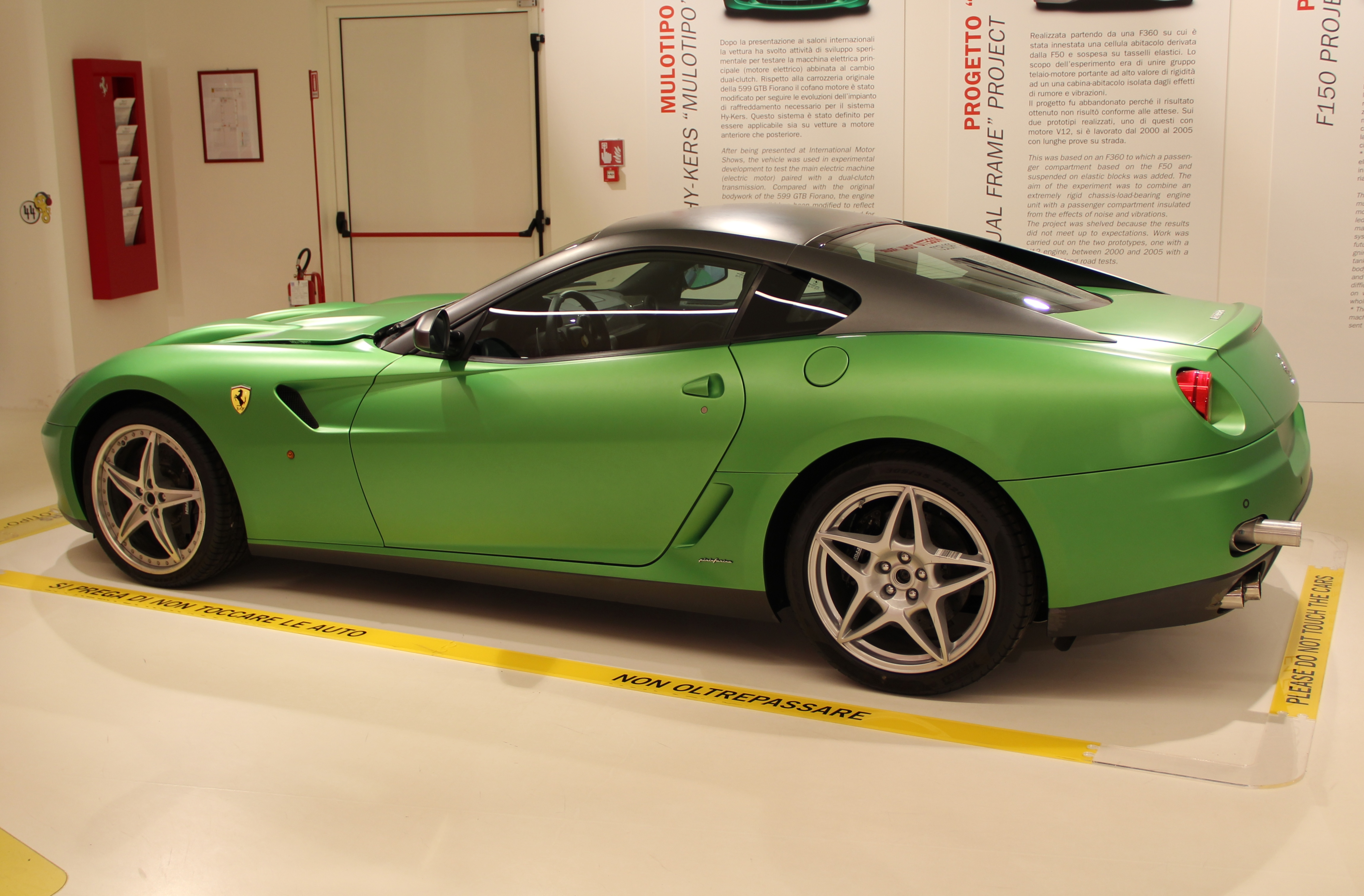
Ferrari 599 HY KERS

Motor Authority reported that Ferrari president Luca Cordero di Montezemolo was working on the development of a Ferrari model that would use alternative energy sources and which would be based on what Ferrari is doing in Formula 1, which uses Kinetic Energy Recovery System. The KERS was tested using a 599 as a test mule. The model was later revealed to be the LaFerrari.

== Awards ==
- Evo magazine named the 599 GTB as the Car of the Year for 2006.
- Top Gear Magazine also named the 599 GTB as the Supercar of the Year 2006.

== Successor ==
The successor to the 599 was announced on 29 February 2012, a few days prior to the Geneva Motor Show. Ferrari released a video featuring Fernando Alonso and Felipe Massa driving the car at Ferrari's own test track, the Pista di Fiorano. The car, named the F12berlinetta, was officially unveiled at the Geneva Motor Show on 6 March 2012.

== Sources ==
- "Maranello Masterpiece". AutoWeek. Archived from the original on September 29, 2007.
- "Maranello's New True GT". AutoWeek. Archived from the original on September 29, 2007.
- "Winner: Supercar". Top Gear. Archived from the original on 5 September 2010.
- "Ferrari 599 GTB Fiorano on test". Evo.
- "First Test: 2007 Ferrari 599 GTB Fiorano". Motor Trend.
- "Record of the Ferrari 599XX at the Nürburgring announced in Beijing". Ferrari.
- "Superamerica 45". Ferrari.
- "So how is Ferrari going to replace the 599?". Top Gear.
