= Jason Castriota =

American automobile designer

- Born: White Plains, New York, US
- Education: Art Center
- Occupations: Car designer, product designer
- Years active: 1997–present
- Employer(s): Gruppo Bertone, Pininfarina, Saab, Ford, Castriota Design Company
- Known for: Ferrari 599, Maserati GranTurismo, SSC Tuatara, Mustang Mach-E, Ferrari P4/5, Rolls-Royce Hyperion, Ferrari 612 Kappa
- Website: castriotadesign.com

Jason Castriota is an American automotive designer.

== Biography ==
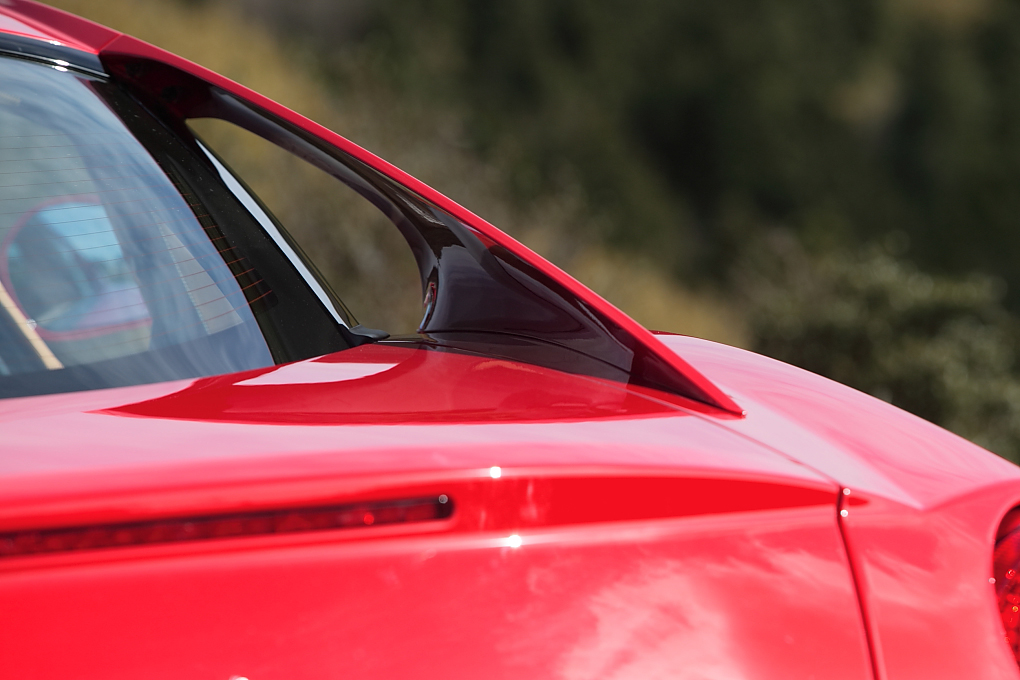
The C-pillar of the 599 was shaped like an arch to guide air to the rear section and help keep the car on the ground. It was initially a styling exercise.

Jason Castriota was born in White Plains, New York, and raised in Greenwich, Connecticut. He graduated from Emerson College in Boston and attended but dropped out of the Art Center College of Design in Pasadena. Castriota began his internship at the Pininfarina design studio, which later turned into full time position in design. Castriota had decided to stay in Turin and he took part in the design of production cars such as the Ferrari 599 GTB Fiorano and Maserati GranTurismo, concept cars like the Maserati Birdcage 75th with accepted and approved U.S. patents on the design and the Rolls-Royce Hyperion. As Head Designer he continued on for Special Projects, one-off exclusive cars for particular customers, such as the Ferrari P4/5 by Pininfarina, a restyled Enzo Ferrari for American car collector James Glickenhaus, and the Ferrari 612 Kappa, a restyling of the Ferrari 612 Scaglietti for car collector Peter Kalikow.

Castriota left his position at Pininfarina on the eve of the Paris Motor Show in September 2008, and was set to become design director at Stile Bertone. In 2009 he also formed his own design consultancy with offices in New York and Turin; Jason Castriota Design LLC.

In June 2010, Saab Automobile hired Castriota as its new design director. In 2014, Castriota joined Skylabs, a small product design firm in New York. In early 2016, he was recruited to work for Ford Motor Company as an Advanced Strategic Design leader in Dearborn, Michigan. Castriota moved into a strategy role on Ford's dedicated Electrified Vehicle team, Team Edison. Castriota was one of four directors who were responsible for the overall company's EV strategy and lead Ford's Battery Electric Global Brand Strategy. His latest project, the Mustang Mach-E is one of the fastest selling EVs on the market today.

Castriota is responsible for designing the SSC Tuatara a sports car. Tuatara entered production in 2020, and also set world speed records for the fastest production car on January 27, 2021, reaching a one-way speed of 286.1 mph (460.4 km/h) and a two-way average of 282.9 mph (455.3 km/h) in 2021. The SSC Tuatara reached a verified top speed of 295 mph.

== Designs ==
- Maserati Birdcage 75th (2005)
- Ferrari P4/5 by Pininfarina (2006)
- Ferrari 612 Kappa (2006)
- Ferrari 599 (2006)
- Maserati GranTurismo (2007)
- Rolls-Royce Hyperion (2008)
- Bertone Mantide (2009)
- Saab PhoeniX (2011)
- SSC Tuatara (2020)
- Ford Mustang Mach-E (2021)
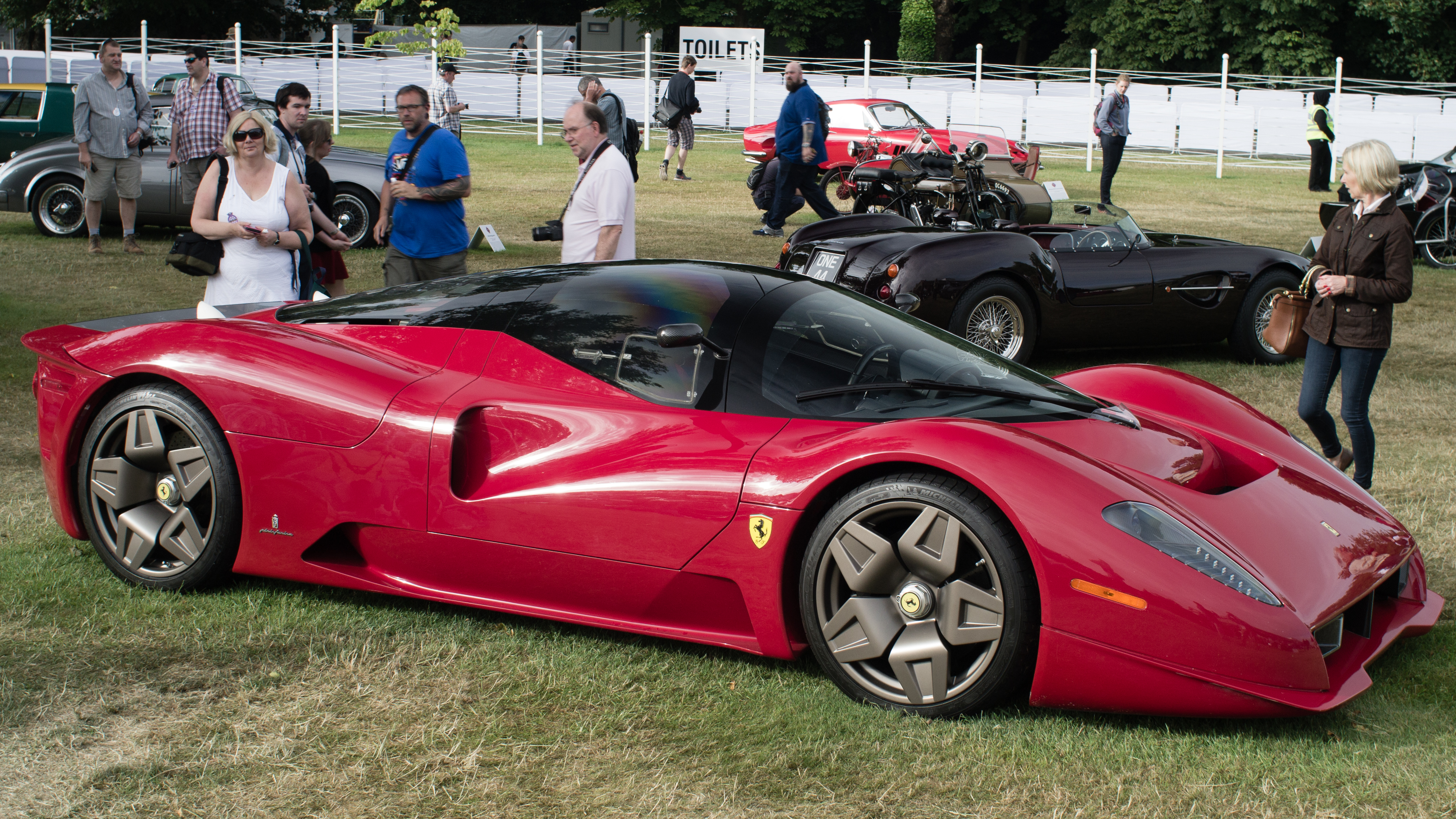
Ferrari P4/5 by Pininfarina

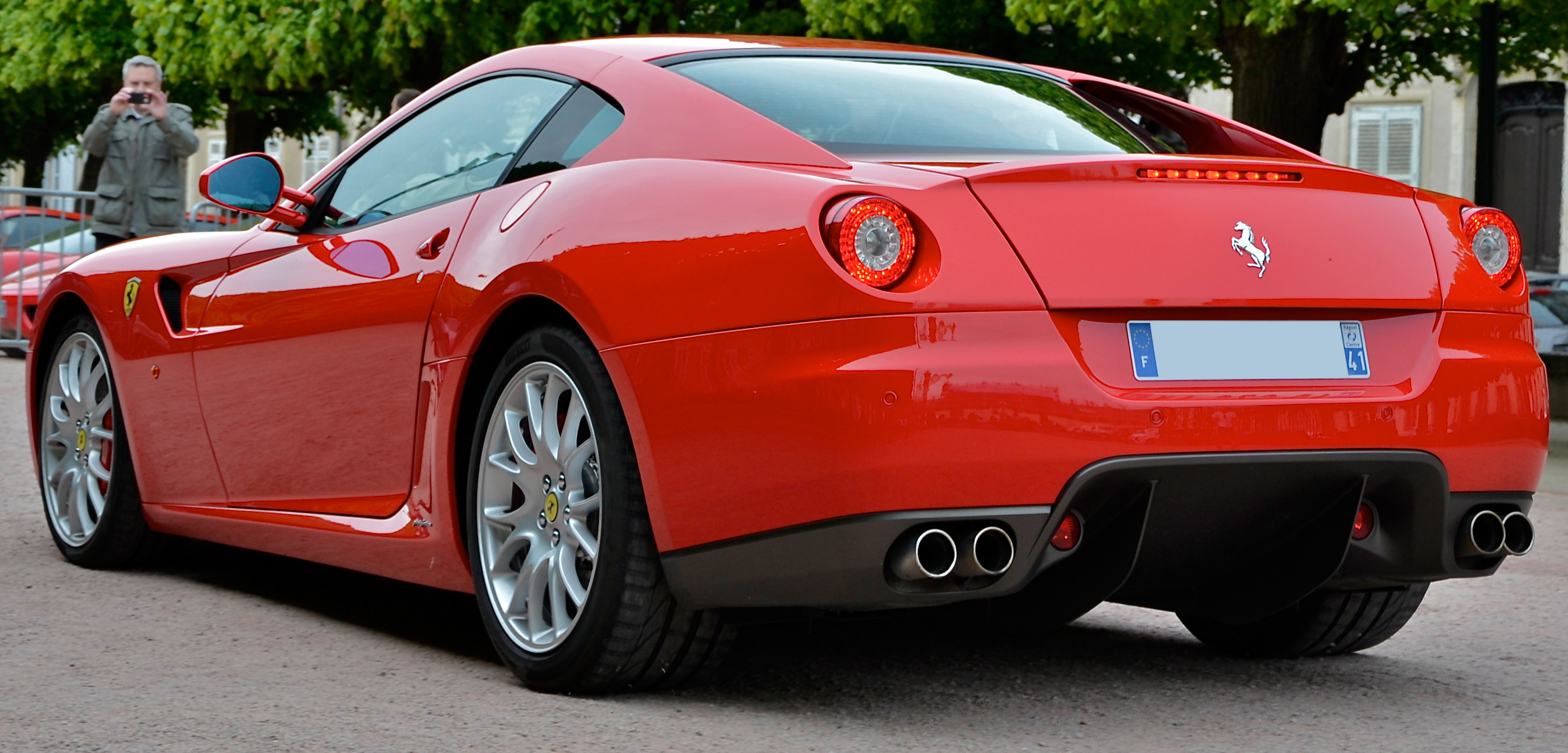
Ferrari 599 GTB Fiorano

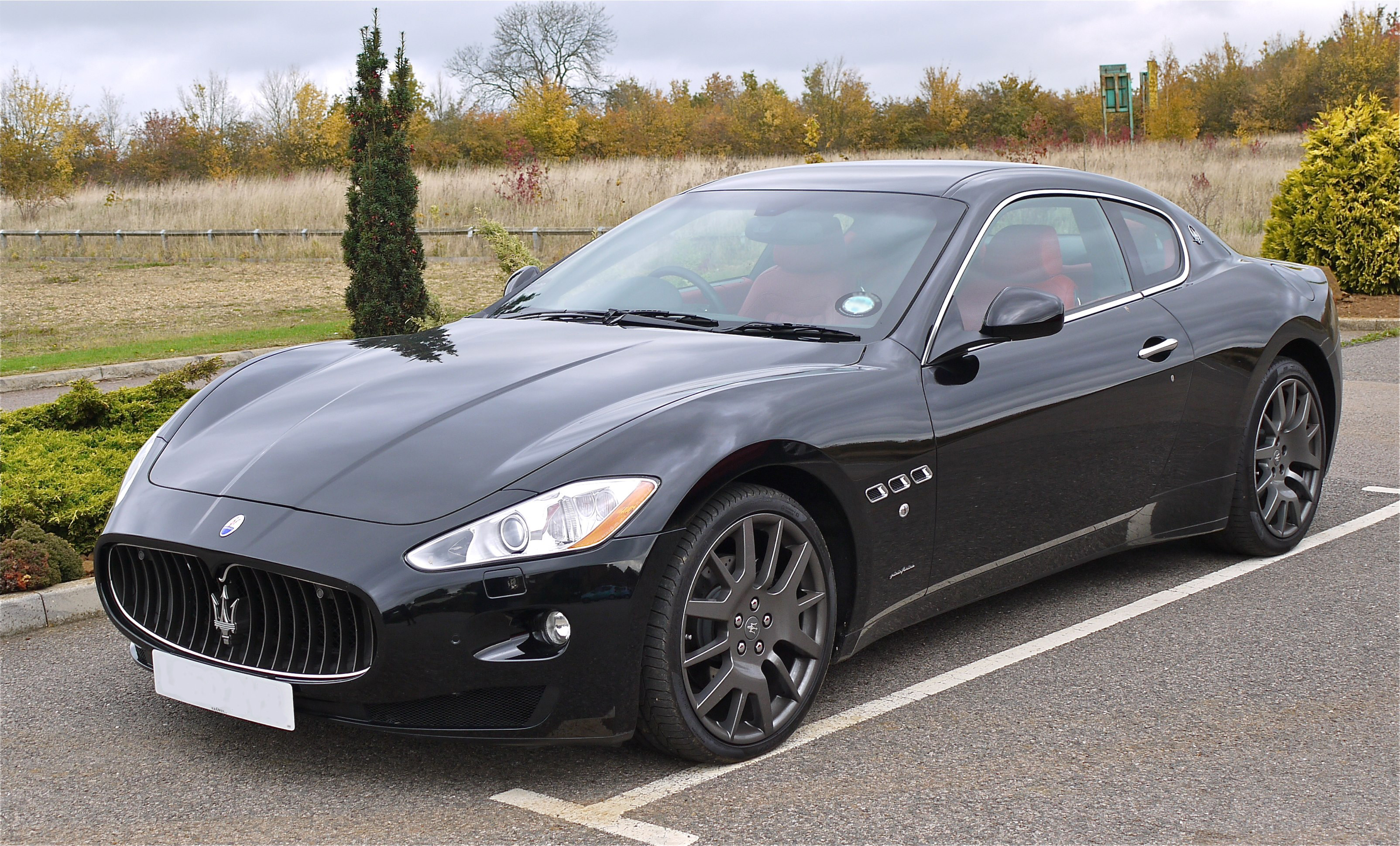
Maserati GranTurismo

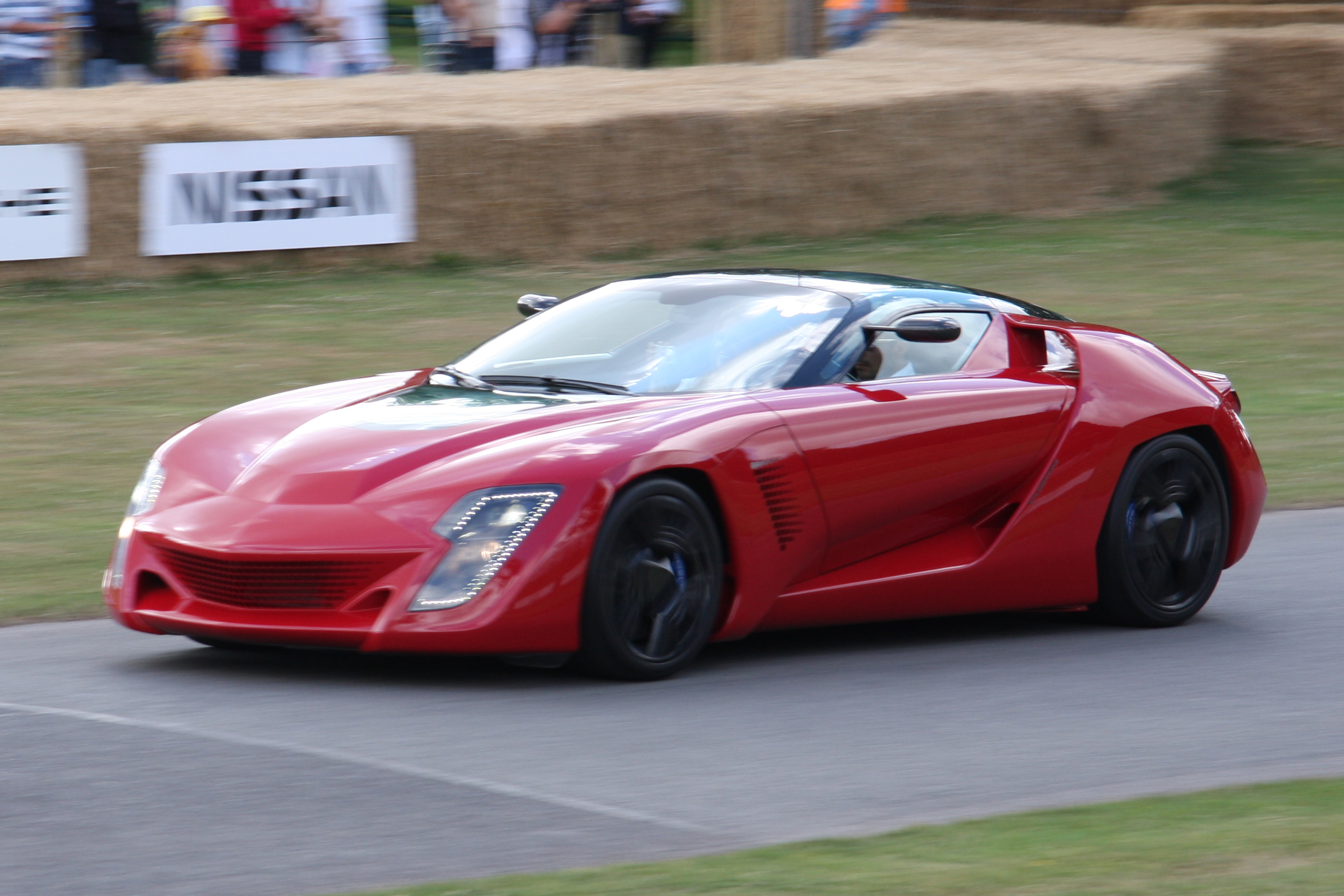
Bertone Mantide

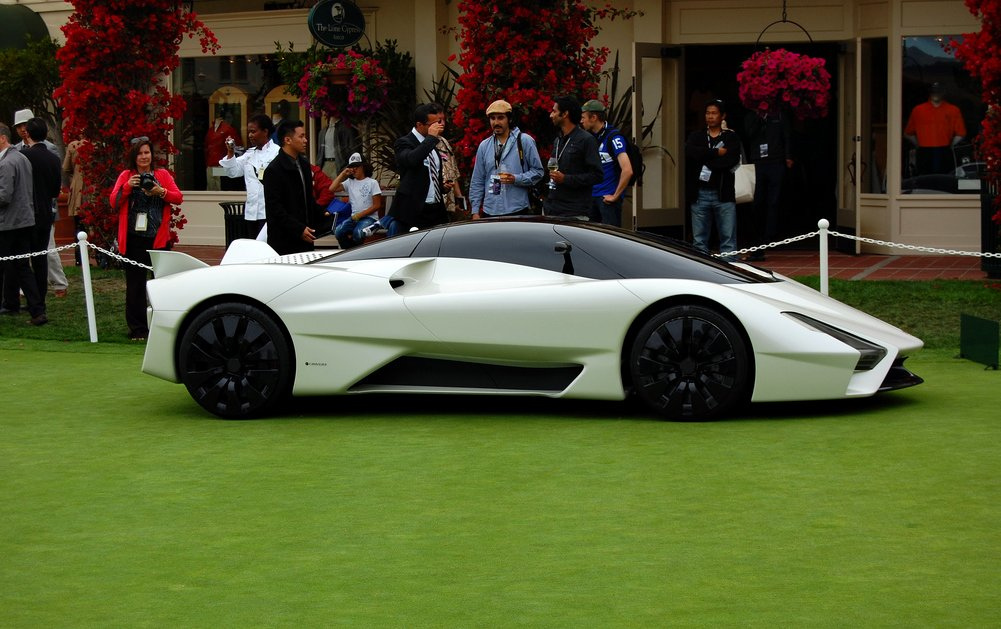
SSC Tuatara

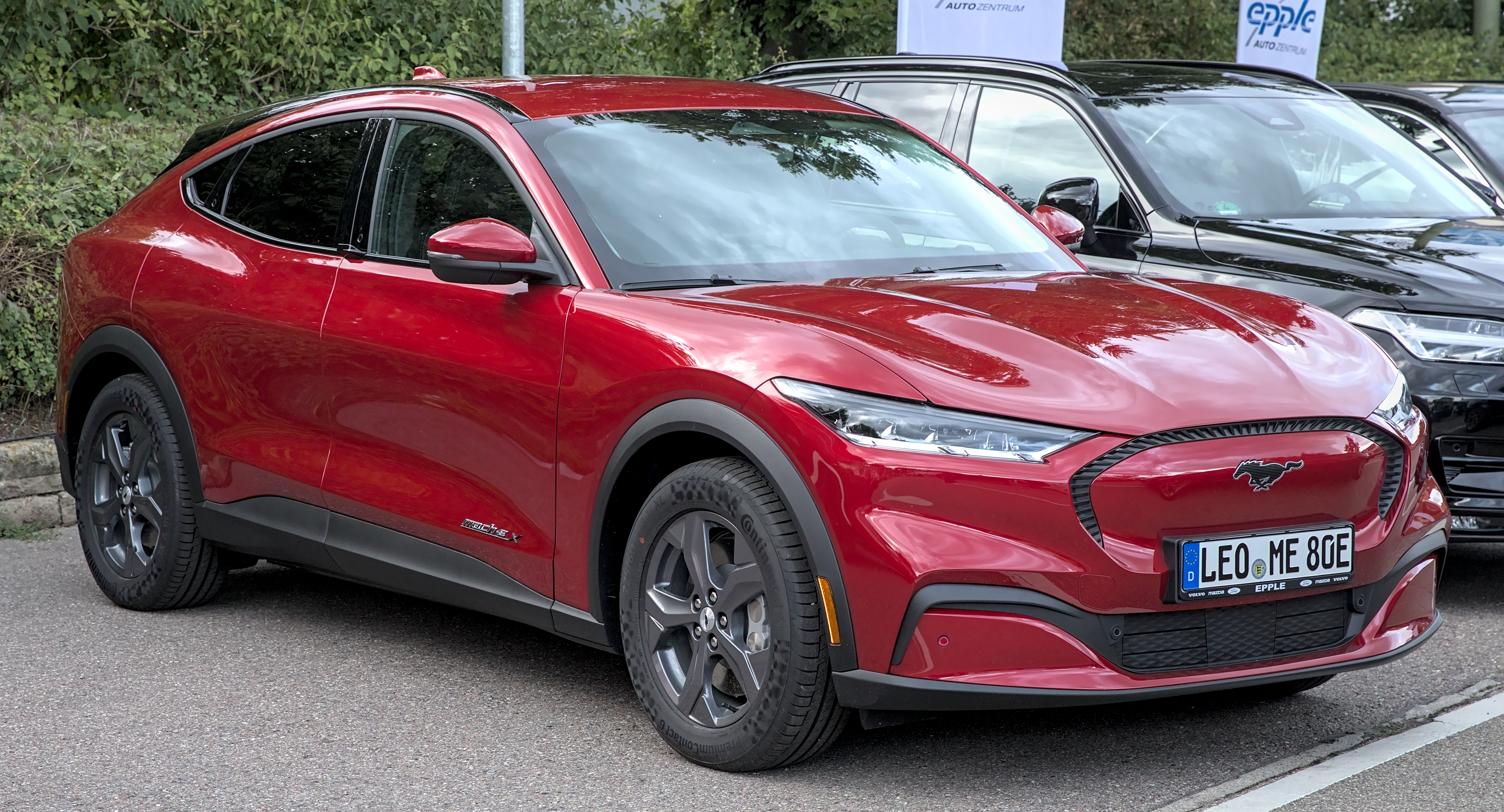
Ford Mustang Mach-E
