= Ferrari F12 =

Grand Tourer produced by Ferrari as the successor to the 599 GTB

Ferrari F12berlinetta
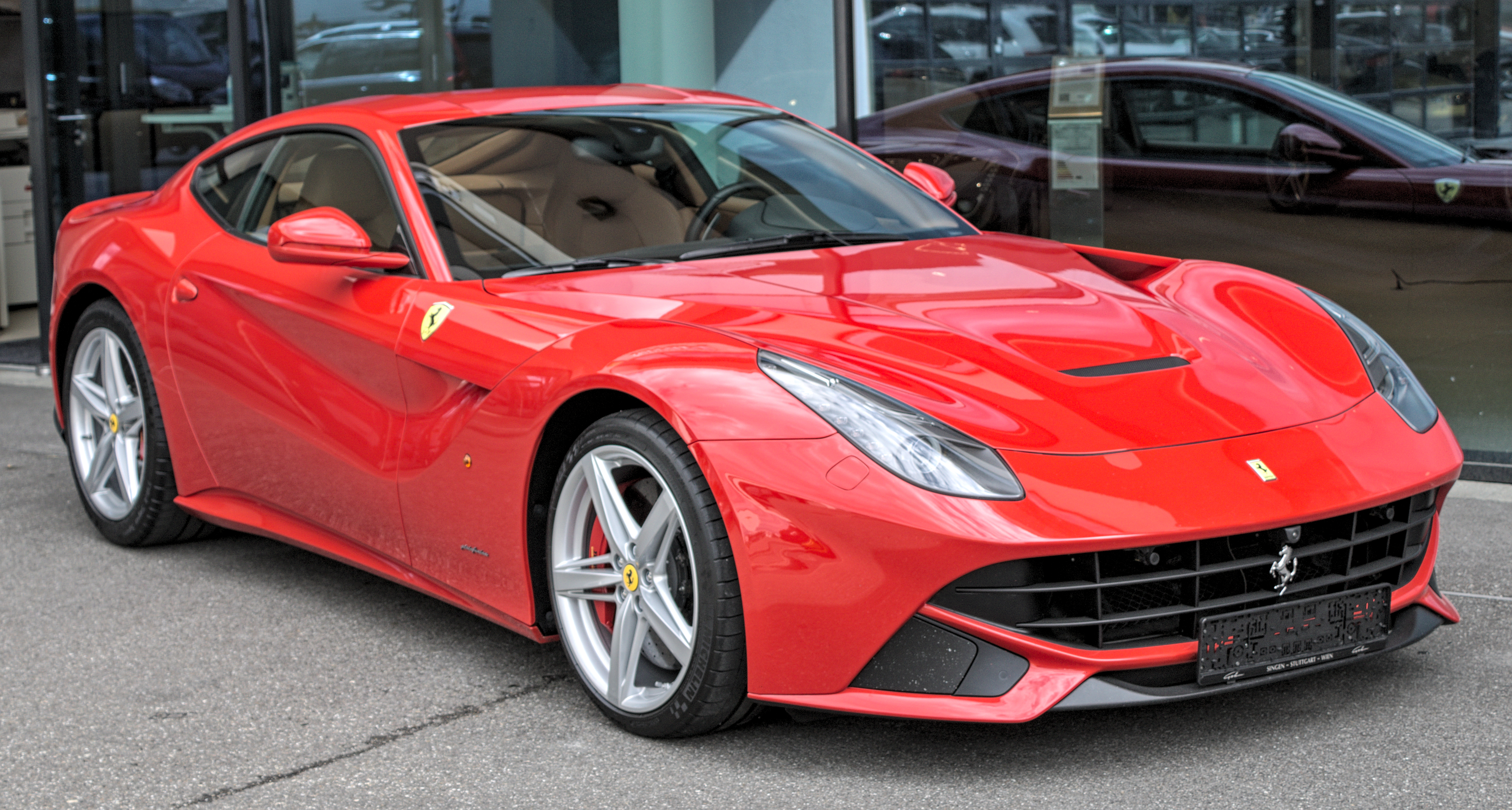

Overview
- Manufacturer: Ferrari
- Production: 2012–2017
- Assembly: Italy: Maranello
- Designer: Ferrari Styling Centre under the direction of Flavio Manzoni, in collaboration with Pininfarina

Body and chassis
- Class: Grand tourer (S)
- Body style: 2-door berlinetta
- Layout: Front mid-engine, rear-wheel-drive
- Related: Ferrari FF

Powertrain
- Engine: 6.3 L F140 FC/FG V12
- Power output: F12berlinetta: 740 PS (544 kW; 730 hp); F12tdf: 780 PS (574 kW; 769 hp)
- Transmission: 7-speed Magna 7DCL750 dual-clutch

Dimensions
- Wheelbase: 2,720 mm (107.1 in)
- Length: 4,618 mm (181.8 in) (F12berlinetta); 4,656 mm (183.3 in) (F12tdf)
- Width: 1,942 mm (76.5 in) (F12berlinetta); 1,961 mm (77.2 in) (F12tdf)
- Height: 1,273 mm (50.1 in)
- Kerb weight: 1,520 kg (3,351 lb) (F12tdf); 1,630 kg (3,594 lb) (F12berlinetta)

Chronology
- Predecessor: Ferrari 599
- Successor: Ferrari 812 Superfast

The Ferrari F12berlinetta (Type F152) is a front mid-engine, rear-wheel-drive grand tourer produced by Italian automobile manufacturer Ferrari. The F12berlinetta debuted at the 2012 Geneva Motor Show, and replaced the 599 grand tourer. The naturally aspirated 6.3 litre Ferrari V12 engine used in the F12berlinetta won the 2013 International Engine of the Year Award in the Best Performance category and Best Engine above 4.0 litres. The F12berlinetta was named "The Supercar of the Year 2012" by car magazine Top Gear. The F12berlinetta was replaced by the 812 Superfast in early 2017.

In 2014, the F12berlinetta was awarded the XXIII Premio Compasso d'Oro ADI. Accepting the award was Ferrari's Senior Vice President of Design, Flavio Manzoni.

== Specifications ==
=== Engine ===
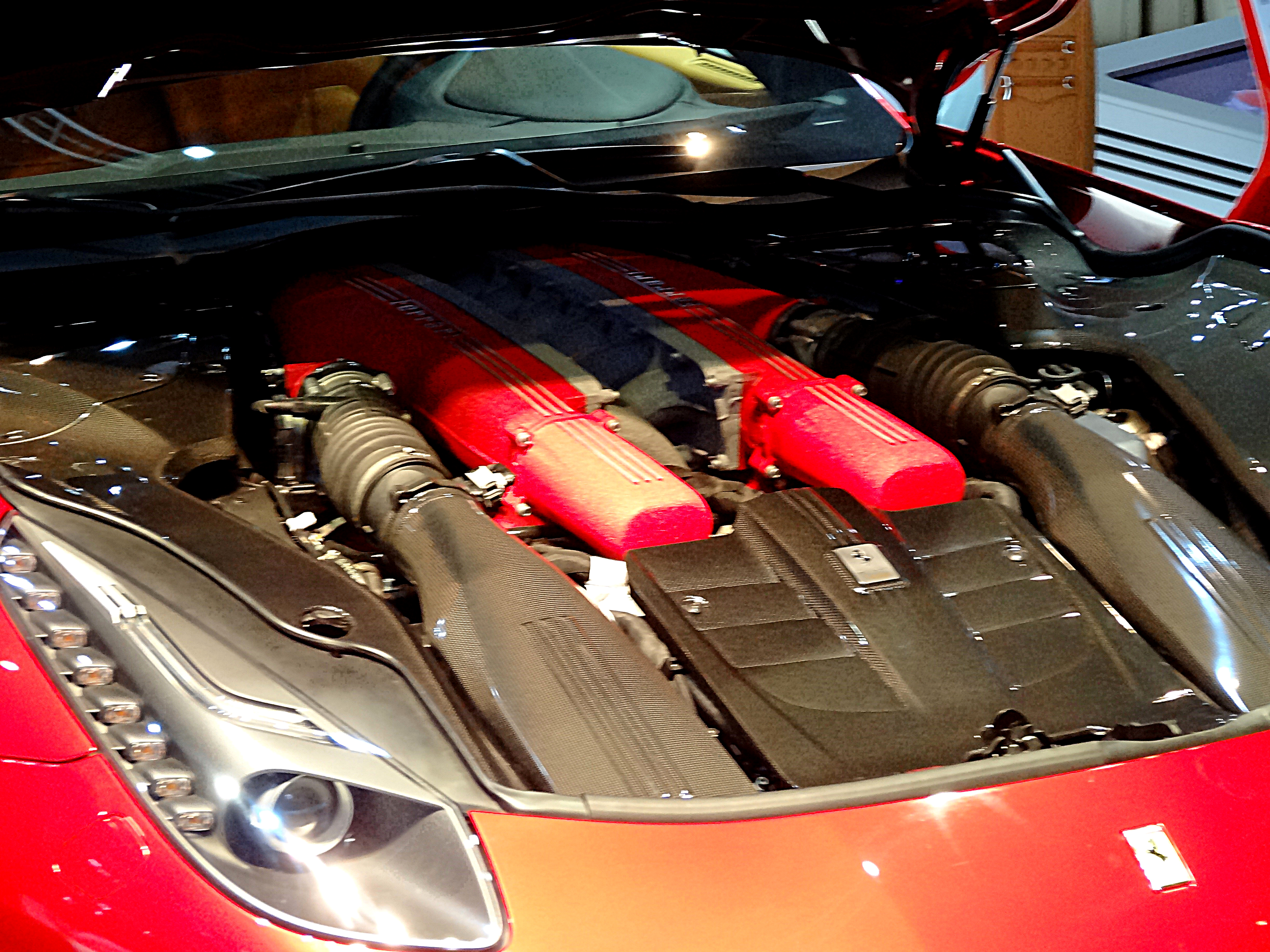
The 6.3 L F140FC V12 engine

The F12berlinetta uses a 6,262 cc (6.3 L; 382.1 cu in), naturally aspirated 65° V12 engine of the Ferrari F140 engine family. Displacement is shared with the FF, but the F140 FC version installed on the F12 generates a power output of 740 PS (544 kW; 730 hp) at 8,250 rpm and 690 N⋅m (509 lb⋅ft) of torque at 6,000 rpm, making it the most powerful Ferrari road car ever when it was launched.

The engine in the F12berlinetta has been designed to be more efficient than that of the 599, as well as more powerful. The engine management system is fitted with Ferrari's HELE start-stop system to reduce fuel consumption when idling. Ferrari reports that the F12berlinetta can achieve 18 mpg_{‑imp} (15.7 L/100 km; 15.0 mpg_{‑US}) – a 30% improvement over the 599 – and produces CO_{2} emissions of 350 g/km.

=== Transmission ===
Similar to the California, 458 Italia, FF and LaFerrari, the F12berlinetta transmits power through a 7-speed dual-clutch automatic gearbox operated by the driver using paddle shifters present behind the steering wheel. Compared to similar models, the F12berlinetta uses shortened gear ratios to match the power of the engine.

=== Chassis ===
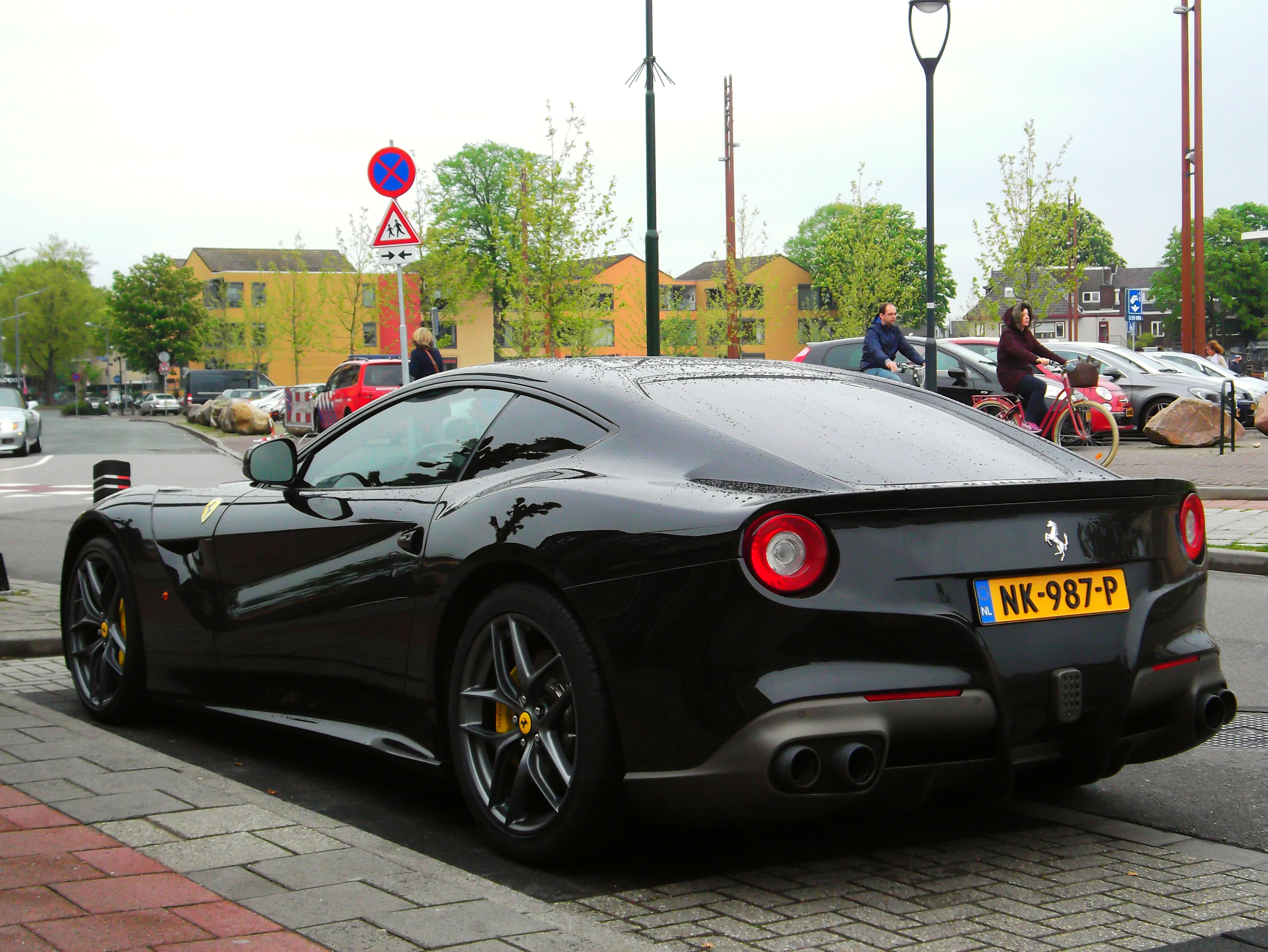
Rear view

The F12berlinetta is built around an aluminium space frame chassis co-developed with Scaglietti. The chassis is made up of 12 different aluminium alloys and improves structural rigidity by 20% over the 599, whilst reducing weight by 70 kg (154 lb). The centre of gravity has also been lowered by around 25 mm (1 in). The F12berlinetta's weight distribution is 48% front, 52% rear.

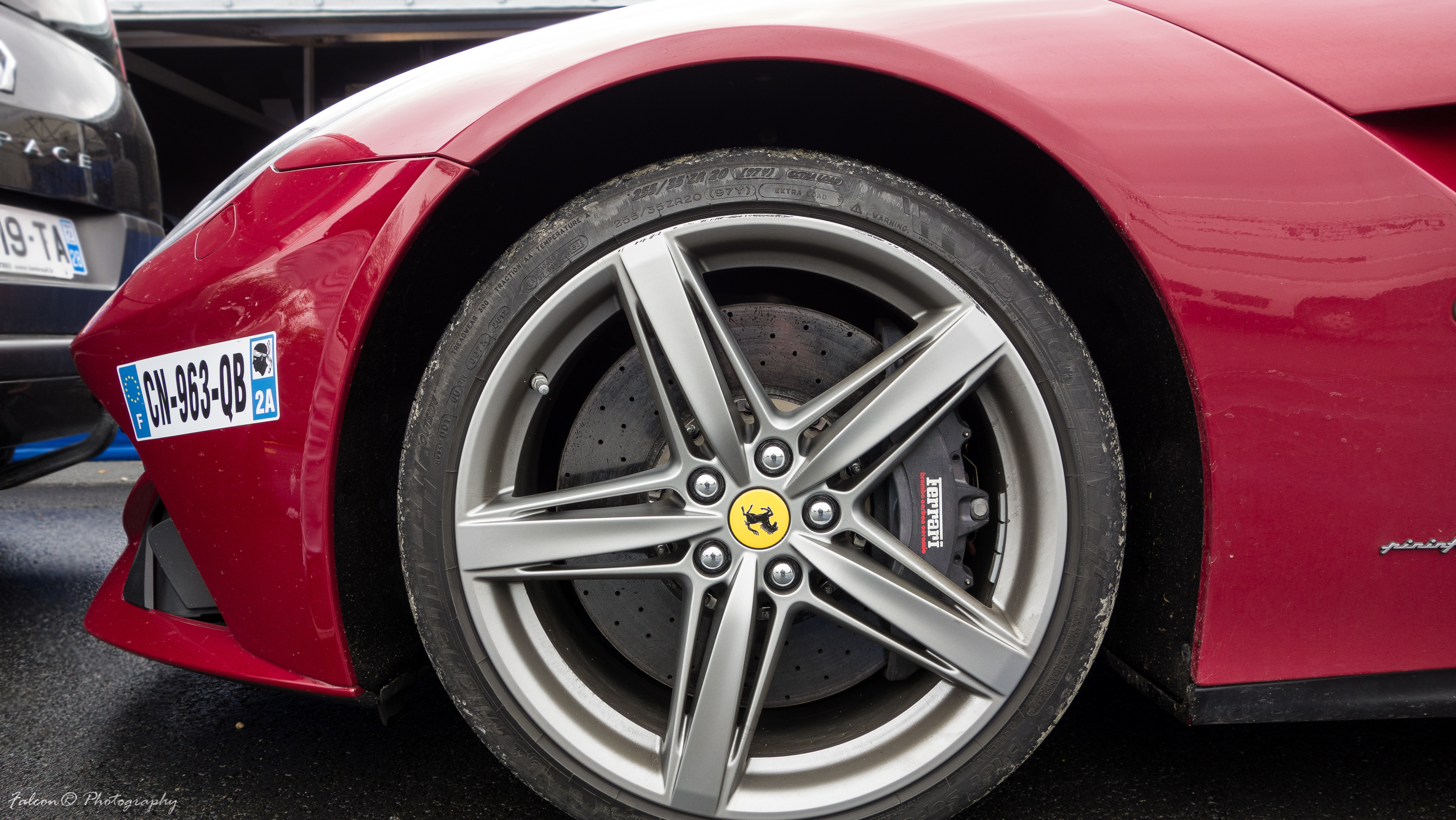
The F12berlinetta has carbon ceramic brakes as standard equipment.

Similar to other contemporary Ferrari models, the F12berlinetta uses Ferrari's third generation CCM3 carbon ceramic disc brakes with ABS, SCM-E magnetorheological suspension, an electronic limited-slip differential, ESP Premium stability control and F1-Trac traction control system. The car's stability and traction control, suspension and other settings are controlled by the Manettino dial mounted on the steering wheel.

=== Tires ===
The F12berlinetta is fitted with Michelin Pilot Super Sport tyres, with the tyre codes 255/35 ZR20 (on 20"×9.5J wheels) at the front and 315/35 ZR20 (on 20"×11.5J wheels) at the rear.

=== Aerodynamics ===
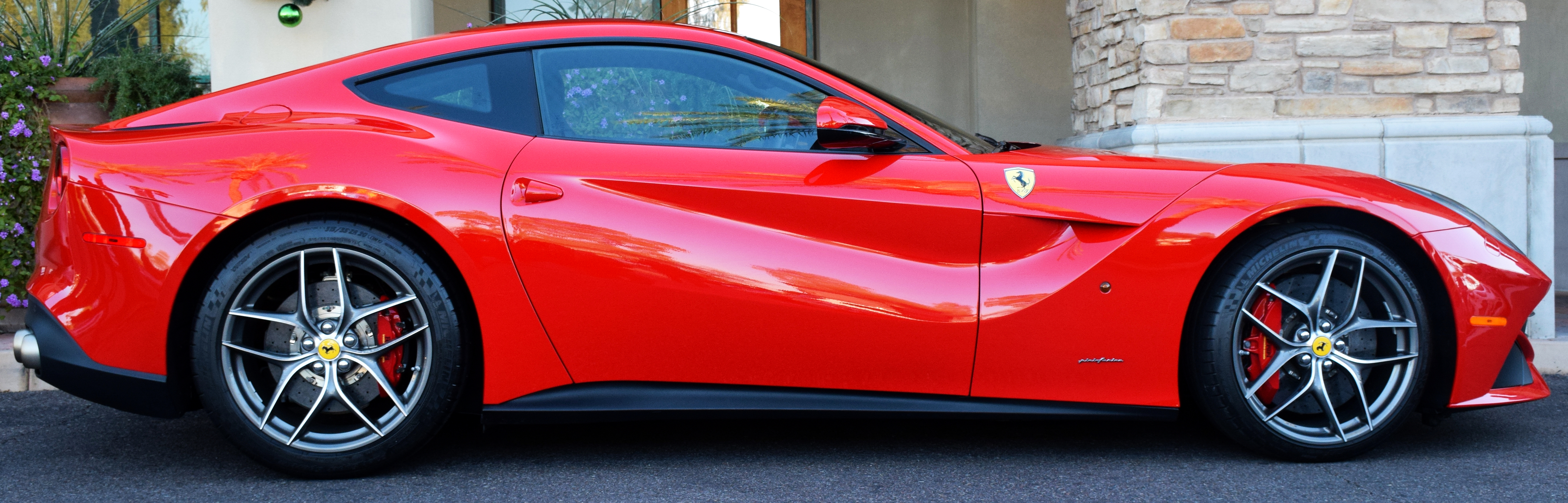
The F12berlinetta in side view

The F12berlinetta makes use of aerodynamic techniques based on Ferrari's 599XX and Formula One programmes, developed with wind tunnel and CFD testing. A notable feature is the Aero Bridge, an air channel running from the bonnet, through the flanks and along the sides of the vehicle, creating an effect that increases downforce. Another feature is Active Brake Cooling ducts, which open to direct cooling air only when the brakes are hot, keeping them closed at other times to reduce aerodynamic drag. The F12berlinetta produces 123 kg (271 lb) of downforce at 200 km/h (124 mph) – an increase of 76% over the 599 GTB – and has a drag coefficient of 0.299.

=== Performance ===
Ferrari reports that the F12berlinetta is capable of lapping the Fiorano test circuit in 1 minute, 23 seconds; three seconds slower than the LaFerrari, a full second faster than the 599 GTO, two seconds faster than the Enzo Ferrari, two seconds faster than the 458 Italia, three seconds faster than the 430 Scuderia and three and a half seconds faster than the 599 GTB.

Ferrari claims acceleration times for the F12berlinetta of 0 to 100 km/h (62 mph) in 3.1 seconds, 0 to 200 km/h (124 mph) in 8.5 seconds and a top speed of 340 km/h (211 mph).

== Design ==
The body of the F12berlinetta is designed by the Ferrari Styling Centre and Pininfarina, and shares some styling elements with other recent Ferrari models. This includes a front grille similar to the FF and headlights shared with the FF and 458 Italia. The interior, based on the FF, features new "Frau leather" upholstery with aluminium, Alutex, and carbon fibre trim, and has increased luggage space compared to the 599.

The body computer system is developed by Magneti Marelli Automotive Lighting.

== F12tdf (2015–2017) ==
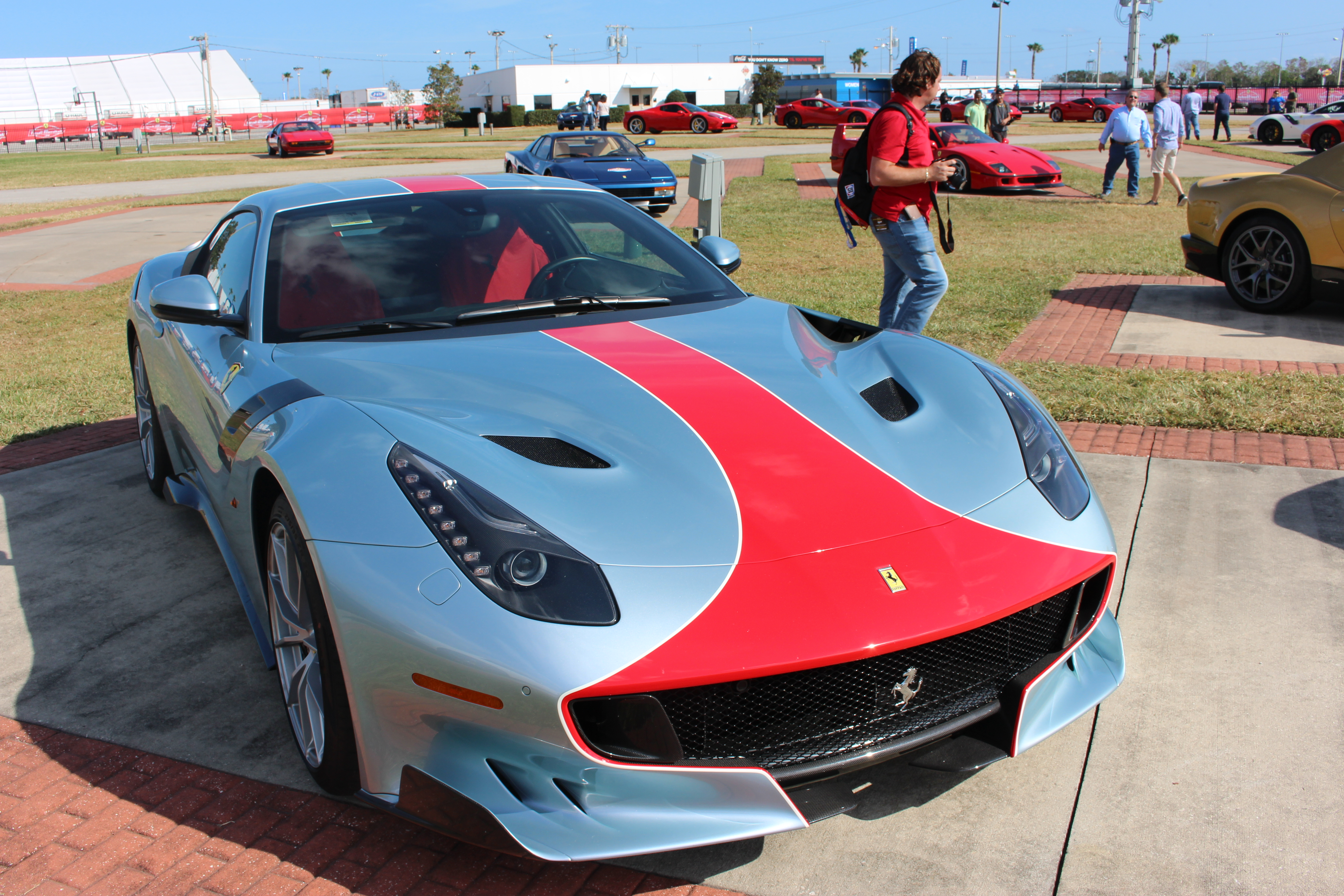

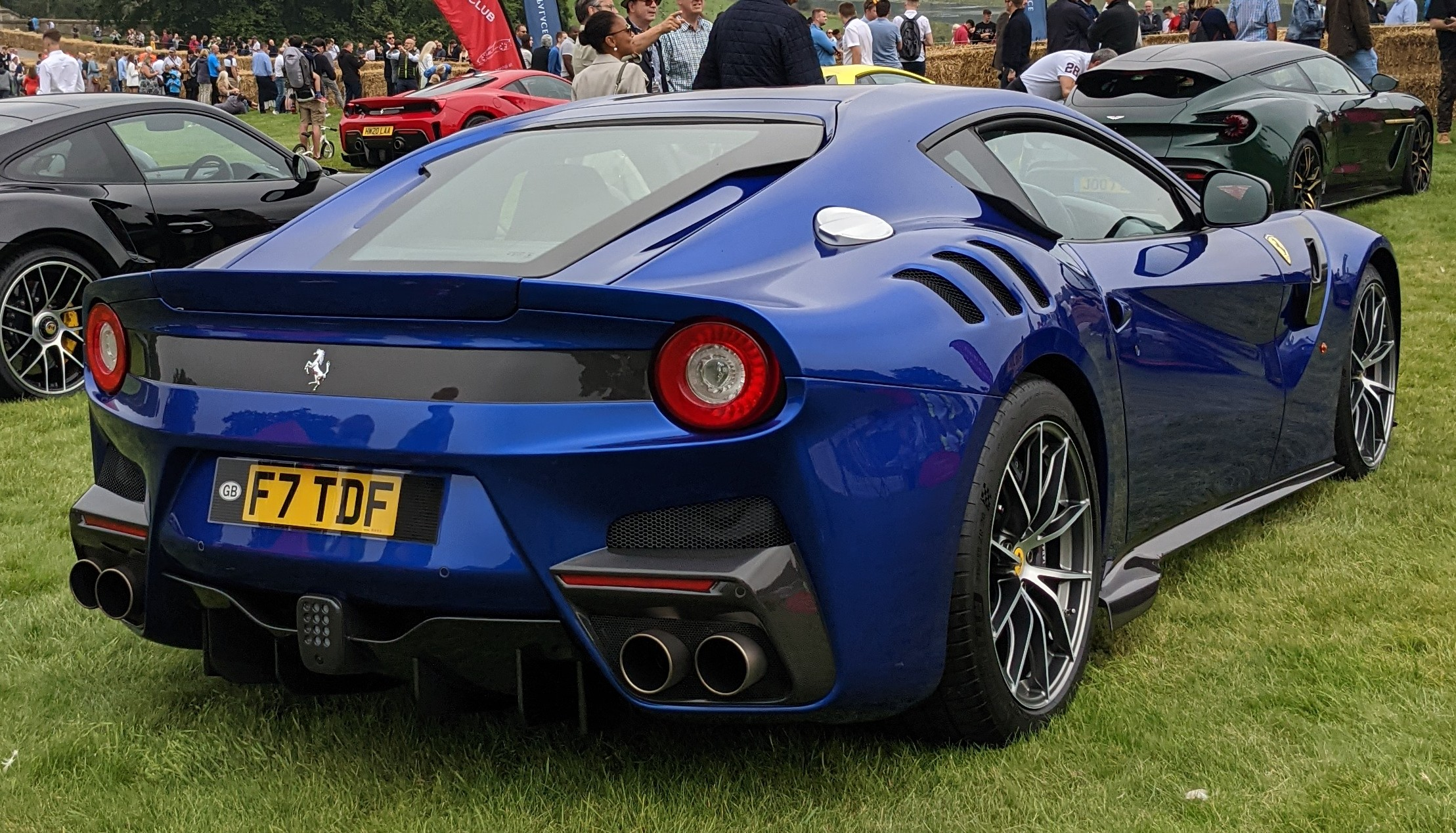
Ferrari F12tdf

The Ferrari F12tdf (tour de France) is a track-focused version of the F12berlinetta unveiled in October 2015. The name pays homage to the Tour de France automobile race held between 1899 and 1986 and which was regularly won by the Ferrari 250 between 1956 and 1964. The F12tdf shares the same 6.3 litre V12 engine with the F12berlinetta, but with power output increased to 780 PS (574 kW; 769 hp) at 8500 rpm and 705 N⋅m (520 lb⋅ft) of torque at 6750 rpm. The F12tdf is 110 kg (243 lb) lighter than the F12, having a claimed dry weight of 1,415 kg (3,120 lb) and kerb weight of 1,520 kg (3,351 lb). Ferrari claims an acceleration time for the F12tdf of 0 to 100 km/h (62 mph) in 2.9 seconds and 0 to 200 km/h (124 mph) in 7.9 seconds. The top speed was claimed to be 'in excess of 340 km/h (211 mph)'. The car has recorded a 1-minute 21 seconds lap time on Ferrari's Fiorano test circuit, 2 seconds faster than the standard F12berlinetta and 488 GTB, and just 1.3 seconds behind the fastest lap set by the LaFerrari. F12tdf was designed by Ferrari Styling Centre. Production of the F12tdf was limited to 799 units.

== One-offs and special editions ==
=== F12 TRS ===
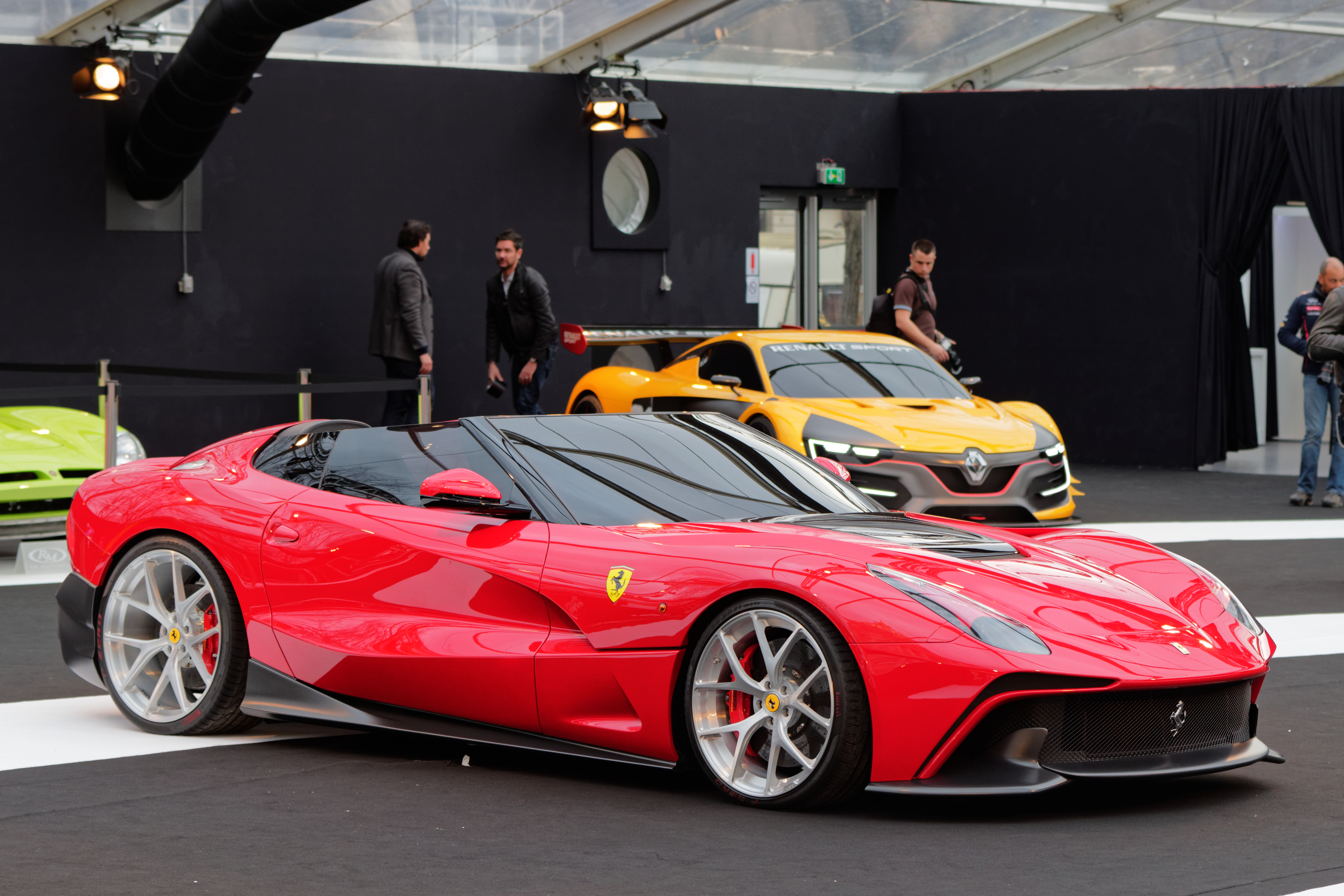
F12 TRS at the 2015 Festival automobile international

The Ferrari F12 TRS is a barchetta based on the F12berlinetta, made for a customer by Ferrari under its Special Projects programme. It made its public debut in Sicily at the Ferrari Cavalcade in June 2014. Designed in-house by the Centro Stile Ferrari headed by Flavio Manzoni, it took inspiration from the 1957 250 Testa Rossa, reinterpreted in a modern design language. The car has a Barchetta bodystyle, harking back to the original Testarossa. A redesigned rear section also recalls the styling of the Testarossa in a modern fashion. The front of the car features a redesigned front bumper and a new engine cover with a glass panel displaying the V12 engine's cylinder heads. The F12 TRS also made an appearance at the 2014 Goodwood Festival of Speed.

In November 2014, a second F12 TRS was spotted testing at Circuito Monteblanco in Spain, painted in black, while the red version was displayed again in January 2015 at the Festival Automobile International in Paris.

The black F12 TRS was seen again, this time in Rome at the Ferrari Cavalcade in June 2015, now finished in liquid silver paintwork and featuring a redesigned front bumper, headlights, mirrors and rear diffuser.

The red F12 TRS was spotted again in Corsica in 2016 now featuring the same redesigned body as the liquid silver version. Only two of these cars were produced and both were commissioned by the same customer.

F12 TRS details

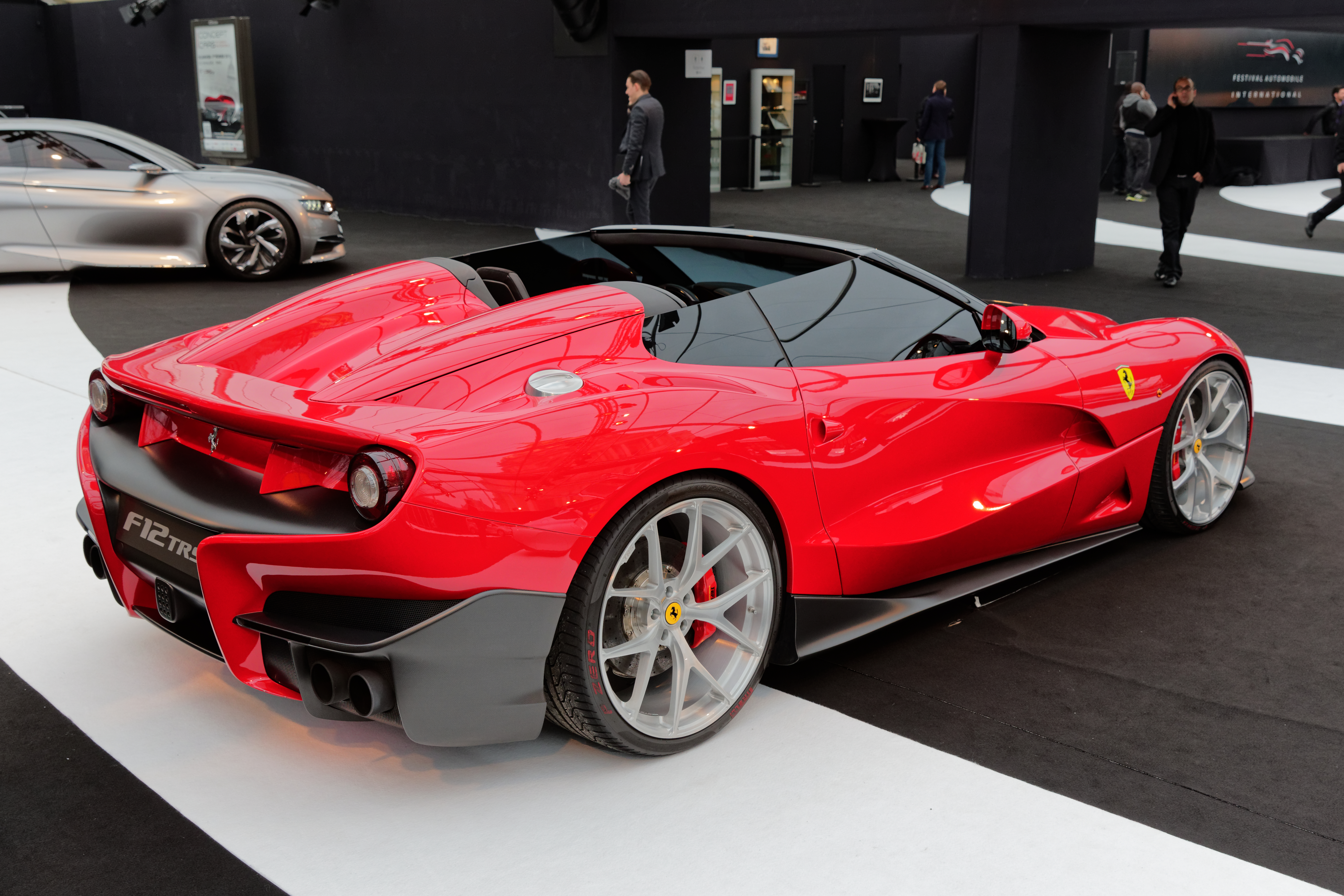

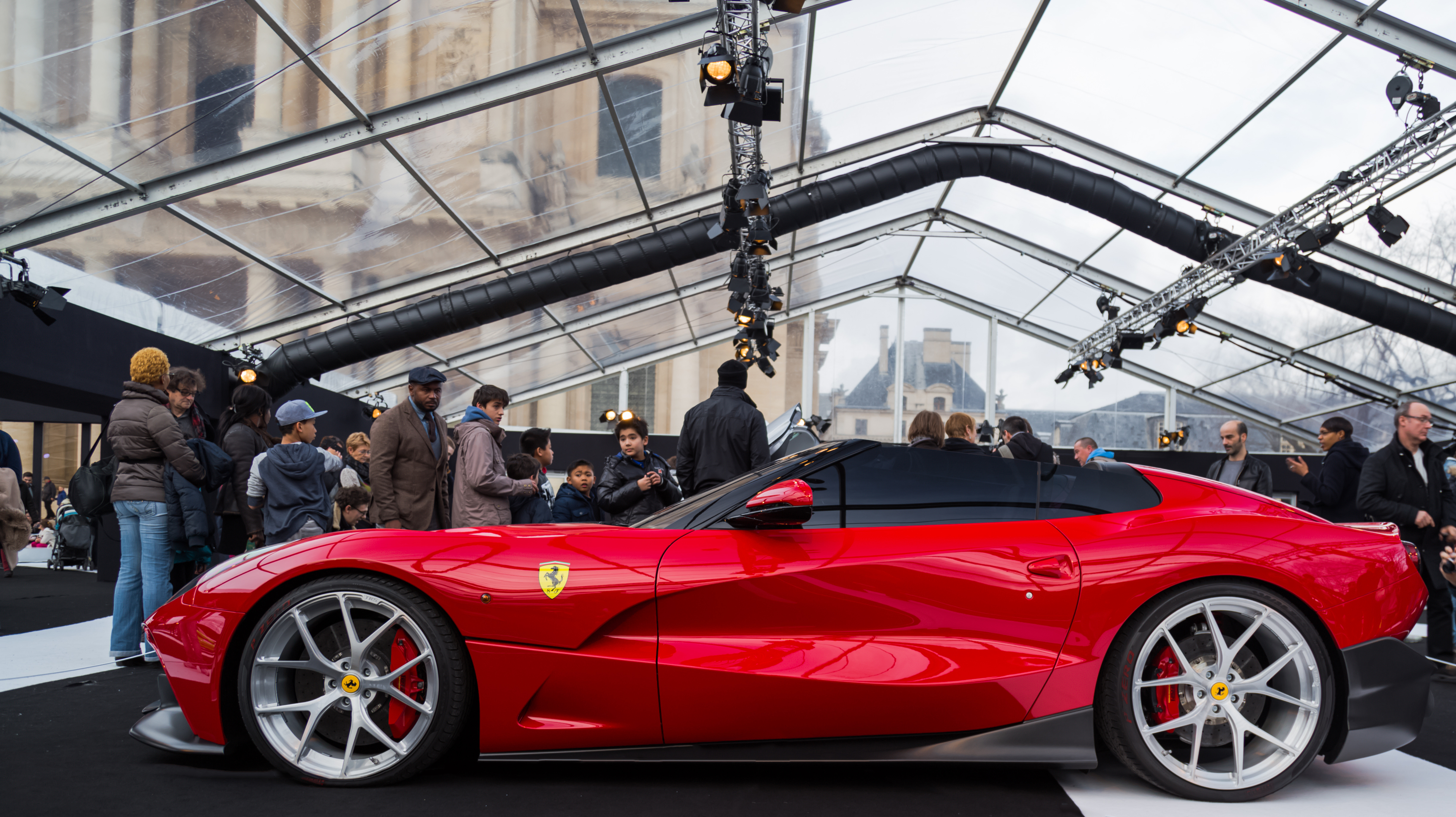

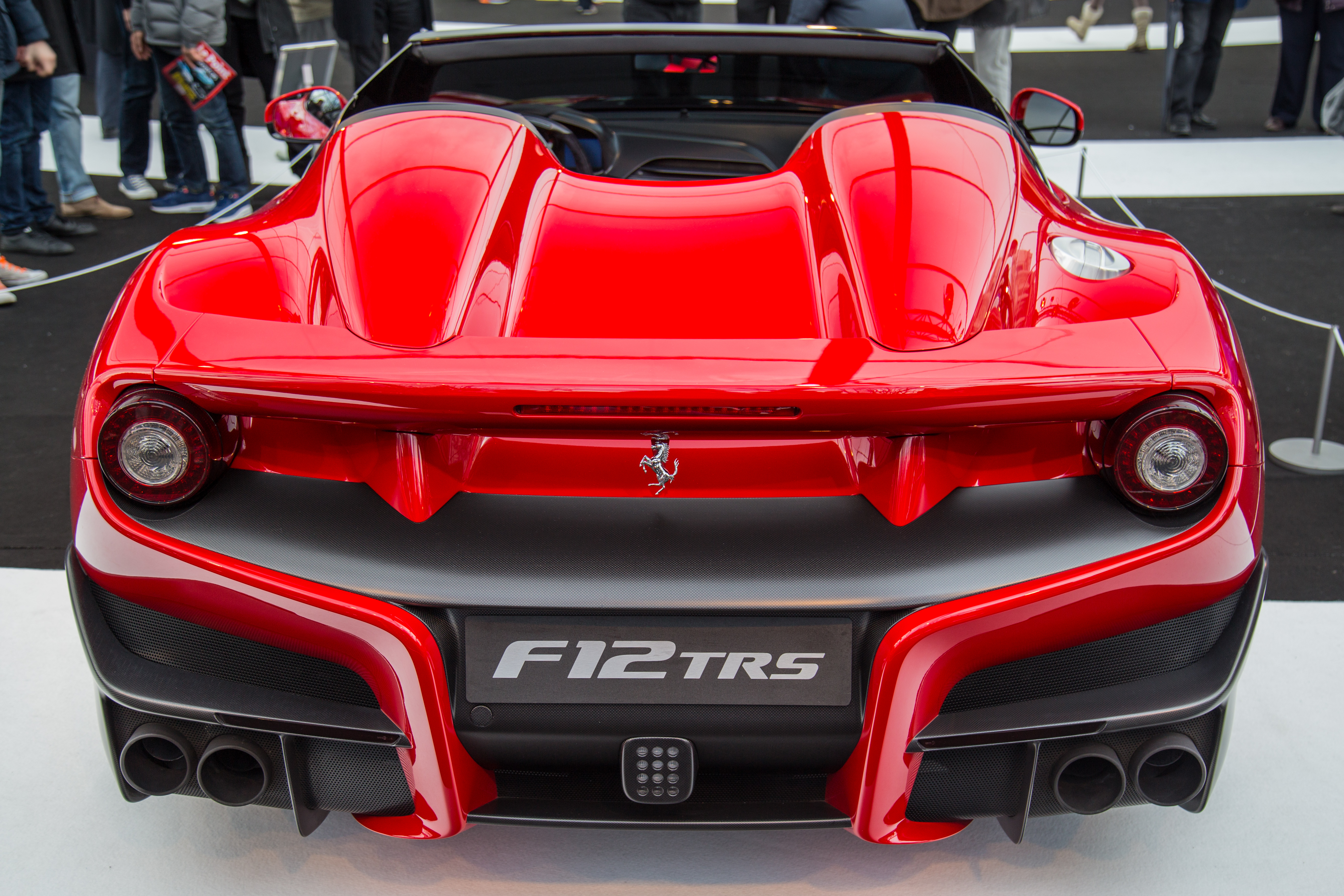

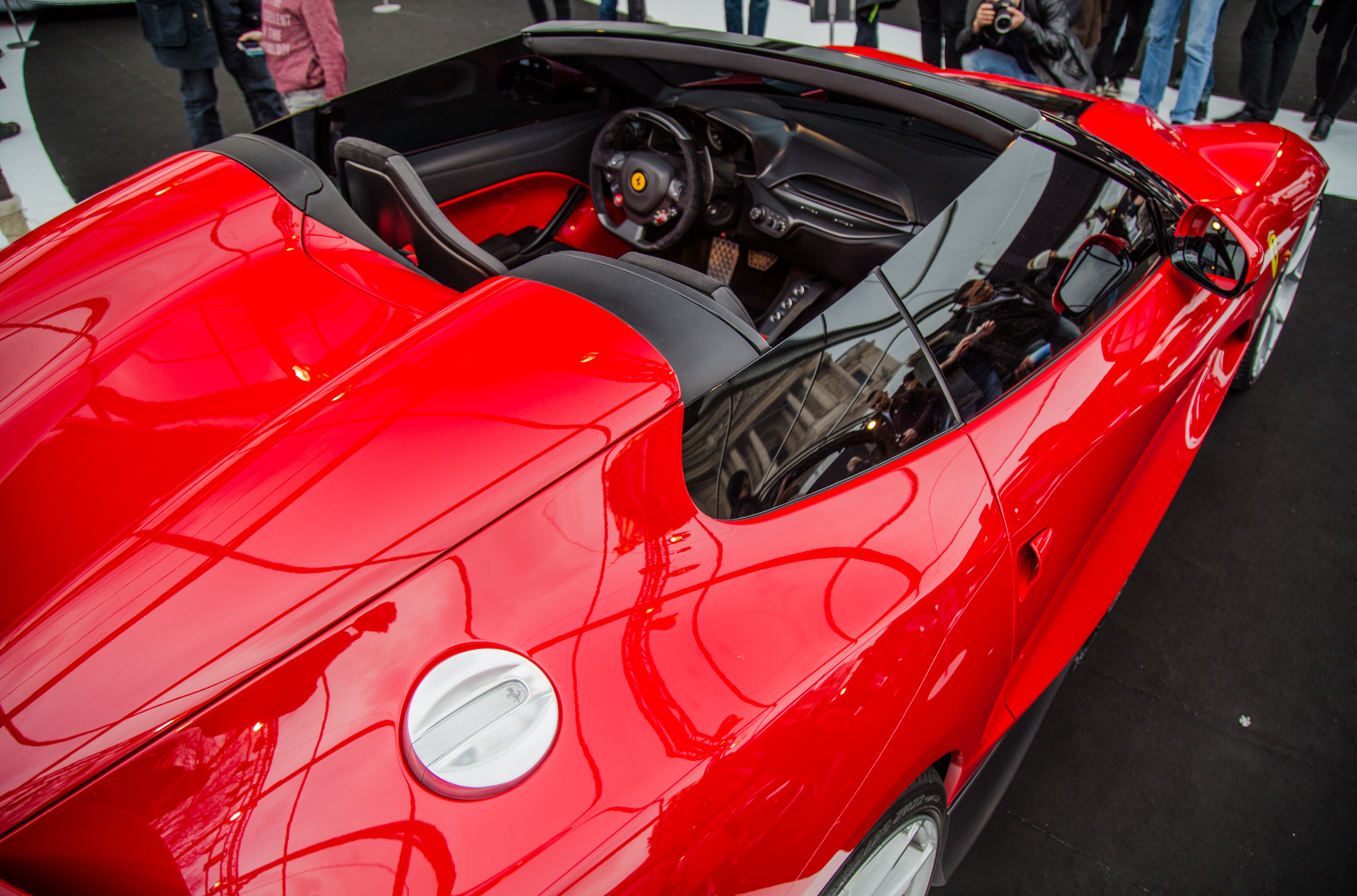

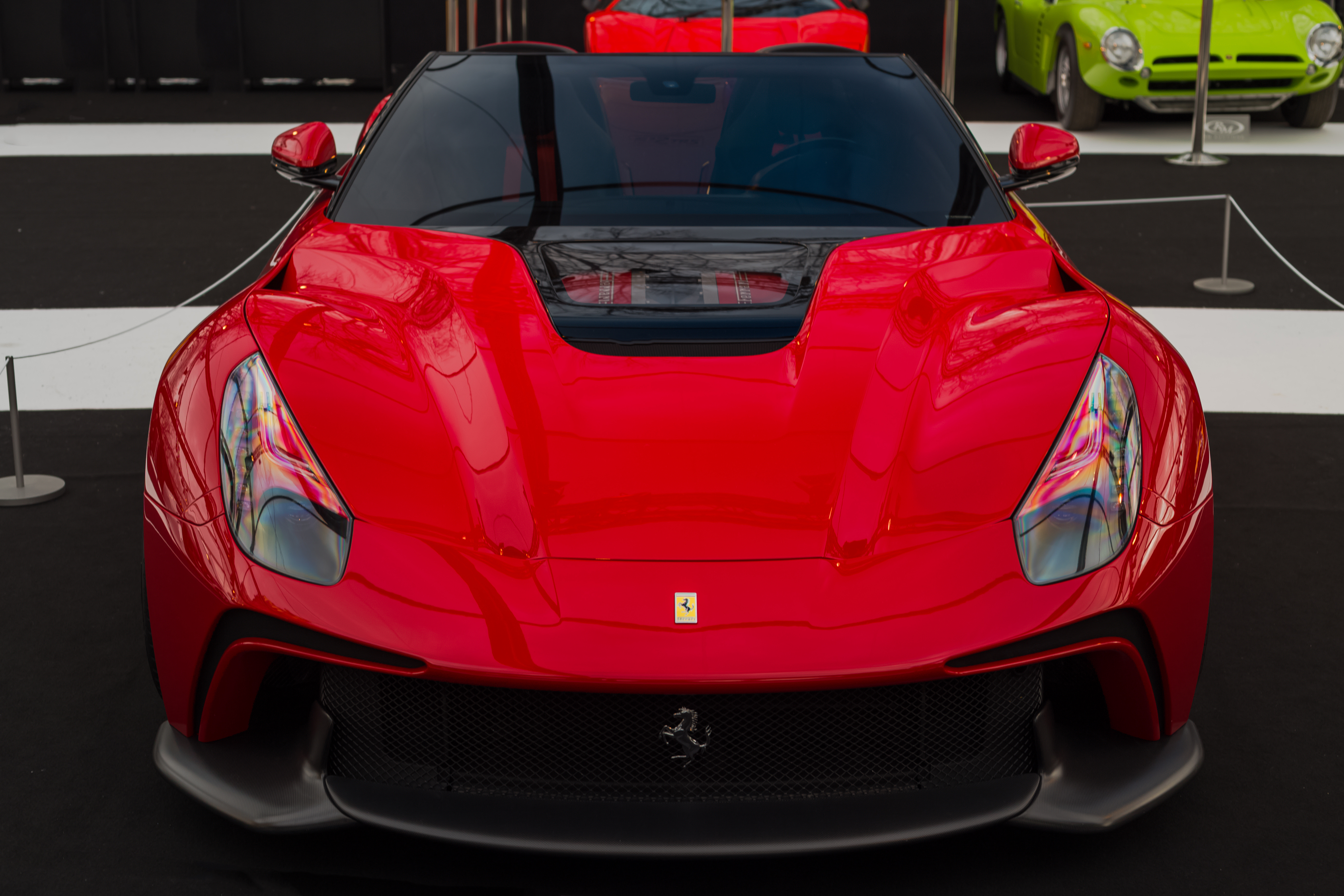

=== SP America ===
The Ferrari SP America is a one-off coupé based on the F12berlinetta completed in 2014 and developed under Ferrari's Special Projects programme with Pininfarina. It features custom bodywork, including a redesigned hood with three vents, which many reviewers say is reminiscent of the 250 GTO. It also has unique vents on the fenders and slats behind the windows, as well as a redesigned front bumper and redesigned rear end with a large diffuser and an integrated spoiler. The car was commissioned by Danny Wegman, CEO of Wegmans.

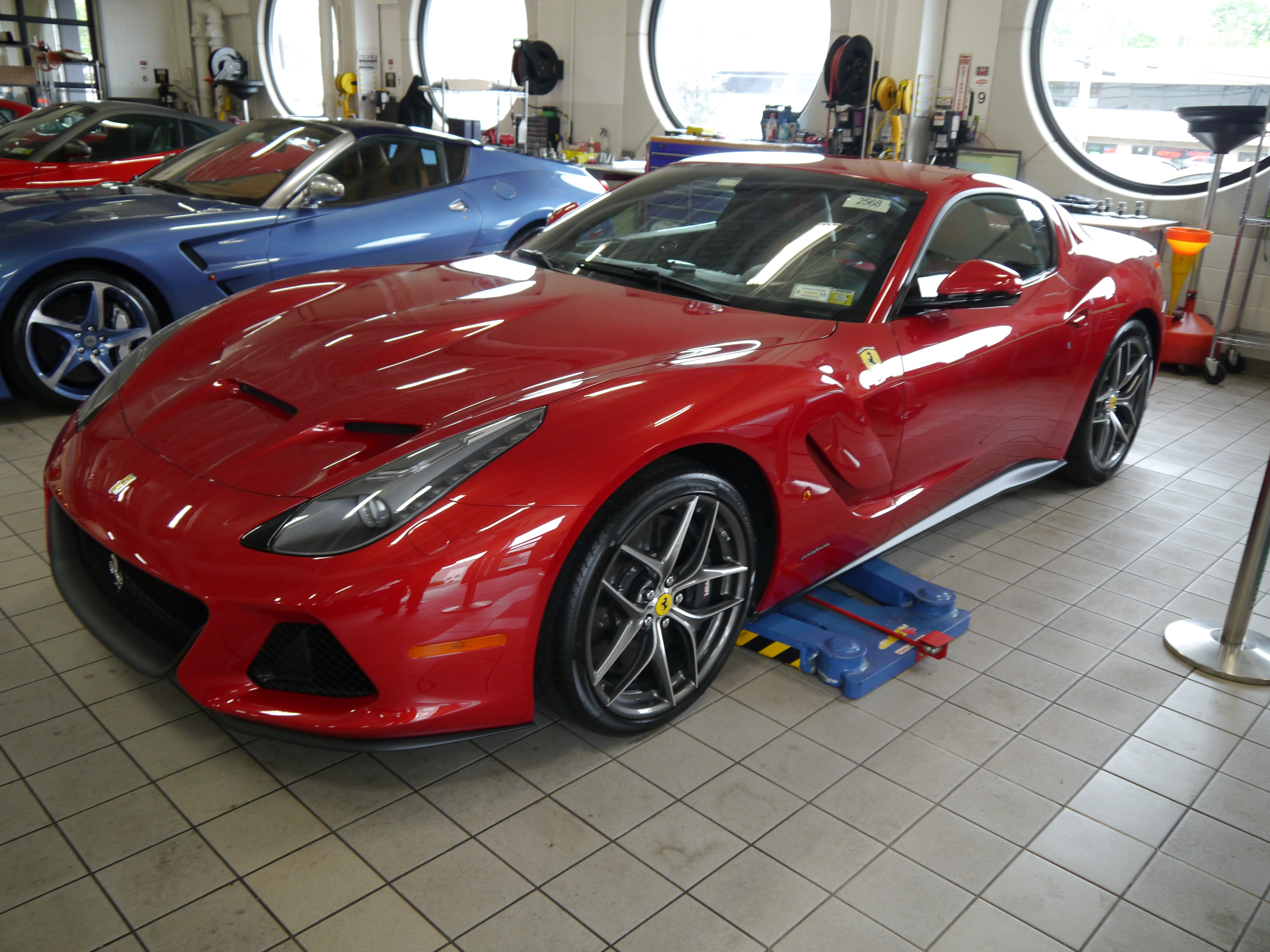
Front left view

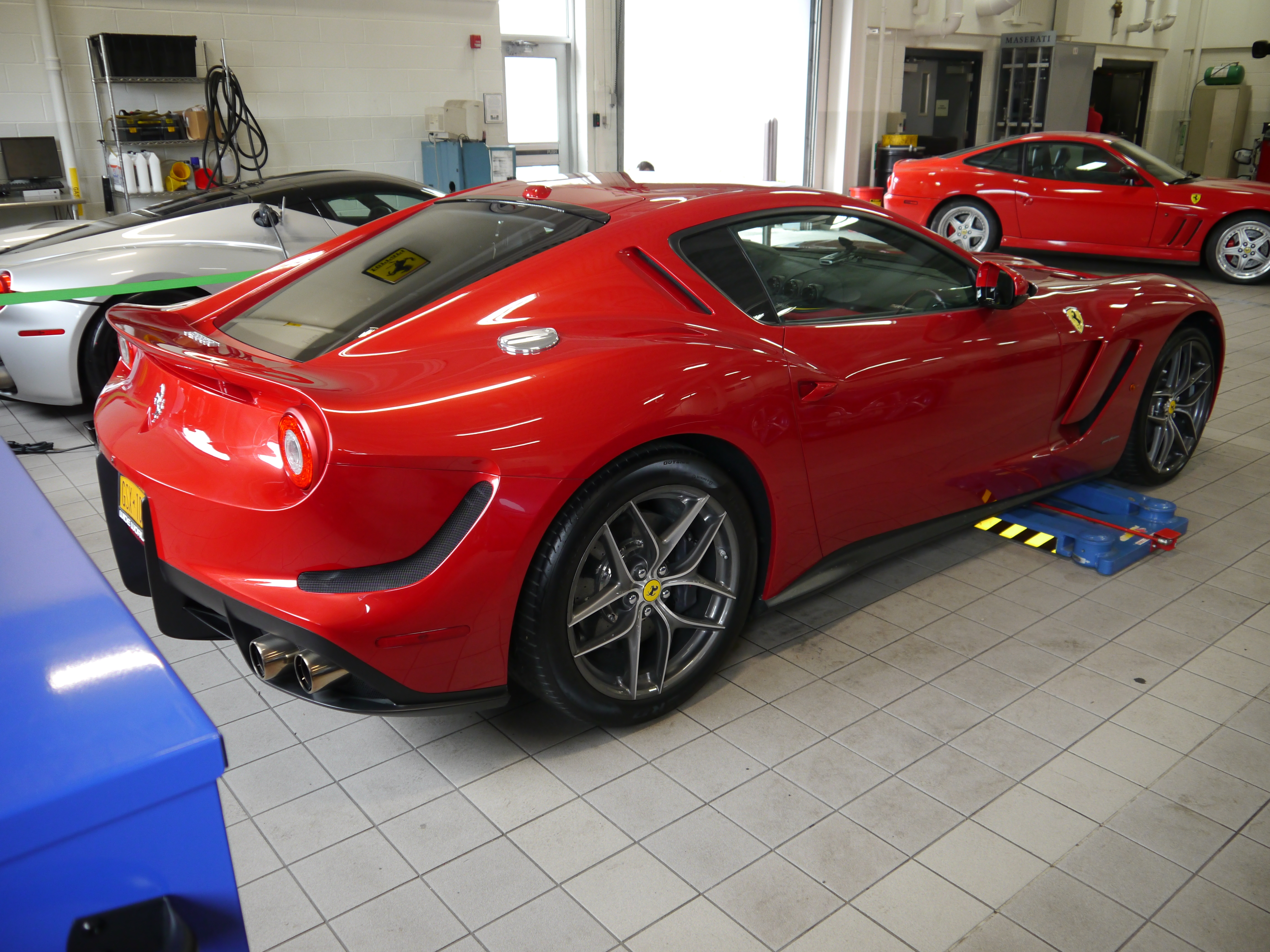
Rear right view

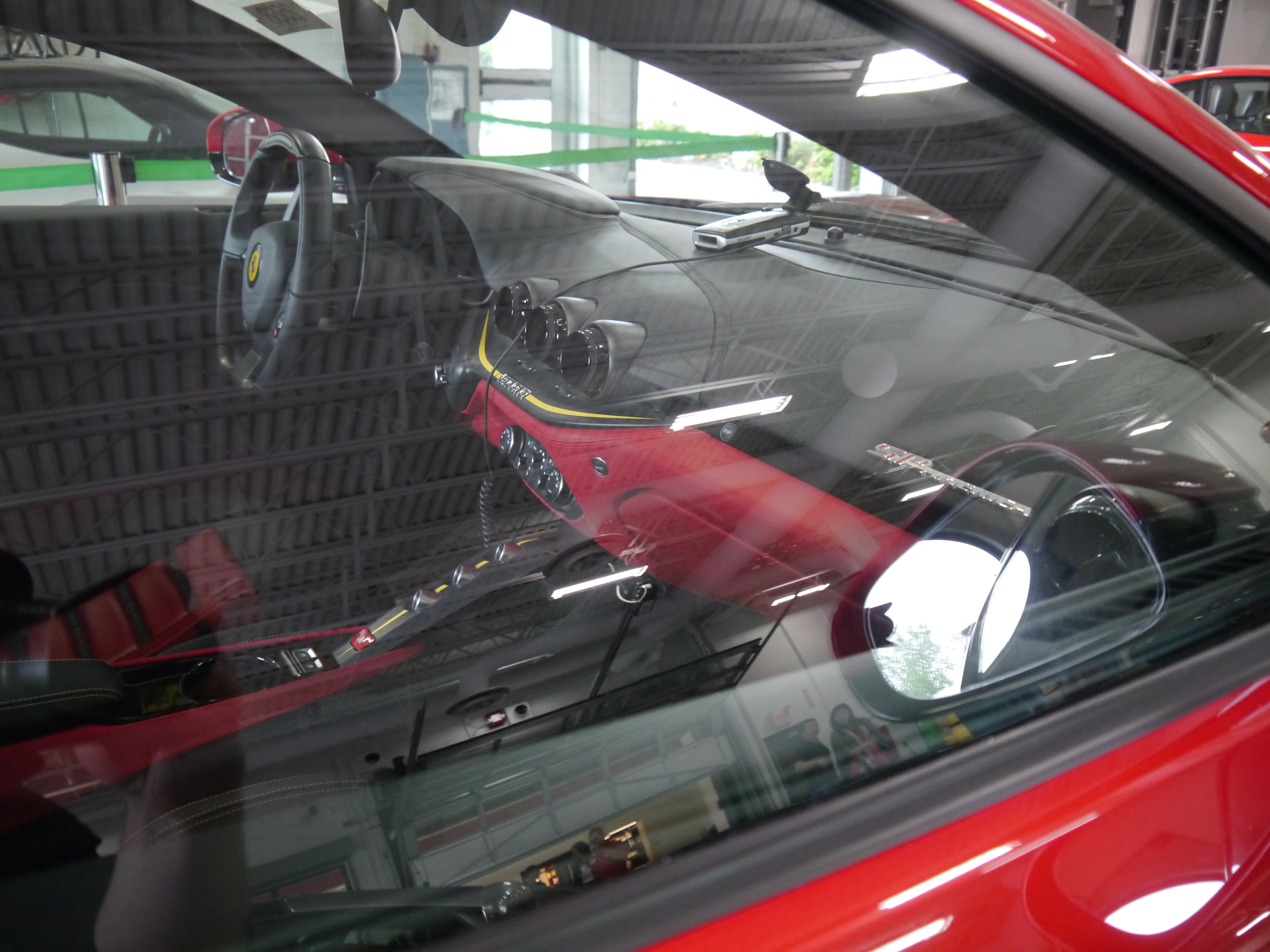
Interior

=== F60 America ===
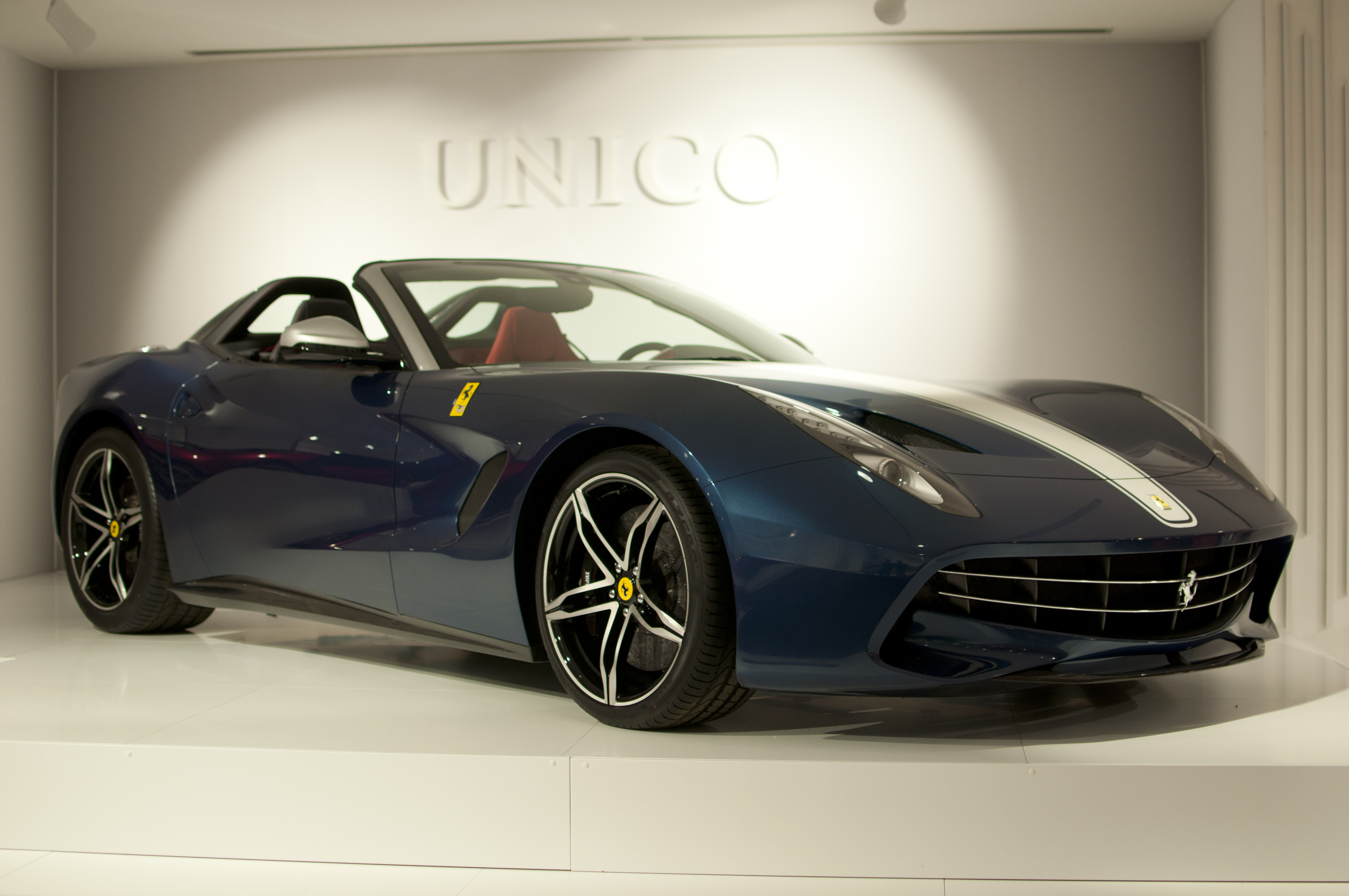
Ferrari F60 America

The Ferrari F60 America is a limited production roadster derivative of the F12, built to celebrate 60 years of Ferrari in North America. Production was limited to ten examples and according to the manufacturer, all were already spoken for at the time of the car's public introduction in October 2014. The open-top configuration pays homage to US-only limited production convertible Ferraris of the past, such as the 275 GTS/4 NART Spider. Compared to the F12, the F60 has all-new bodywork; it uses a light removable soft top instead of a conventional convertible top. Each of the ten examples built features an asymmetrical cabin design with red trim for the driver's area and black for the passenger, American flag detailing in the center of the backrests of both seats, and classic blue and white North American Racing Team livery.

=== Touring Berlinetta Lusso ===
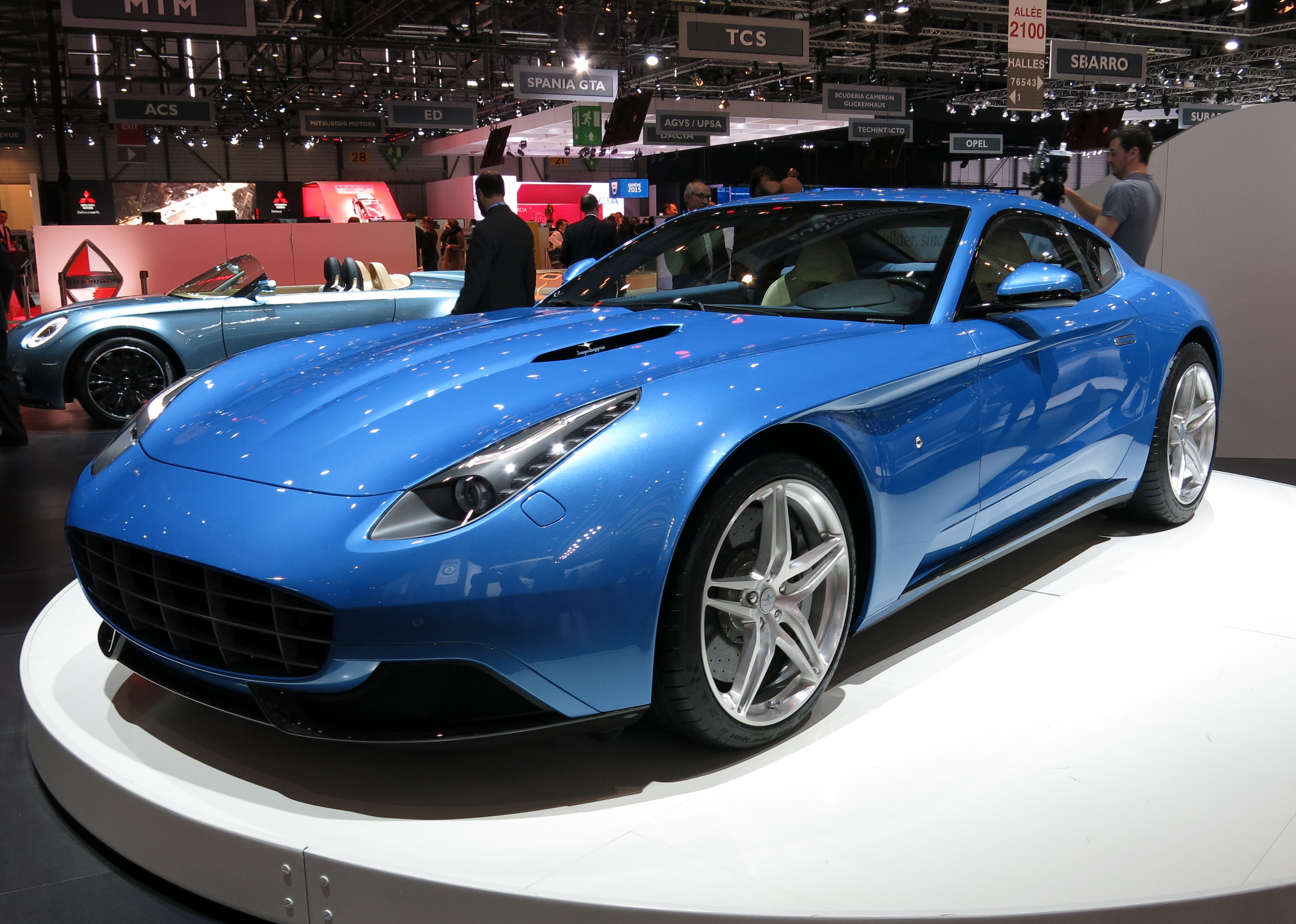
Touring Superleggera Berlinetta Lusso at the 2015 Geneva Motor Show

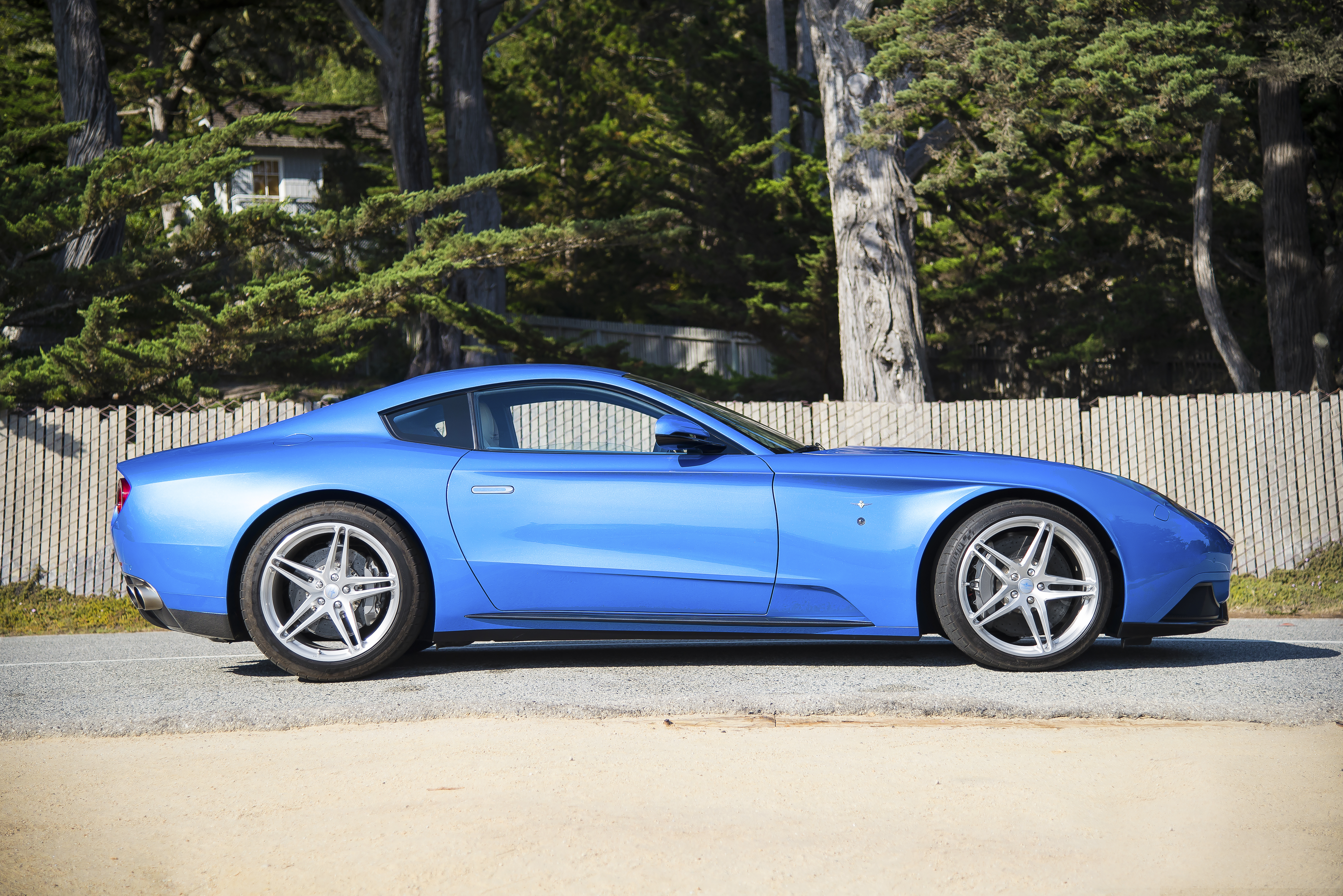
Touring Superleggera Berlinetta Lusso in Pebble Beach

At the March 2015 Geneva Motor Show Carrozzeria Touring unveiled the Touring Berlinetta Lusso, a two-seater, three-box coupé based on the F12berlinetta. Carrozzeria Touring developed the car on a client's request. The car has coachbuilt bodywork with each body panel of the car made from hand beaten aluminium. It also features a special blue exterior colour and a redesigned interior. The mechanical components are the same as the F12berlinetta, as are the headlamps and tail lamps. A production run of five examples was announced.

=== F12berlinetta SG50 Edition ===
The Ferrari F12berlinetta SG50 Edition is a one-off made to celebrate Singapore's 50 years of independence. Changes over the F12berlinetta include a red and white livery featuring a special ‘Rosso Singapore’ paintwork on the exterior and leather upholstery in the same colour on the interior. The colour scheme is designed to mirror the colors of the Singapore flag. Additionally the car has Singaporean lions embroidered in the headrest as well as the words "Singapore 50th Anniversary Edition 1/1" on the steering wheel and the door sills.

=== SP275 RW Competizione ===
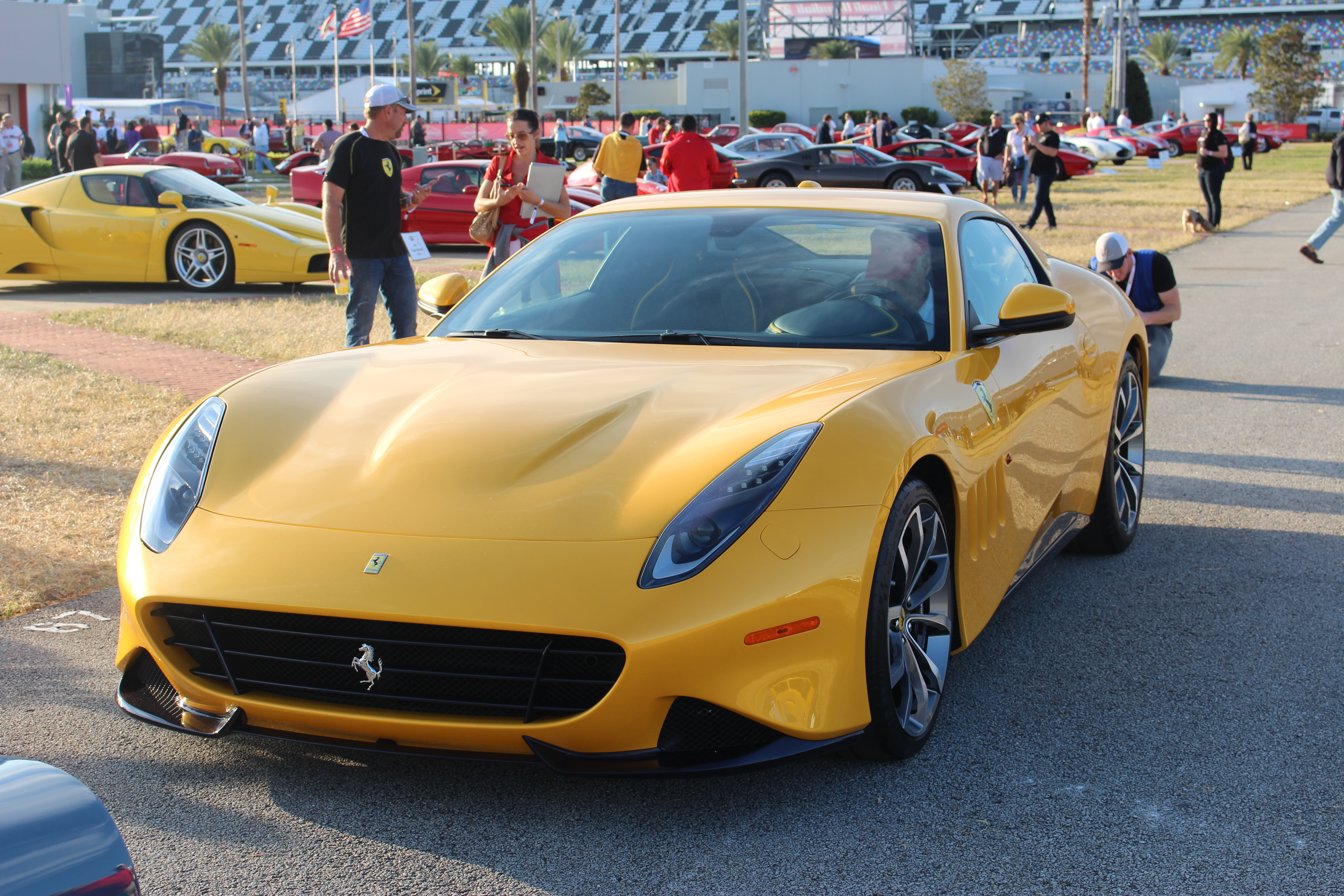
SP275 RW at the 2016 Ferrari Finali Mondiali in Daytona, Florida

The Ferrari SP275 RW Competizione is a one-off model inspired by the 1964 Ferrari 275 GTB/C Speciale that won in the GT class at the 1965 24 Hours of Le Mans and placed 3rd overall. Its design is a collaboration between the Ferrari Styling Centre and Pininfarina. The car is based on the F12berlinetta but utilises the 6.3 liter V12 engine from the F12tdf which generates a power output of 780 PS (574 kW; 769 hp) and 705 N⋅m (520 lb⋅ft) of torque. The car has a coachbuilt body with a redesigned front fascia and headlights, widened rear track, custom 20 inch 10 spoke forged alloy wheels, an aluminium fuel filler cap and unique yellow exterior colour. The body also has 3 vents behind each side window, 3 on each side of the rear bumper and 4 vents on each fender inspired by the vents on the racing 275 GTB/C. The "RW" designation stands for the initials of the person who commissioned the car, Florida dentist Rick Workman, who also owns the 599-based Ferrari P540 Superfast Aperta unveiled in 2009 and the F12-based F60 America mentioned above that was unveiled in 2014.

=== SP3JC ===
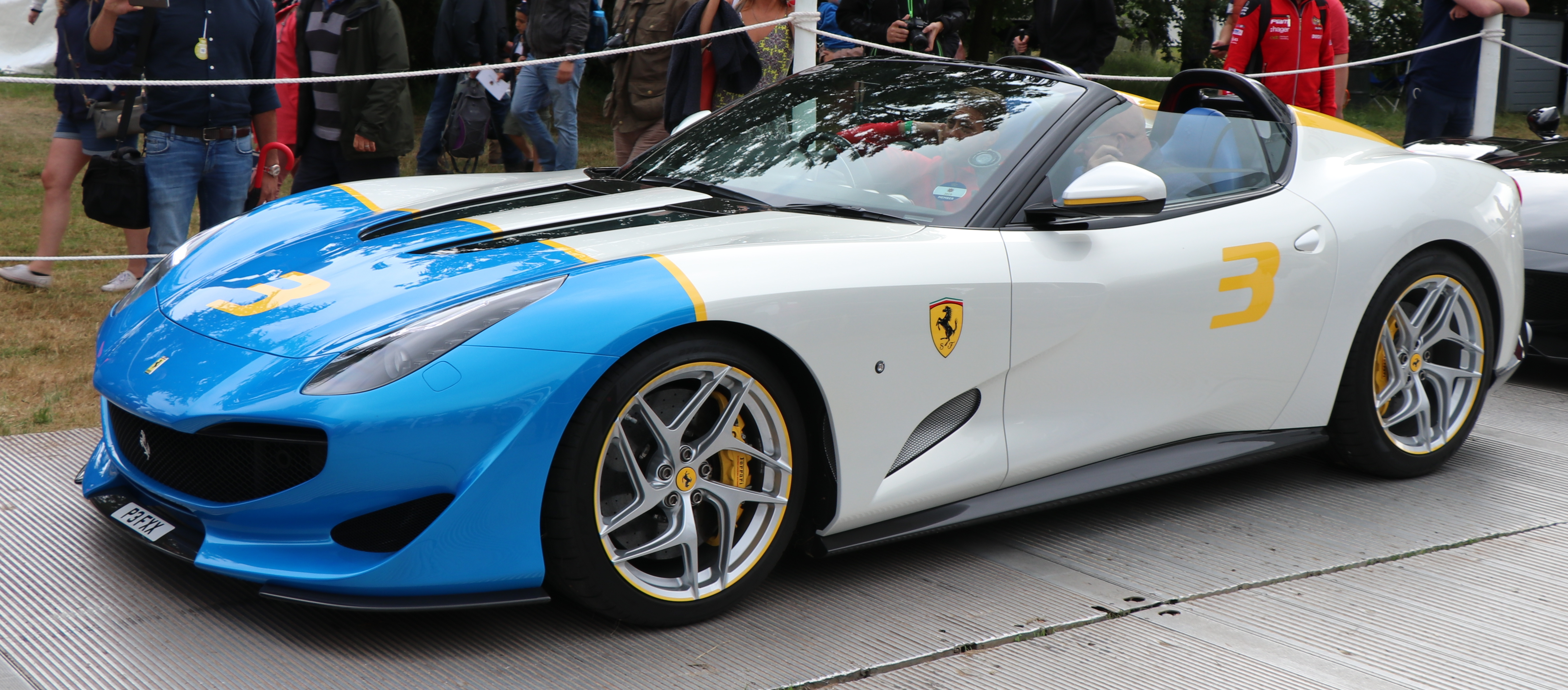
The RHD SP3JC

Presented in November 2018, the Ferrari SP3JC is a roadster based on the F12tdf. There were two matching cars ordered, one in LHD, the other in RHD with different liveries. They were designed by the Ferrari Styling Centre to pay homage to Ferrari roadsters of 1950s and 1960s. They are powered by the V12 engine from the F12tdf which is unchanged from the production car. The body has been completely redesigned, and includes redesigned front and rear fascias, a new front bumper, a rear diffuser, transparent hood vents that show off the engine, roll hoops behind the seats, taillights and wheels from the 812 Superfast. The RHD car has a white and blue paint job that pays homage to the 1962 Ferrari 250 GTO. "JC" stands for John Collins, a Scottish collector and founder of Talacrest, a classic Ferrari dealer located in the U.K. He commissioned the car in mid 2014 and it took 3.5 years to complete. Ferrari said the design process alone took 2 of those years.

=== Touring Superleggera Aero 3 ===
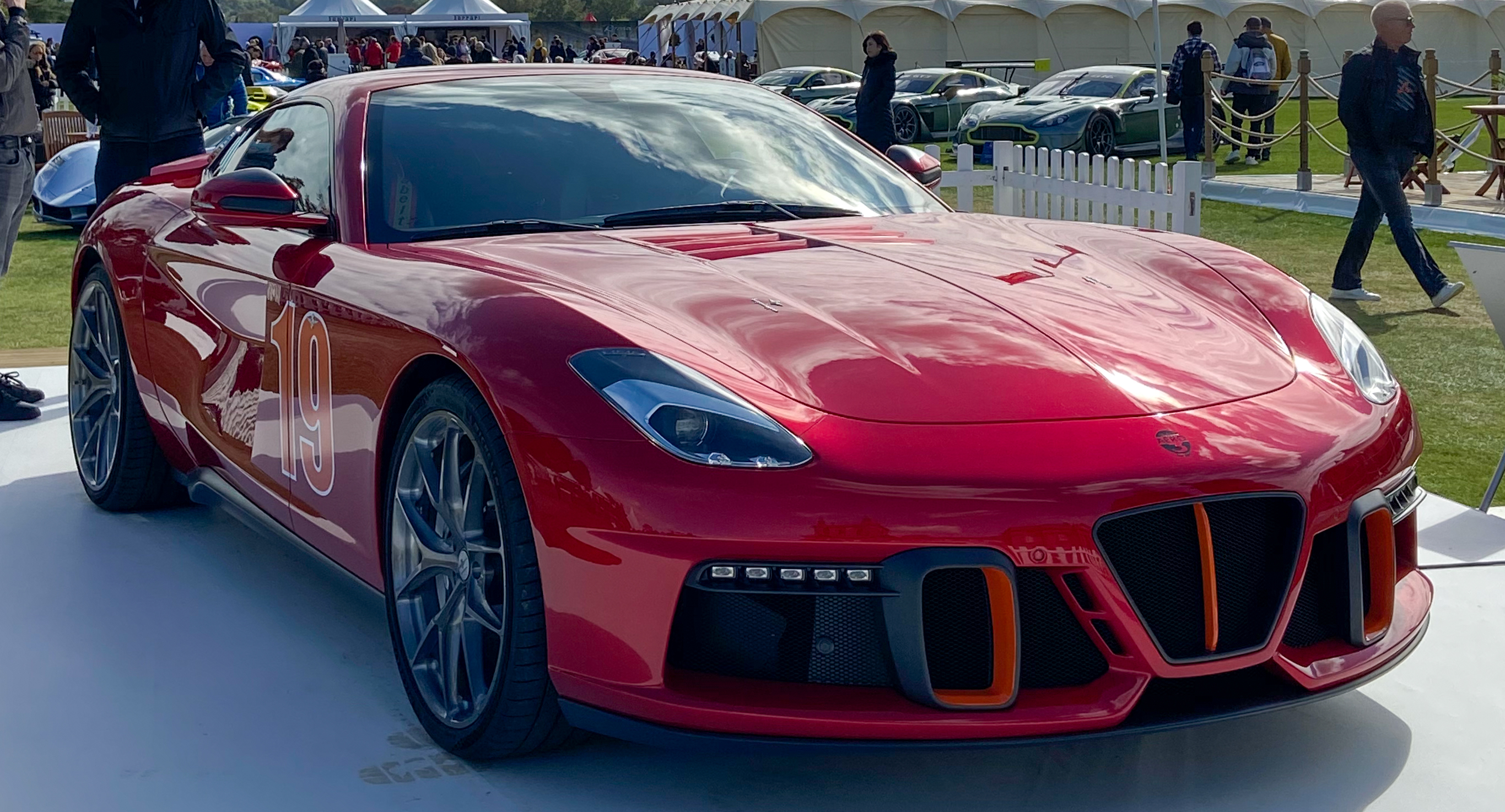

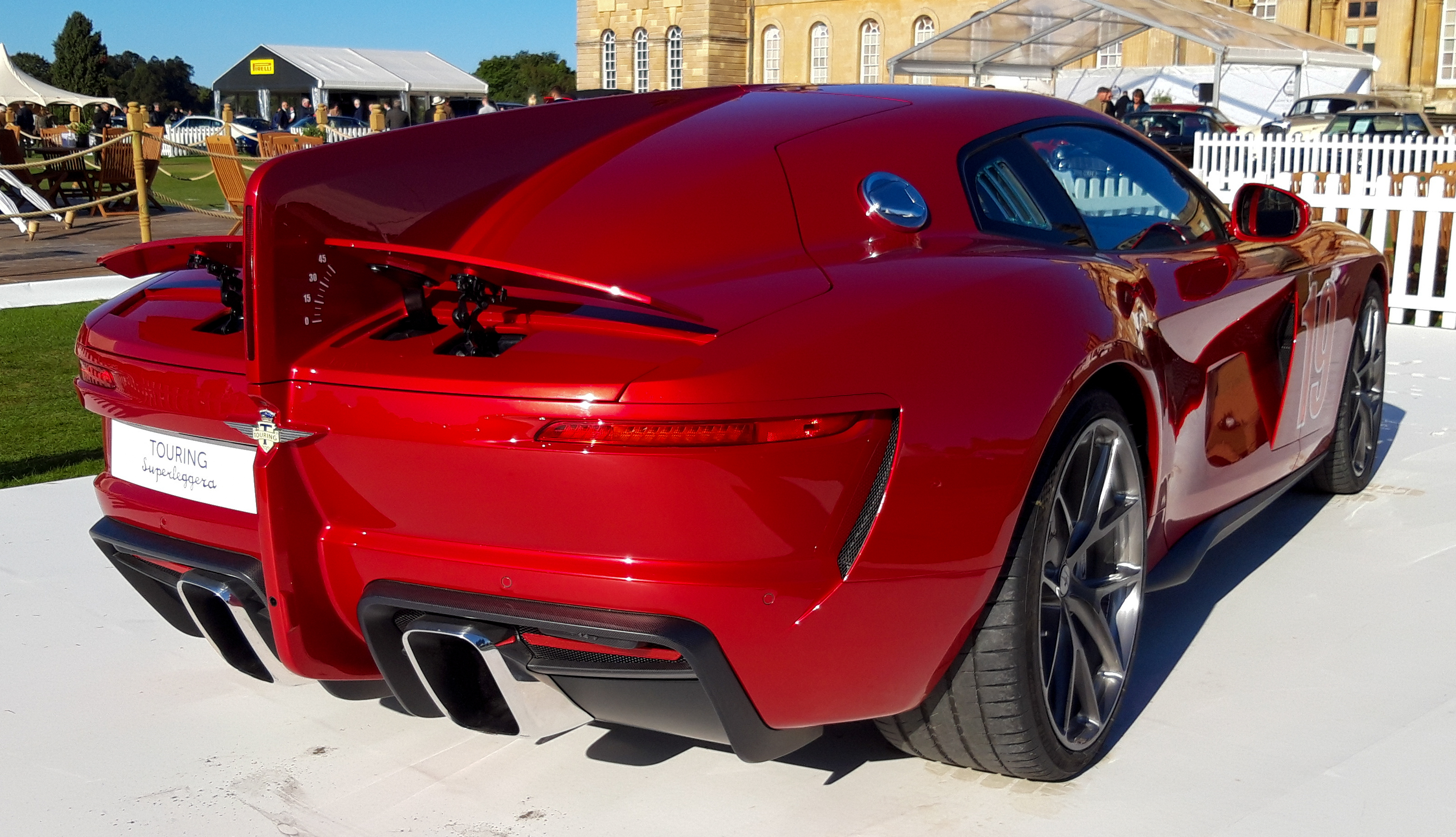
Touring Superleggera Aero 3

The Touring Superleggera Aero 3 is a limited production coachbuilt car by Carrozzeria Touring based on the F12berlinetta. The design of the car is inspired by the Alfa Romeo 8C 2900B that raced at Le Mans in the 1930s. Only 15 cars are to be built.
