= Ferrari FF =

Italian grand tourer

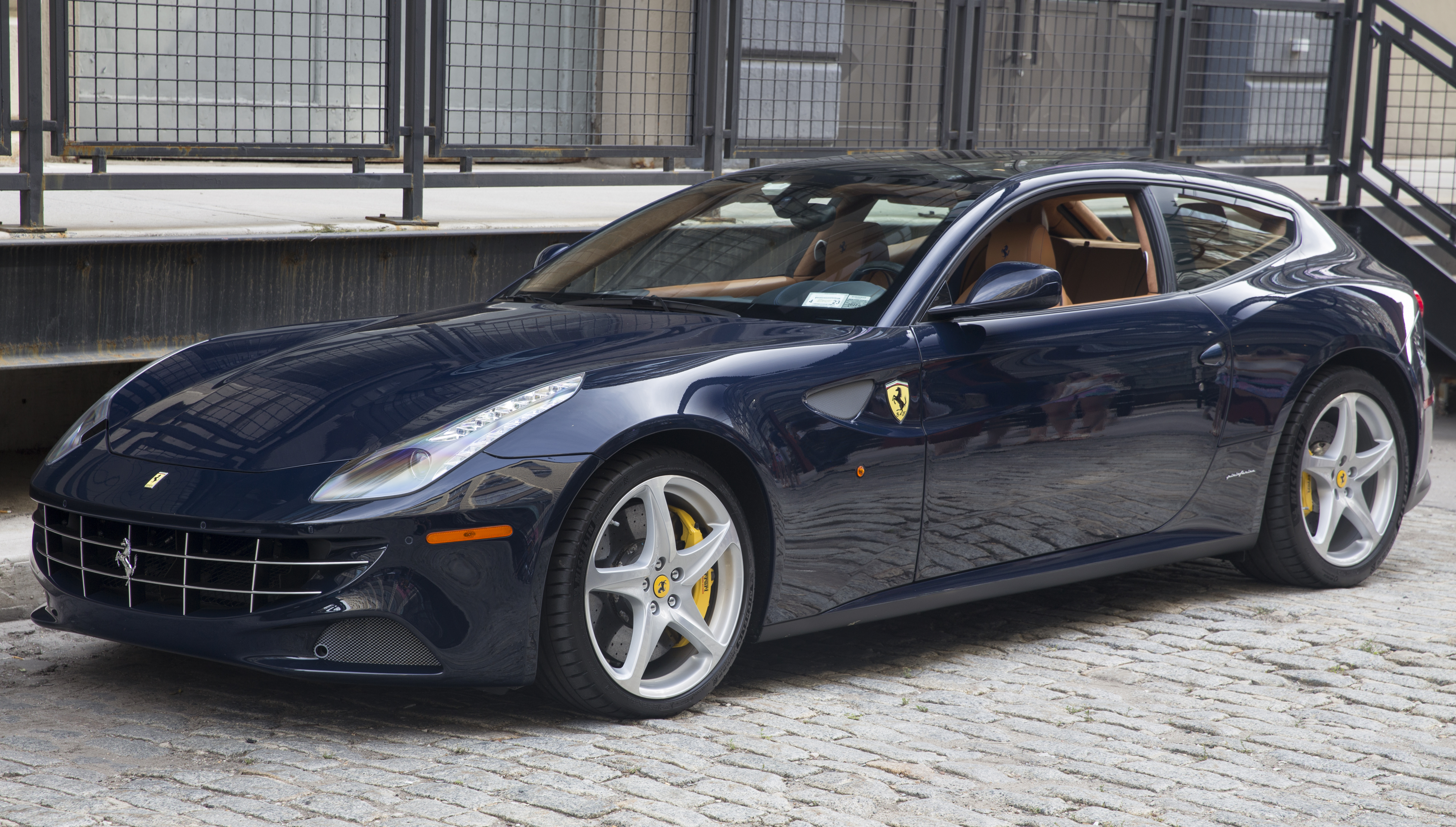

Overview
- Manufacturer: Ferrari
- Model code: Type F151
- Production: 2011–2016
- Assembly: Italy: Maranello
- Designer: Lowie Vermeersch at Pininfarina and Flavio Manzoni at Ferrari Styling Centre

Body and chassis
- Class: Grand tourer
- Body style: 3-door shooting brake
- Layout: Front mid-engine, four-wheel-drive
- Related: Ferrari F12berlinetta

Powertrain
- Engine: 6,262 cc (382.1 cu in; 6.262 L) F140 EB V12
- Transmission: 7-speed Magna 7DCL750 dual-clutch

Dimensions
- Wheelbase: 2,990 mm (117.7 in)
- Length: 4,907 mm (193.2 in)
- Width: 1,953 mm (76.9 in)
- Height: 1,379 mm (54.3 in)
- Kerb weight: 1,880 kg (4,145 lb)

Chronology
- Predecessor: Ferrari 612 Scaglietti
- Successor: Ferrari GTC4Lusso

The Ferrari FF (Type F151) is a grand touring car that was produced by the Italian carmaker Ferrari from 2011 to 2016. The successor to the 612 Scaglietti, the FF—whose name is an acronym for "Ferrari Four" (Note: Alluding to its four-wheel drive capability)—is a three-door shooting brake. Development of the FF began in 2007, and it debuted at the Geneva International Motor Show in March 2011; production started in the same month in Maranello, Italy. Designed under the direction of Lowie Vermeersch and Flavio Manzoni, the FF shares parts, mainly the engine, with the F12berlinetta—a coupé that was introduced one year after the FF.

Upon its release, the FF was the world's fastest four-seater car and Ferrari's second-fastest grand tourer after the 599 GTO. The FF features a 6.3 L V12 engine that produces a power output of 490 kW (650 hp) and a torque output of 683 N⋅m (504 lb⋅ft), sufficient to give the car a maximum speed of 335 km/h (208 mph) and a 0 to 100 km/h (62 mph) acceleration of 3.7 seconds. Its transmission is a seven-speed dual-clutch. The FF has received positive reviews from critics, who appreciate its design but criticise its steep price. The recipient of numerous awards, including Top Gear's Estate Car of the Year in 2011, the FF was succeeded by the GTC4Lusso in 2016.

== History ==
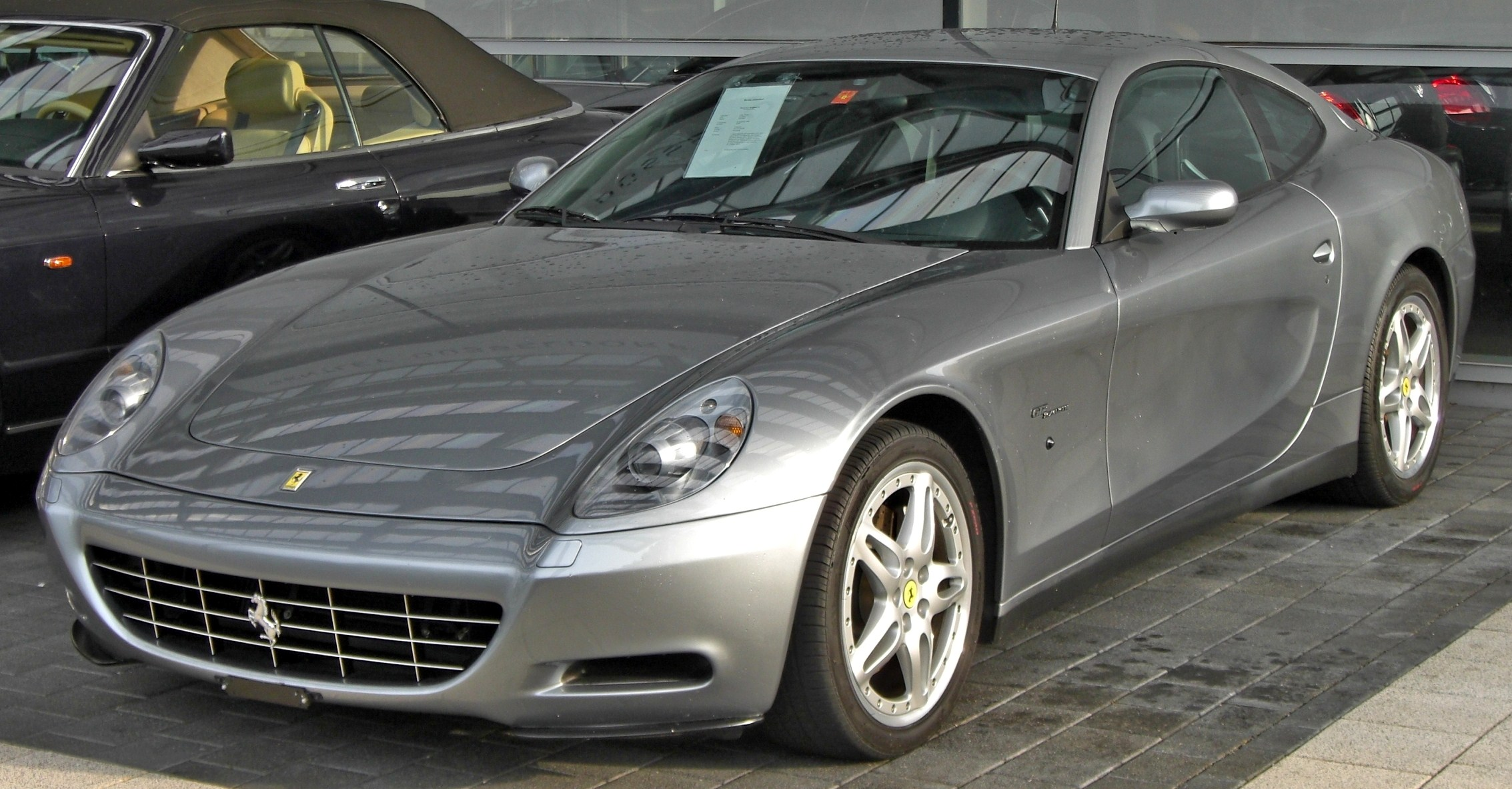
The 612 Scaglietti, which preceded the FF

The Italian carmaker Ferrari began development of a successor to the 612 Scaglietti in 2007. Work on the upcoming shooting brake car began under the direction of Flavio Manzoni and Lowie Vermeersch, the latter of whom served as former Design Director at Pininfarina. Although Ferrari initially wanted the car developed from the Pininfarina Sintesi, a concept car, the project was transferred to Italdesign, which presented an angular proposal. It eventually returned to Pininfarina for further development. Other developments took place at Ferrari's Styling Centre.

Ferrari debuted the FF at the Geneva International Motor Show in March 2011. Official manufacture began in the same month at their facility in Maranello. At launch, Ferrari announced that it would produce 800 FF units annually. The carmaker further stated that the entire first year's production run had already been sold out. Upon its release, the FF became the world's fastest four-seater car and Ferrari's second-fastest grand tourer after the 599 GTO. It was produced at the Maranello facility until it was discontinued in 2016 after a production run of five years during which 2,291 units had been built. It was succeeded by the GTC4Lusso.

== Design and naming ==
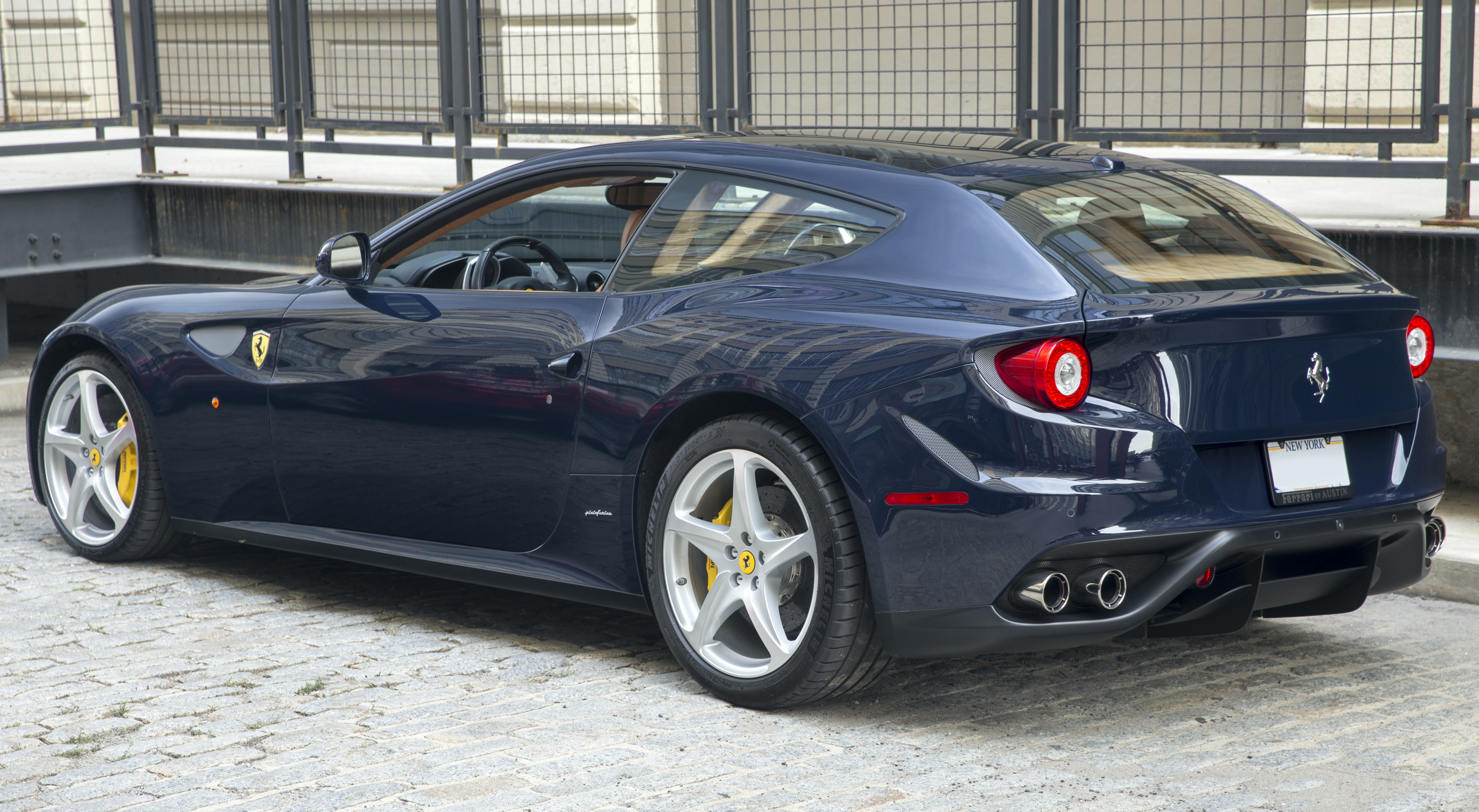
Rear view of the FF

The name "FF" is an acronym for "Ferrari Four", highlighting its four-wheel drive capability. The FF reflects the design language of contemporary Ferrari models, incorporating the distinctive pulled-back headlights of the 458 Italia and the twin circular tail-lights found on both the 458 and the 599 GTB Fiorano. The FF incorporates a predominantly space frame construction and—like all contemporary Ferraris—is made from aluminium. This design, compared to its predecessor, reduces weight by five per cent and increases torsional rigidity by six per cent.

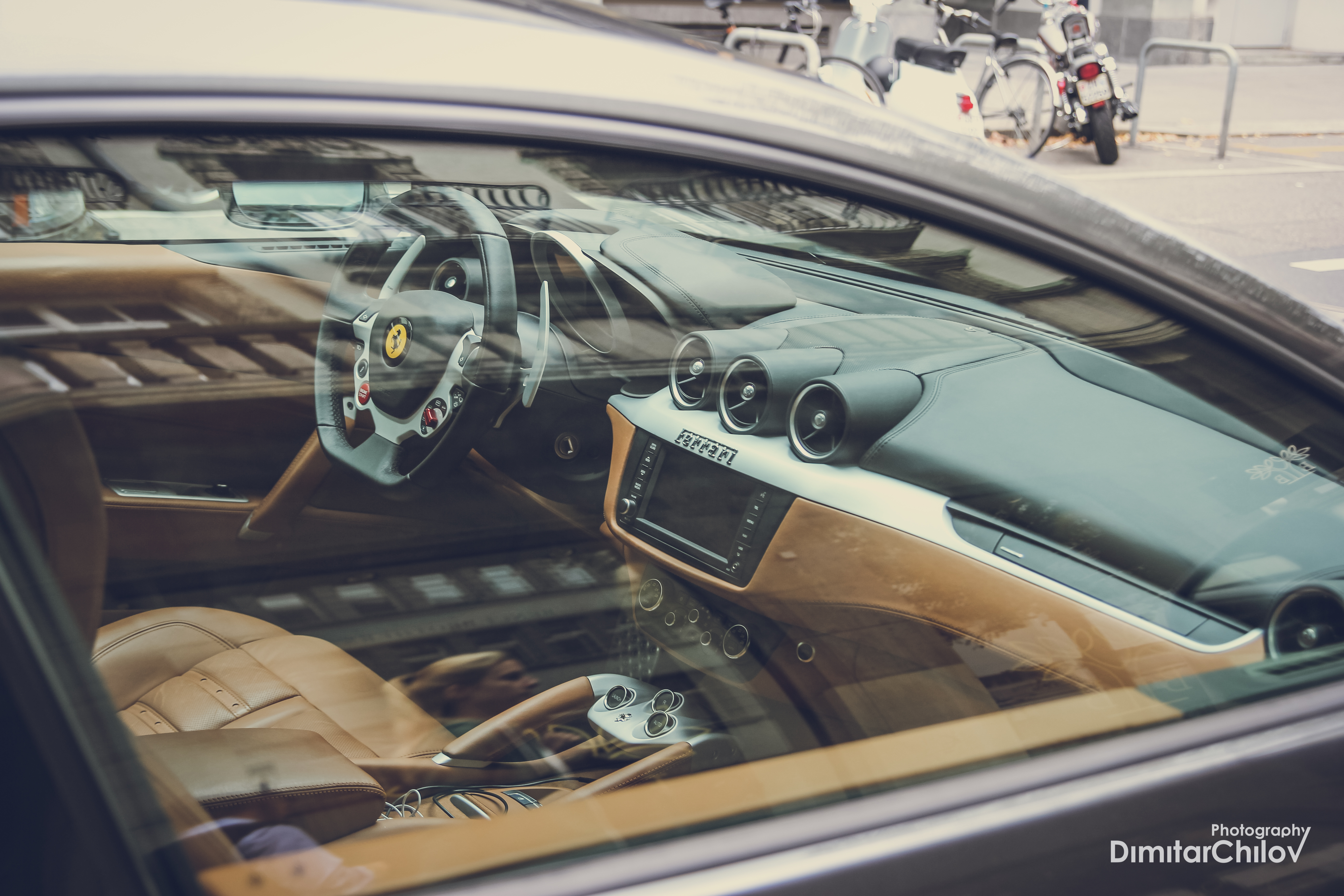
Ferrari FF interior

The FF is a grand touring car with three doors and four seats. The FF's seven-speed dual-clutch automatic gearbox is positioned at the rear of the car, contributing to its weight distribution of 47 per cent at the front and 53 per cent at the rear. The electronic rear differential is built into the gearbox housing, and all chassis and powertrain control systems—including the magnetic adaptive shocks, stability control, and electronic differential—are combined into a single module. The FF's design is largely influenced by the need to manage airflow efficiently over and around its body. The FF has significant aerodynamic downforce, improving road grip at higher speeds, most prominently visible in the split-level diffuser at the rear, which features an aerofoil-shaped centre element. This comes at the cost of a relatively high drag coefficient of Cd=0.329. Vents along the sides and rear direct air out of the wheel wells and around the car, helping minimise lift and drag.

The four-wheel drive system in the FF is referred to as "4RM" (four ruote motrici—Italian for 4WD). At 41 kilograms (90 lb), it weighs fifty per cent less than traditional methods, helping maintain a low centre of gravity. This system uses a secondary gearbox to channel power from the front of the engine. The front gearbox is geared six per cent longer than the rear's first gear and six per cent longer than the rear's fourth gear (reverse is the same). Thus, the front gearbox's first gear covers the rear's first and second gears, while its second gear covers the rear's third and fourth gears. Power is transmitted through two electronically controlled, hydraulic wet multiplate clutches, located on the driver's side of the front transmission, one for each wheel. These clutches adjust slip to match the speed of the rear wheels and enable torque vectoring for side-to-side power distribution.

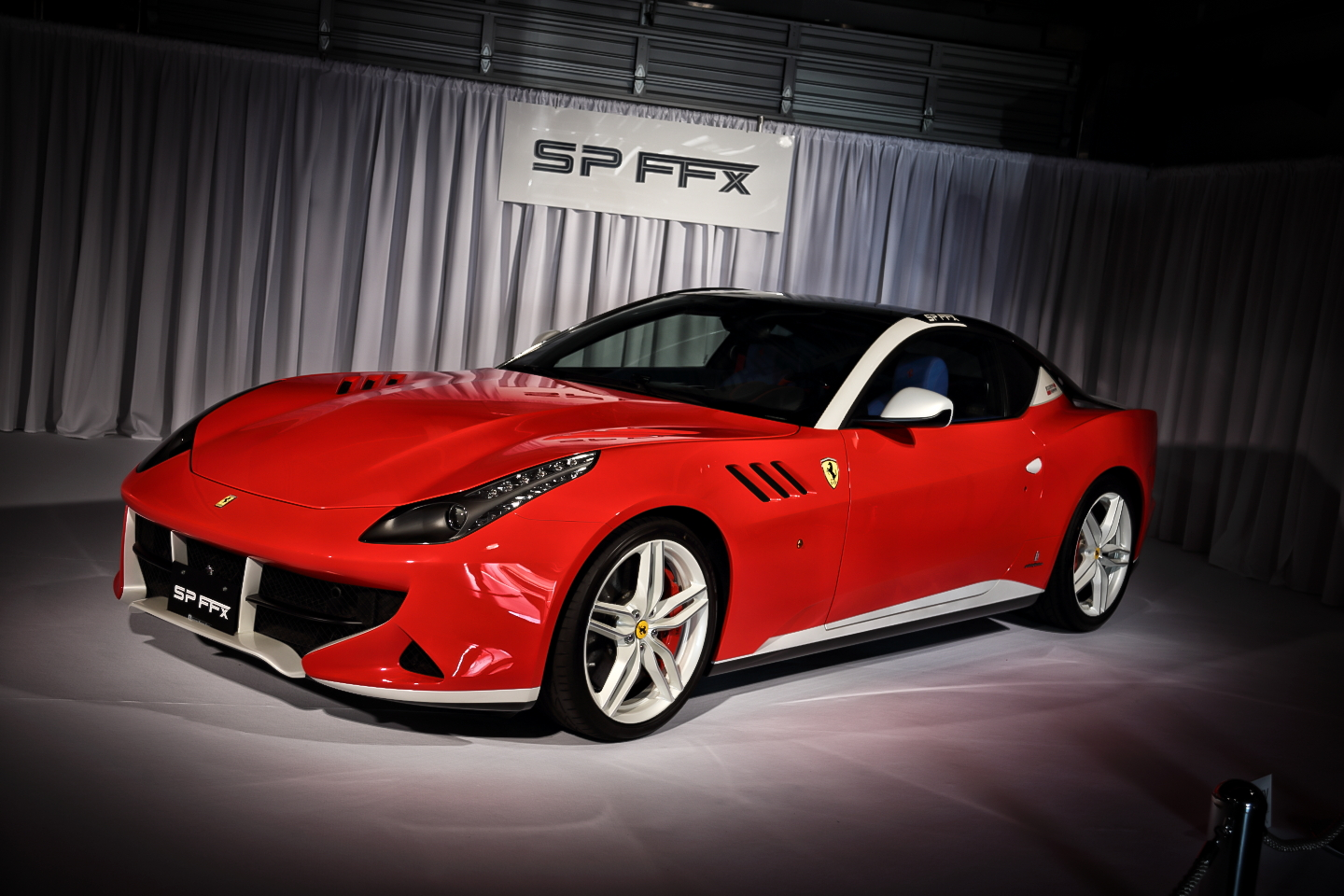
Ferrari SP FFX

The FF features a 6,262 cc (6.3 L; 382.1 cu in) naturally aspirated direct injection V12 engine. It produces a power output of 485 kW (660 PS; 651 hp) at 8,000 rpm and a torque output of 683 N⋅m (504 lb⋅ft), sufficient to give the car a maximum speed of 335 km/h (208 mph) and a 0 to 100 km/h (62 mph) acceleration of 3.7 seconds. The FF shares its engine with the F12berlinetta, a coupé introduced in 2012. The car's suspension is known as the "SCM3", a magnetorheological self-adjusting damping system. The FF includes Brembo's carbon ceramic brakes. The FF has a CO_{2} output of 360 grams per kilometre (20 oz/mi) and a fuel consumption figure of 15.4 litres per 100 kilometres (18.3 mpg_{‑imp}; 15.3 mpg_{‑US}).

The shooting brake design, with its folding rear seats, gives the Ferrari FF a boot capacity of 450 litres (16 cu ft), which can be expanded to 800 litres (28 cu ft) when the rear seats are lowered. A one-off model based on the FF, known as the SP FFX, was introduced in 2014, featuring a custom body with a coupé-style rear end instead of the FF's shooting brake design. Commissioned by a customer in Japan, it was built by Ferrari's special vehicles division to a design by Pininfarina. Early patent drawings of the SP FFX led to speculation that it was the design for the next-generation Ferrari California.

== Reception ==
The FF has received primarily positive reviews, some publications describing the car as a "Ferrari for the whole family". In 2011 Jeremy Clarkson, reviewing for The Sunday Times, found the FF "a very special, very fast car, with a dollop of practicality and a four-wheel drive system that may not add much". He noted that while the front design is "fantastic" and the side view is "wonderful", he found the rear to be lacking, describing it as "hopeless" and bland", suggesting that "Kia does a better job". David Undercoffler, in a 2013 review for the Los Angeles Times, stated that the FF "represents the next evolution in a long line of grand touring cars from Ferrari, as opposed to more high-strung sports cars such the mid-engined 458, designed with race-car handling foremost in mind". Ezra Dyer from The New York Times described the FF as "a daring car" and praised the "confidence it represents".

Forbes' Hannah Elliot called the FF "the most perfectly balanced car [she could] ever remember driving". The Wall Street Journal writer Dan Neil characterised the FF as a "car that despises prettiness and mocks your bourgeois notions of sleek and rakish", while in another review he described the FF as "the coolest Ferrari of all time", commending its impressive performance without concern for aesthetics. The FF was labelled as "docile" and "user-friendly" by Motor Trend's Patrick Hoey, who also appreciated its light steering, but criticised its "ignition key that must be turned before the start button will operate" and its steep price.

The FF is the recipient of numerous accolades. At the Shanghai Motor Show, the Chinese-language Car and Driver awarded the FF with the Most Beautiful Super Car of 2011. That year, the magazine Top Gear gave the FF the Estate Car of the Year. Top Gear India awarded the FF with the Luxury Car of the Year 2012.
