= Pininfarina =

Italian car design firm and coachbuilder

Coordinates: 44.9693628°N 7.7650577°E

Pininfarina S.p.A.
- Logo used since 1930

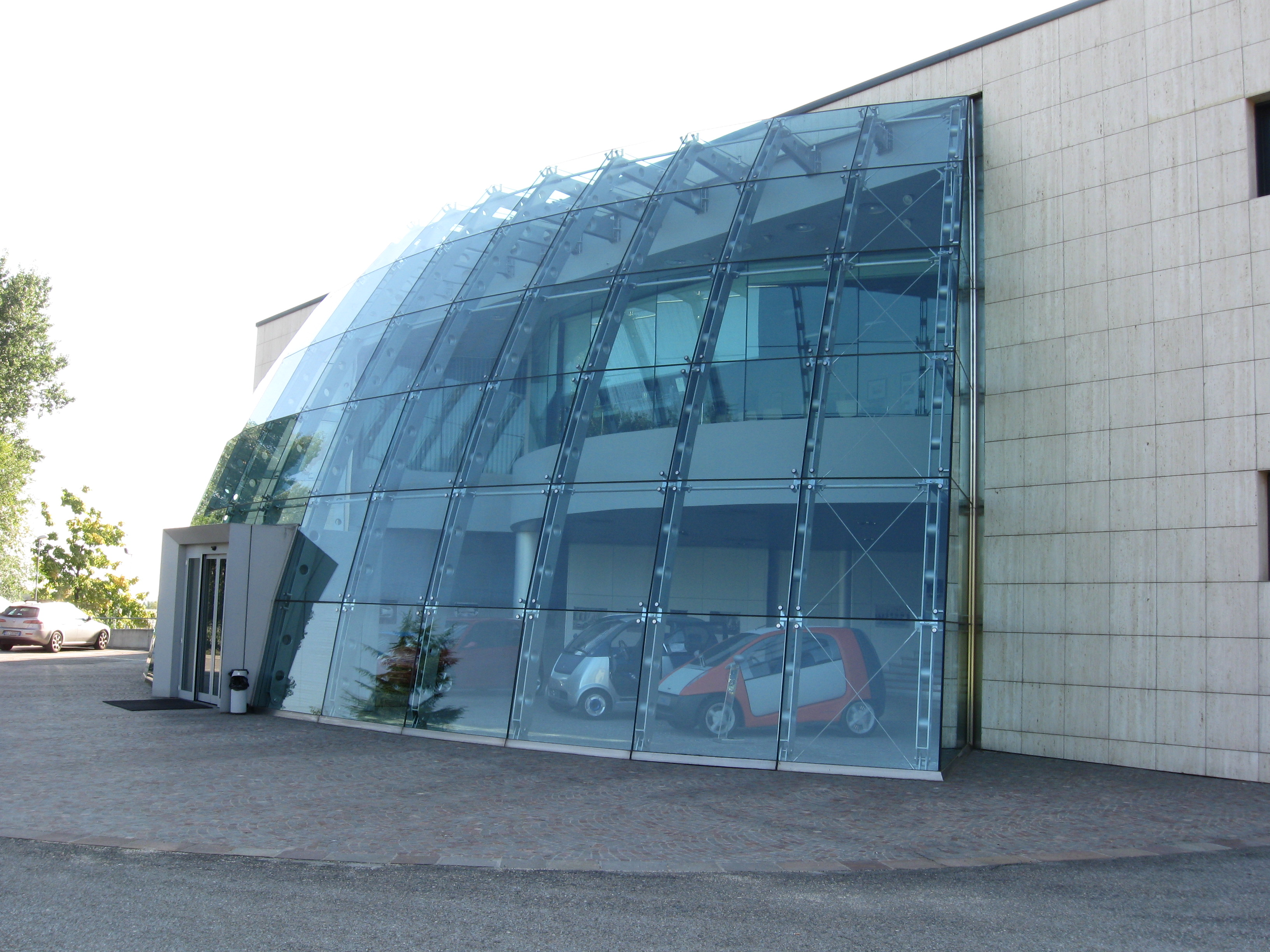
- Pininfarina Design Centre
- Type: Public (S.p.A.)
- Traded as: BIT: PINF
- Industry: Automotive; Design
- Founded: 23 May 1930; 96 years ago
- Founder: Battista Farina
- Headquarters: Cambiano, Italy
- Area served: Worldwide
- Key people: Paolo Dellachà (CEO) Gaurav Godbole (CFO)
- Services: Automotive design
- Revenue: ▲US$ 78.5 Million (2020)
- Owner: Tech Mahindra and Mahindra & Mahindra (76.06%)
- Number of employees: 700+ (2021)
- Parent: Tech Mahindra and Mahindra & Mahindra
- Subsidiaries: Automobili Pininfarina
- Website: www.pininfarina.it

Pininfarina S.p.A. (/ˌpɪnɪnfəˈriːnə/ PIN-in-fə-REE-nə, Italian: [piniɱfaˈriːna]; short for Pininfarina Società per Azioni) is an Italian car design firm and coachbuilder, with headquarters in Cambiano, Turin, Italy. The company was founded by Battista "Pinin" Farina in 1930. On 14 December 2015, the Indian multinational Mahindra Group acquired 76.06% of Pininfarina S.p.A. for about €168 million.

Pininfarina is employed by a wide variety of automobile manufacturers to design vehicles. These firms have included long-established customers such as Ferrari, Alfa Romeo, Peugeot, Fiat, GM, Lancia and Maserati, to Asian companies such as Honda in Japan, AviChina, Chery, Changfeng, Brilliance, JAC in China, VinFast in Vietnam, and Korean manufacturers Daewoo and Hyundai.

Since the 1980s, Pininfarina has also designed high-speed trains, convertibles, buses, trams, rolling stocks, automated light rail cars, people movers, yachts, airplanes, and private jets. Since the 1986 creation of "Pininfarina Extra", it has consulted on industrial design, interior design, architecture, and graphic design. Pininfarina was run by Battista's son Sergio Pininfarina until 2001, then his grandson Andrea Pininfarina until he died in 2008. After Andrea's death, his younger brother Paolo Pininfarina was appointed CEO.

At its height in 2006, the Pininfarina Group employed 2,768 people, with subsidiary company offices throughout Europe, Morocco, and the United States. As of 2012, with the end of the automotive production series, employment has shrunk to 821. Pininfarina is registered and publicly traded on the Milan Stock Exchange, Borsa Italiana.

== History ==
=== Specialist coachbuilder ===
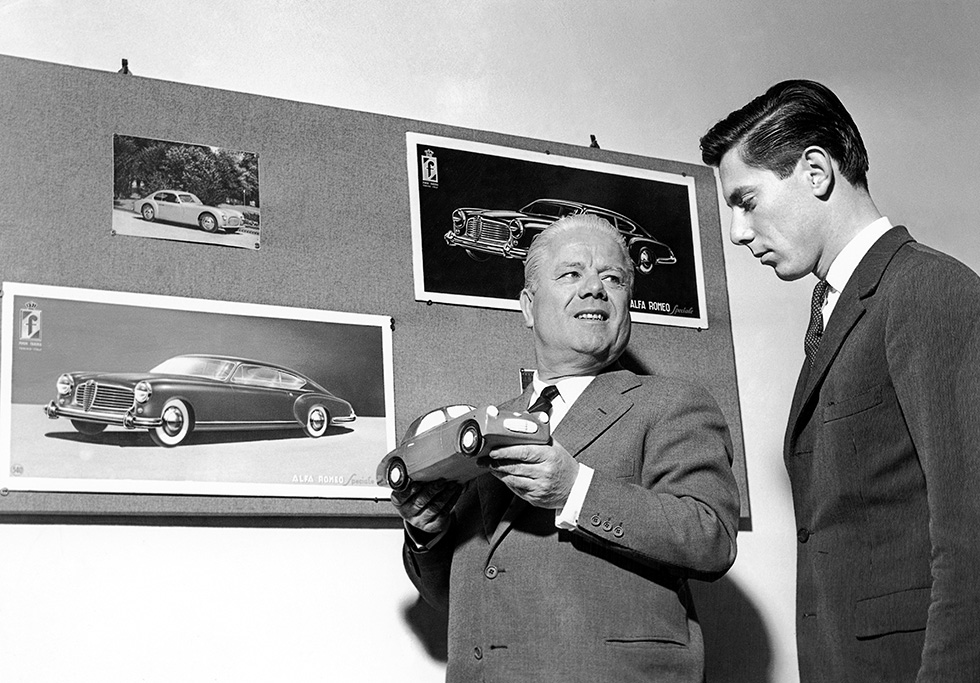
Battista "Pinin" Farina and his son Sergio, c. 1950

When automobile designer and builder Battista "Pinin" Farina broke away from his brother's coachbuilding firm, Stabilimenti Farina, in 1928, he founded "Carrozzeria Pinin Farina" with financial help from his wife's family and Vincenzo Lancia. That first year, the firm employed eighteen and built 50 automobile bodies.

On 22 May 1930 papers were filed to become a corporation, Società anonima Carrozzeria Pinin Farina headquartered in Turin, Italy, at 107 Corso Trapani. During the 1930s, the company built bodies for Lancia, Alfa Romeo, Isotta Fraschini, Hispano-Suiza, Fiat, Cadillac, and Rolls-Royce. With its close relationship with Lancia, the pioneer of the monocoque in automobile design, Farina became the first coachbuilder to build bodies for the new technique also known as unibody construction. This development happened in the mid-1930s when others saw the frameless construction as the end of the independent coachbuilder.

In 1939, World War II ended automobile production, but the company had 400 employees building 150 bodies monthly. The war effort against the Allies brought work making ambulances and searchlight carriages. The Pinin Farina factory was destroyed by Allied bombers, ending the firm's operations.

=== After World War II ===
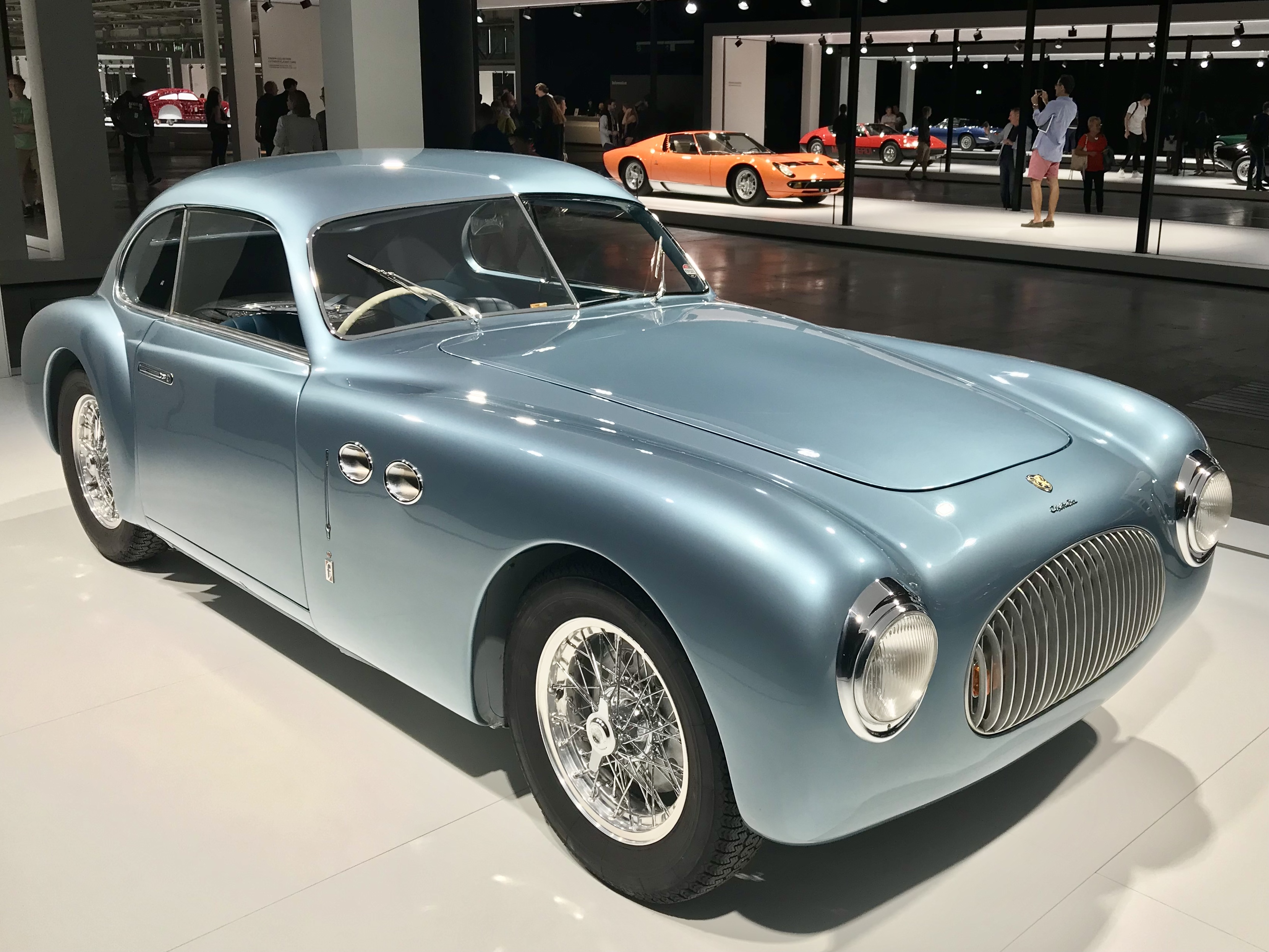
1947 Cisitalia 202 SC

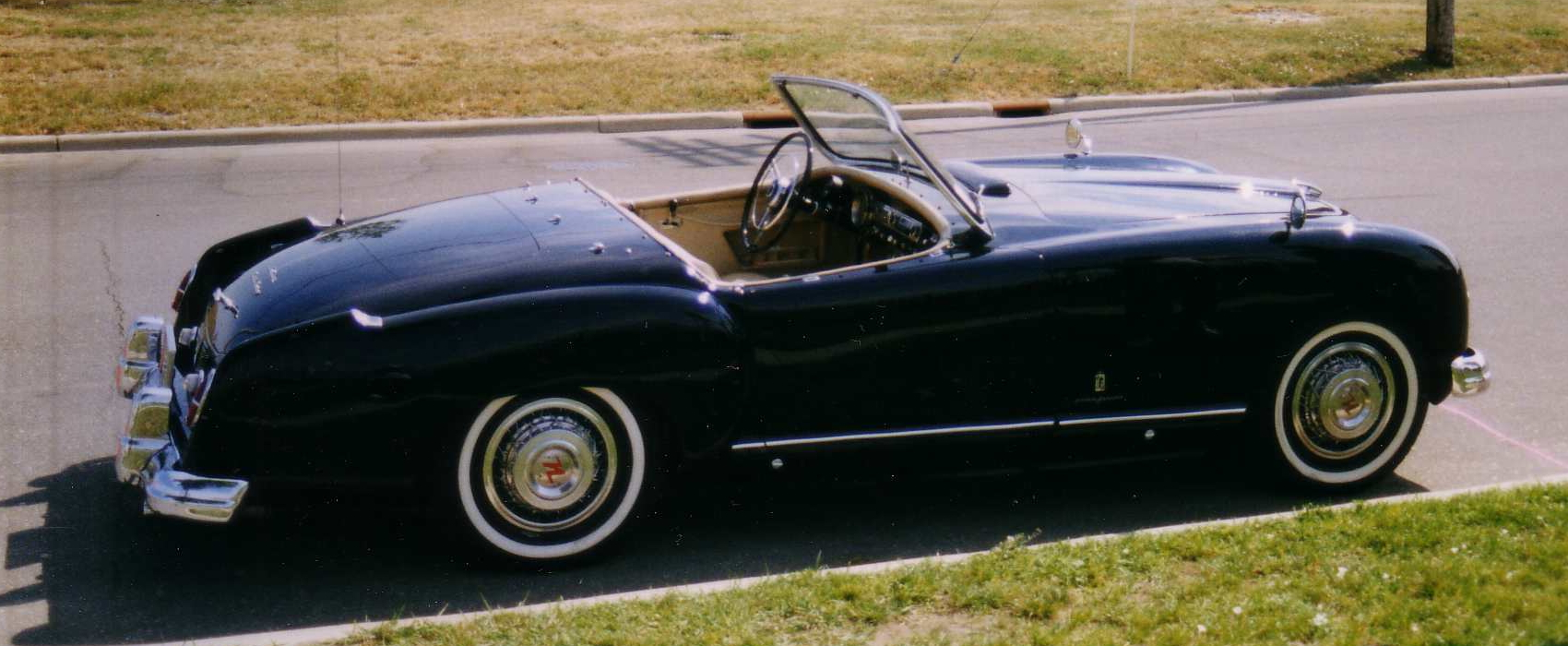
Nash-Healey roadster

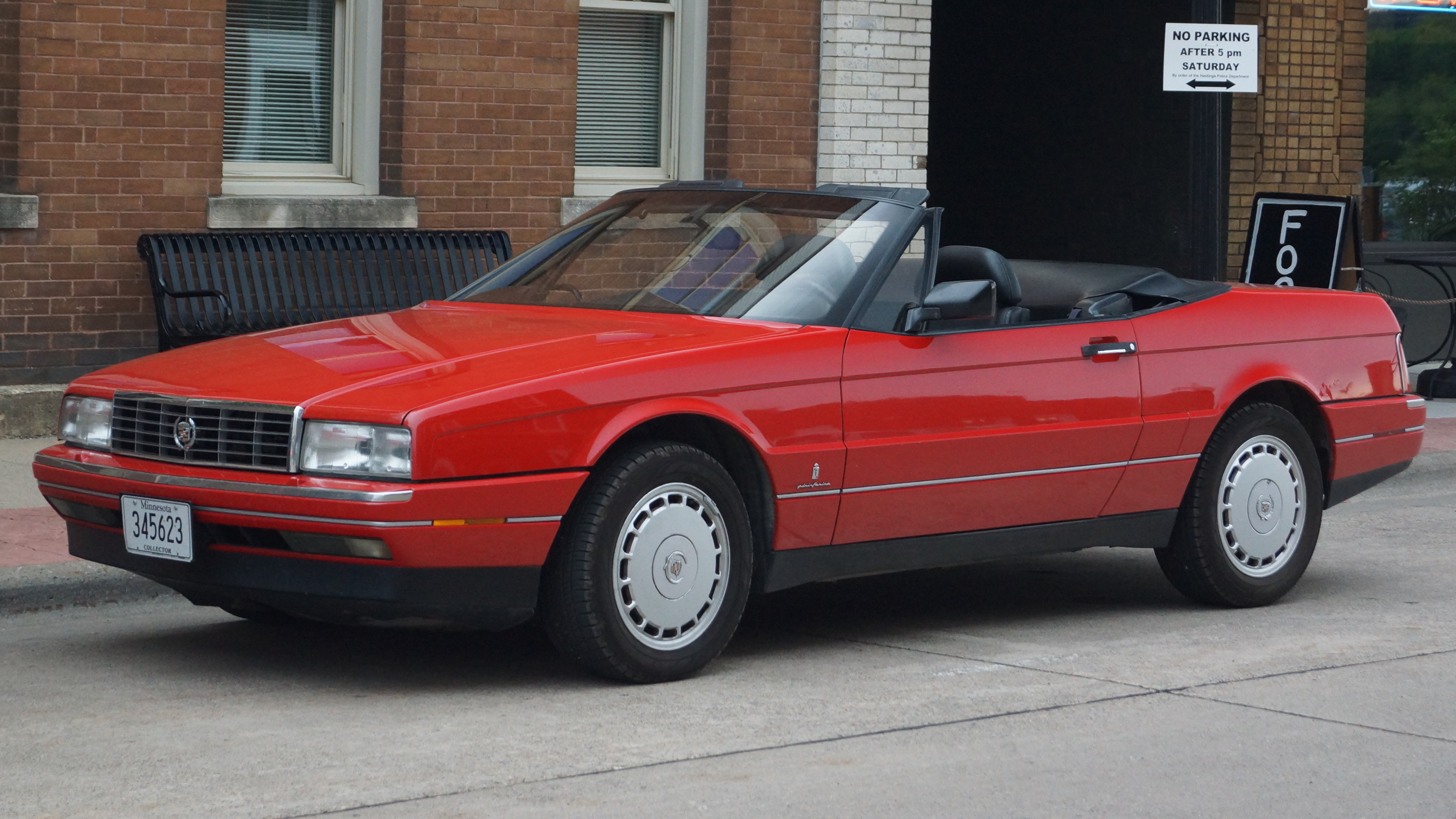
Cadillac Allanté

After the war, Italy was banned from the 1946 Paris Motor Show. The Paris show was attended by 809,000 visitors (twice the pre-war figure), and queues stretched from the main gate to the Seine. Pinin Farina and his son Sergio, determined to defy the ban, drove two of their cars (an Alfa Romeo 6C 2500 S and a Lancia Aprilia cabriolet) from Turin to Paris and found a place at the entrance to the exhibition to display the two new creations. The managers of the Grand Palais said of the display, "the devil Pinin Farina", but to the press and the public, it was the successful "Turin coachbuilder's anti-salon".

At the end of 1945, the Cisitalia 202 Coupé was designed. An elegantly proportioned design with a low hood, it is the car that usually is given credit for establishing Pinin Farina's reputation. The Pinin Farina design was honored in the Museum of Modern Art's landmark presentation "Eight Automobiles" in 1951. A total of 170 Coupés were produced by Pinin Farina.

The publicity of the Museum of Modern Art exhibit brought Pinin Farina to the attention of Nash-Kelvinator managers. The subsequent cooperation with Nash Motors resulted in high-volume production of Pinin Farina designs and provided a significant entry into the United States market. In 1952, Farina visited the U.S. for the unveiling of his design for the Nash Ambassador and Statesman lines, which, although they did carry some details of Pinin Farina's design, were primarily designed by Nash's then-new in-house styling staff when the original Farina-designed model proved unsuited to American tastes, exhibiting a popular 1950s appearance called "ponton". The Nash-Healey sports car body was, however, completely designed and assembled with Nash drivetrains in limited numbers from 1952 until 1954 at Pinin Farina's Turin facilities. Nash heavily advertised its link to the famous Italian designer, much as Studebaker promoted its longtime association with Raymond Loewy. As a result of Nash's million-dollar advertising campaign, Pinin Farina became well known in the U.S.

Pinin Farina also built the bodies for the limited-series Cadillac Eldorado Brougham for General Motors in 1959 and 1960. They were assembled in Italy and shipped back to the U.S. There were 99 Broughams built in 1959 and 101 in 1960. A similar arrangement was repeated in the late 1980s when Pininfarina designed (and partially assembled) the Cadillac Allanté at the San Giusto Canavese factory. The car bodies were assembled and painted in Italy before being flown from the Turin International Airport to Detroit for final vehicle assembly.

=== Ferrari partnership ===
It started in 1951 with a meeting at a restaurant in Tortona, a small town halfway between Turin and Modena. This neutral territory was chosen because neither Farina nor Enzo Ferrari wanted to meet at the other's headquarters. Battista's son, Sergio Pininfarina recalled, "It is not difficult to imagine how I felt that afternoon when my father, without taking his eyes off the road for one moment, told me his decision as we drove back to Turin: "From now on you'll be looking after Ferrari, from A to Z. Design, engineering, technology, construction—the lot!"—I was over the moon with happiness."

Since that meeting, a 61-year relationship endured where the only road-going production Ferrari not designed by Pininfarina was the 1973 Dino 308 GT4. Their relationship was so close that Pininfarina became a partner of Ferrari in "Scuderia Ferrari SpA SEFAC", the organization that ran Ferrari's race team from 1961 until 1989, Pinin was a vice president of Ferrari, and Sergio later sat on Ferrari's board of directors.

However, this special relationship came to an end with the 2012-17 Ferrari F12berlinetta, the last model entirely penned by Pininfarina, while Centro Stile Ferrari has designed each car since 2013's LaFerrari.

=== Large-scale manufacturing ===
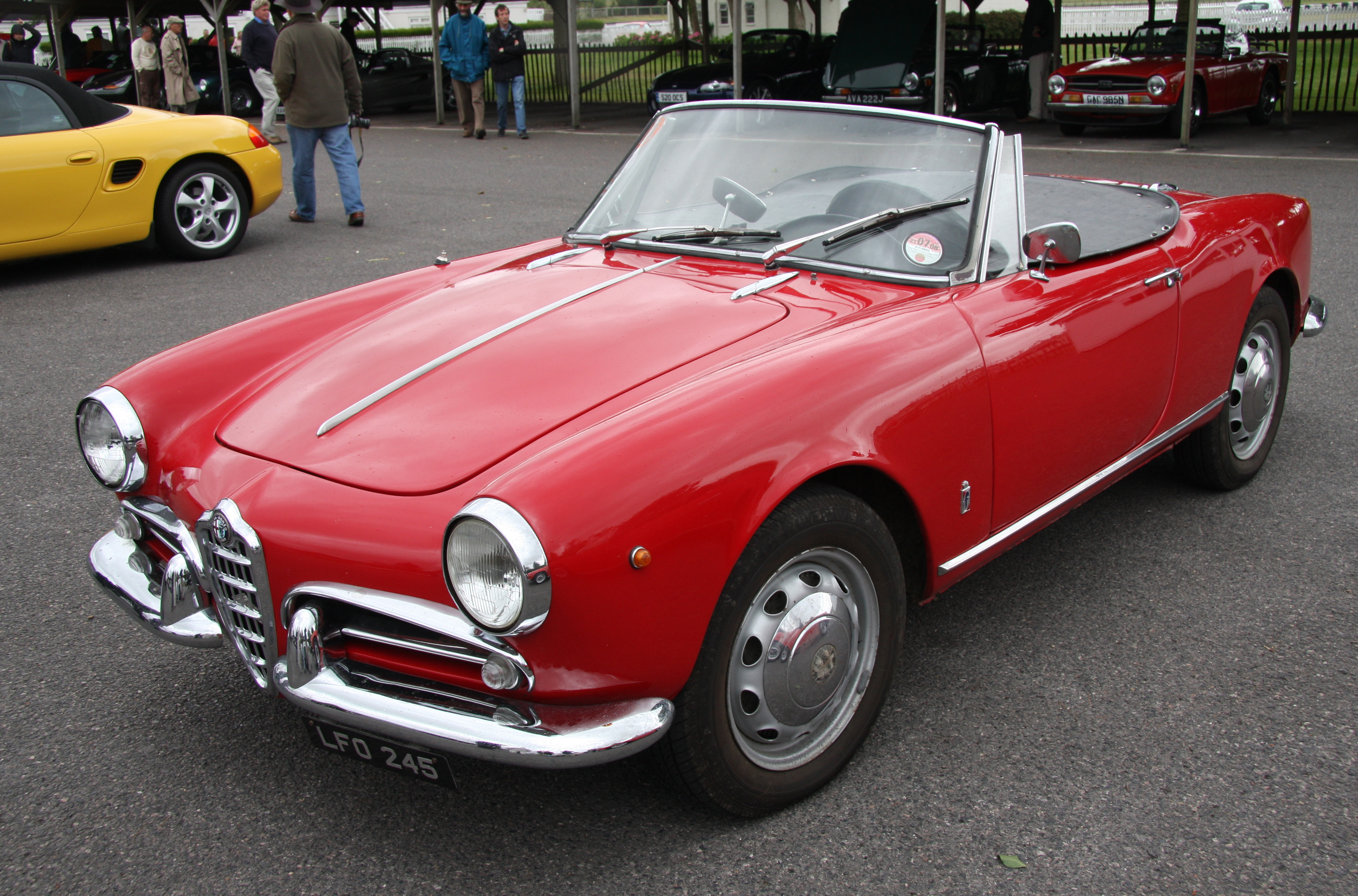
Alfa Romeo Giulietta Spider

From 1954 until 1955, Pinin Farina purchased land in Grugliasco, outside Turin, for a new factory. "The factory in no way would look like the one of Corso Trapani. It would be a car no longer on my measurements but those of my children, built looking like them; I had this in mind and wanted it," said Farina.

Around the same time, Alfa Romeo accepted Pininfarina's design over Bertone for the new Giulietta Spider. The Alfa was the first vehicle that Pinin Farina produced in large numbers. Alfa Romeo chose Pinin Farina to make the Spider mainly because they felt confident they could produce 20 cars daily for a run of 1,000 bodies. The Spider was a massive success for Alfa Romeo and Pinin Farina. Max Hoffman, the importer for the United States, said he could sell as many as they could make. In 1958, the first year of production, they produced 1,025 units, which then expanded to over 4,000 units in 1959, the first full year of the new Grugliasco factory.

=== Second generation of leadership ===
Starting with planning the new plant in Grugliasco in 1956, Farina began to groom his replacements–Sergio, his son, and Renzo Carli, his son-in-law. To his heirs apparent, Farina said of the Corso Trapani facility, "This old plant has reached the limits of its growth. It has no room for expansion and is far from being up to date. If I were alone, I'd leave it as it is. But I want you to decide which way to go–to stay as we are or to enlarge. Either way is fine with me. It's your decision, and I don't want to know what it is. I'm finished, and it's your time to take over. The future is absolutely up to you." In 1958, upon leaving for a world tour, Farina added, "In my family, we inherit our legacies from live people–not from the dead."

==== Change of corporate name to Pininfarina ====
In 1961, at 68, "Pinin" Farina formally turned his firm over to his son, Sergio, and his son-in-law, Renzo Carli. The same year, the President of Italy formally authorized the change of Farina's last name to Pininfarina, and the business took on the same name.

Pininfarina was run by Battista's grandson Andrea Pininfarina from 2001 until he died in 2008. Andrea's younger brother Paolo Pininfarina was appointed successor. Paolo died in April 2024.

=== Modernizing for a new world ===
Starting in the mid-1960s, Pininfarina started investing in the science of automotive design, a strategy to differentiate itself from the other Italian coachbuilders.

In 1966, Pininfarina opened the Studies and Research Centre (Studi e Ricerche) in Grugliasco. The research centre occupied 8,000 sq. metres (2 acres) and employed 180 technicians to produce 25 prototypes yearly.

The Calculation and Design Centre was set up in 1967, the first step in the process of technological evolution that, during the 1970s, would take Pininfarina into the lead in automated bodywork design.

Then, in 1972, construction of a full-sized wind tunnel was completed. The project was started in 1966. When it opened, it was the first wind tunnel with the ability to test full-sized cars in Italy and one of the first in the world with this ability. For example, GM's full-sized wind tunnel did not open until 1980.

=== New infrastructure and expansion ===
The 1980s started a period of expansion for Pininfarina.

In 1982, the company opened "Pininfarina Studi e Ricerche" in Cambiano. It was separate from the factory and wind tunnel in Grugliasco to keep design and research activities independent from manufacturing. On 14 October 2002, Pininfarina inaugurated a new engineering centre. The new facility, built at the Cambiano campus, gave greater visibility and independence to the engineering operations.

In 1983, Pininfarina reached an agreement with General Motors to design and build the Cadillac Allanté. The Allanté project led to the building of the San Giorgio factory in 1985.

In 1996, Mitsubishi entered into talks for Pininfarina to build their new compact SUV, the Pajero, in Italy. While Mitsubishi recognized Pininfarina's expertise in design and engineering, the reason for choosing them was that manufacturing costs were half of those in Germany. After entering into an agreement in 1996, Pininfarina purchased an industrial site at Bairo Canavese near Turin, Italy. in April 1997, Bairo Canavese was dedicated to the production of the new Mitsubishi Pajero Pinin.

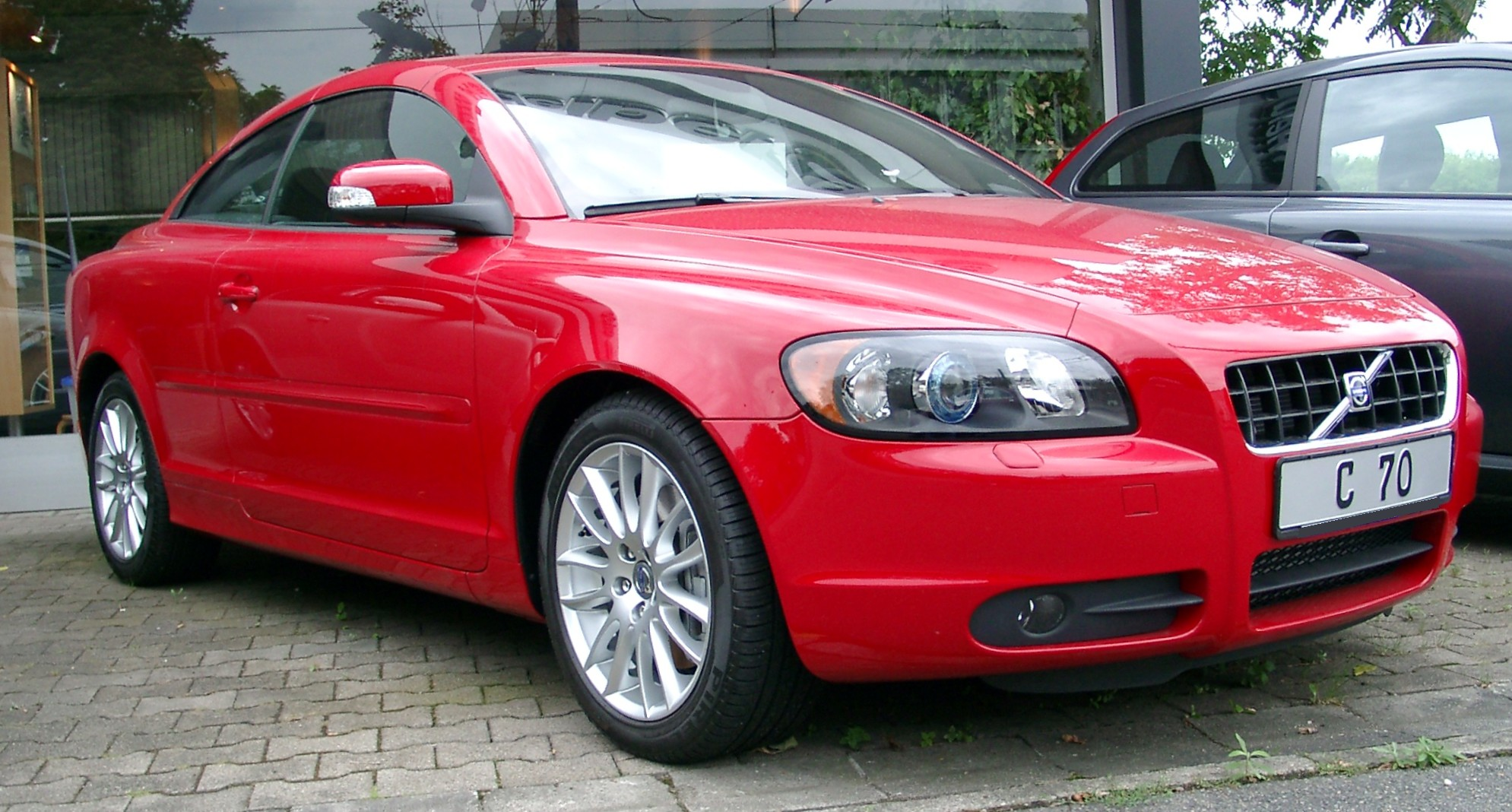
2006 Volvo C70

Pininfarina Sverige AB in Uddevalla, Sweden, was established in 2003 as a joint venture (JV) between Volvo Cars and Pininfarina to produce a new Volvo convertible that would be sold in Europe and the United States. The JV was owned 60% by Pininfarina and 40% by Volvo. The C70 model, designed by Volvo's John Kinsey, was launched on 13 April 2006, sharing the Volvo P1 platform used in the S40. In 2011, Volvo announced the end of the joint venture, becoming the sole owner of the Uddevalla plant. Shortly thereafter, Volvo announced that the plant would be closed down, with the last car being built in the first half of 2013.

=== Architecture ===
Pininfarina has helped to plan multi-family residences with Cyrela Real Estate. Related Group, and commercial projects with Bosque Real, Roadside Development, and Higold Group. They were also involved in the construction of the Istanbul and Santiago international airports and Juventus Arena. In 2016 Pininfarina, in collaboration with Reflex, created the Segno furniture Collection; an integrated modular system. They have also collaborated with Italian wood distributor Corà Parquet, to develop wooden flooring surfaces as well as Higold on a line of outdoor furniture.

== Debt and restructure ==
In April 2008, after three years of serious losses totaling €115 million at the end of 2007, Pininfarina made the first of several moves to raise capital and restructure its enormous debt.

On 29 April 2008 Pininfarina announced Piero Ferrari, Alberto Bombassei (chairman of Brembo), and the Marsiaj family (founders of the Sabelt seatbelt company), would join with Vincent Bolloré, a French financier, and Ratan Tata, head of India's Tata Group, Pininfarina's main client in India at the time, who already announced their plans to invest, to together invest €100 million. Funding would come through the sale of stock to other investors. The Pininfarina family was willing to reduce its share from 55% to 30%, which would still be enough to secure a controlling interest. On 31 December 2008, Pininfarina announced a debt restructuring that would require the family to sell its stake in the company. The agreement was made after Pininfarina's value dropped 67% during 2008, with a market capitalization of about €36 million. It had a total debt of €598 million at the end of November. Of that amount, €555 million was the subject of the debt restructuring agreement that was agreed on with a consortium of banks. Pincar, Pininfarina's family holding company, announced on 24 March 2009 that it had hired investment bank Leonardo & Co. to find a buyer for its 50.6% stake in Pininfarina per the debt restructuring agreement reached in December. In a statement released on 15 February 2012, the company said its debt repayment date had been extended to 2018, from 2015, and that the company would take advantage of interest rates "significantly lower than [current] market rates". Pininfarina will remain under the control of the Pininfarina family. Pininfarina also saw its net revenue increase by a million.

In 2010 Pininfarina Automotive Engineering (Shanghai) Co., Ltd was founded in Jiading by Silvio Angori with Michele Straniero serving as first General Manager supporting and expanding technical collaborations with main Chinese OEM's including Chery, JAC, SAIC and FAW Tianjin.

In 2013, Pininfarina managed a net profit with an operating loss of €8.2 million but a net profit of €32.9 million from a one-time gain of approximately €45 million.

=== Acquisition by Mahindra Group (2015–present) ===
Mahindra Group, owner of Indian automobile company Mahindra & Mahindra, agreed to buy Italian car designer Pininfarina SpA in a deal worth about €168 million.

Mahindra Group, together with affiliate Tech Mahindra, has a 76% stake in the holding company Pincar for €25.3 million. The Indian company will offer the same price for the remaining stock. In addition to buying stock, Mahindra will invest €20 million in Pininfarina and provide a guarantee to creditors of €114.5 million.

== Corporate governance (2016) ==
- President: Paolo Pininfarina
- CEO – General Manager: Silvio Pietro Angori
- Board of Directors: Gianfranco Albertini, Edoardo Garrone, Romina Guglielmetti, Licia Mattioli, Enrico Paraffini, Carlo Pavesio, Roberto Testore.
- Statutory Auditors: Nicola Treves (president), Margherita Spaini, Giovanni Rayneri.

== Car production operations ==
On 10 December 2011, Pininfarina announced it would end all automotive production. In truth, production ended in November 2010 with the conclusion of the contract to produce the Alfa Romeo Brera and Spider at the San Giorgio plant.

=== Grugliasco factory ===
Opened in 1958 with nearly 1,000 employees, by 1960 output exceeded 11,000 car bodies. In 2009, Pininfarina sold the factory to Finpiemonte, the public finance of the Piedmont Region, at the price of 14.4 million euros. Finpiemonte, as part of the deal, leases the plant to Gian Mario Rossignolo at a rent per year for six years, renewable.

The Grugliasco sale did not include an adjacent structure that houses the wind tunnel.

=== San Giorgio plant ===
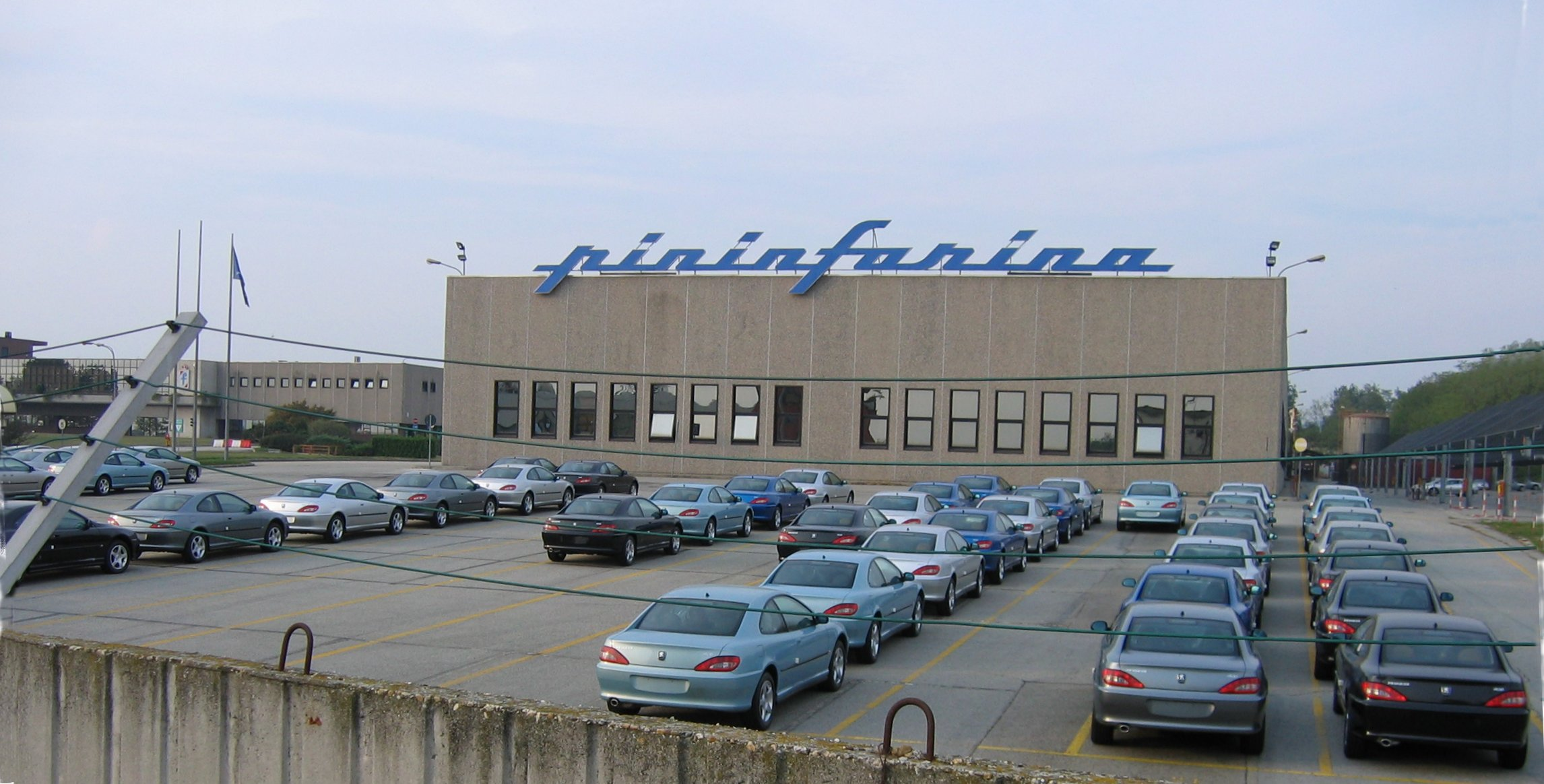
Pininfarina factory producing the Peugeot 406 Coupé in San Giorgio Canavese, near Turin

Opened in 1986 to build Cadillac Allante bodies for General Motors, the same year Pininfarina was first listed on the Stock Exchange in Milan. Automotive production ended at San Giorgio with the conclusion of the Ford production in July 2010 and the Alfa Romeo production in November 2010.

Following the end of contract manufacturing activities, San Giorgio Canavese is being used to produce spare parts for cars manufactured in the past.

=== Bairo Canavese ===
Pininfarina opened its third manufacturing plant in 1997. Currently, Pininfarina leases the plant and 57 employees to the Cecomp Group. This agreement to produce 4,000 electric Bolloré Bluecars runs from 1 April 2011 to 31 December 2013. On 13 September 2013, a new lease agreement was announced; this new agreement will run from 1 January 2014 until the end of 2016.

=== Uddevalla, Sweden Pininfarina Sverige AB ===
A joint venture between Pininfarina S.p.A. and Volvo Car Corporation began in 2003. Volvo and Pininfarina S.p.A. have agreed to terminate the joint venture agreement regarding Pininfarina Sverige AB and its operations in Uddevalla, Sweden. As of 31 December 2011, the termination of this agreement would result in a 30 million euros fee paid to Pininfarina.

On 25 June 2013, the last Volvo C70 was produced, and the Uddevalla assembly plant was closed.

== Notable designers ==
Although Pininfarina rarely gave credit to individuals, many of the designers of the past have become known. That policy seems to have changed in recent years. As of 2021, Pininfarina had more than 700 employees.

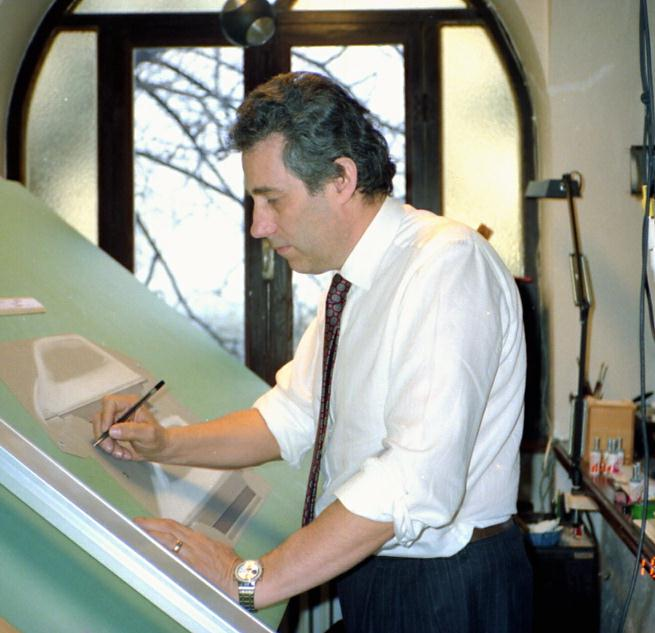
Paolo Martin at work

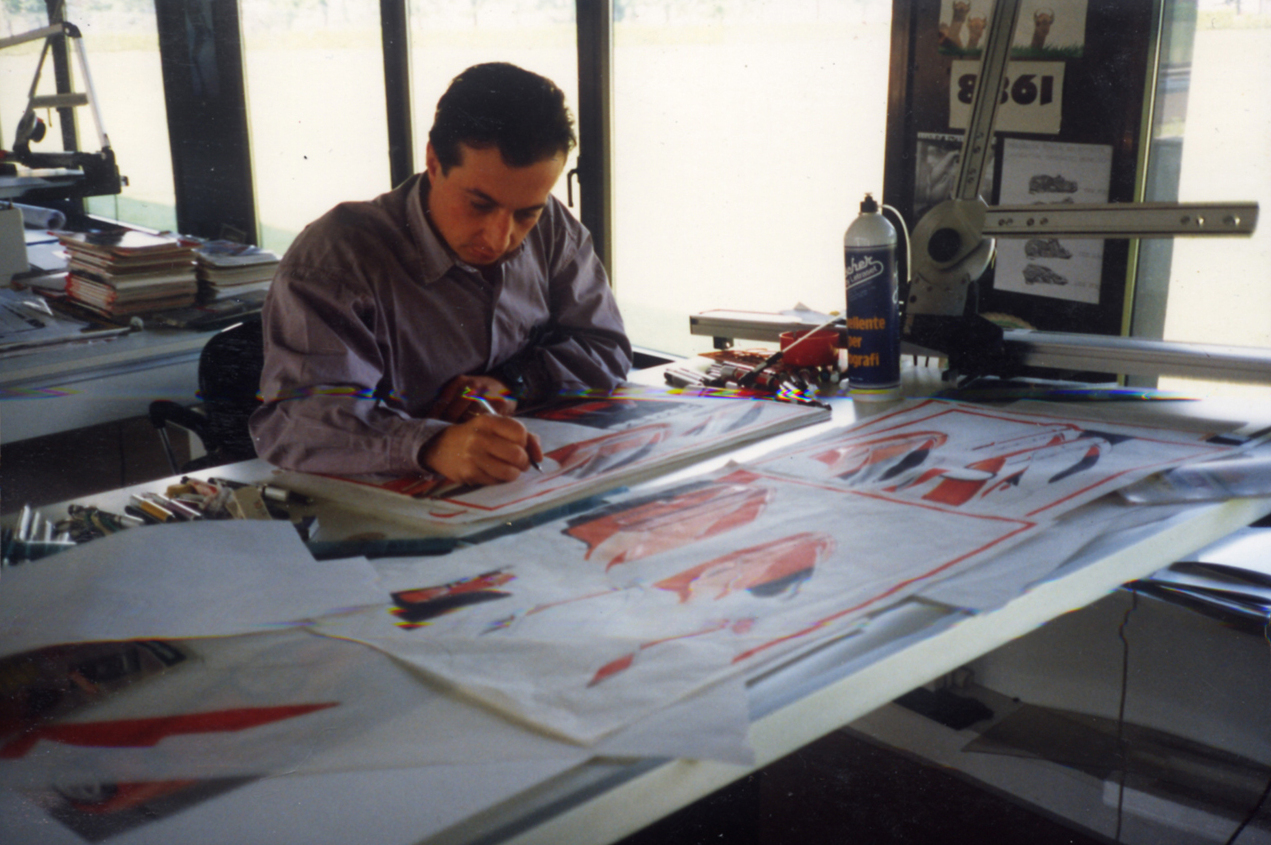
Pietro Camardella drawing the Ferrari Mythos

- Battista Pininfarina
- Franco Scaglione 1951, designer for two months before he left for what is now known as Gruppo Bertone
- Franco Martinengo 1952–72, director of the Centro Stile
- Adriano Rabbone 1950s, Ferrari Inter, Lancia B24, Nash-Healey Pininfarina
- Francesco Salomone 1940s–1960s, chief designer and head of studio. Lancia B24, Ferrari 275 GTB
- Aldo Brovarone 1954–74, designer; 1974–88, managing director Studi e Ricerche
- Tom Tjaarda 1961–65, designer
- Filippo Sapino 1967–69; Abarth 2000, Ferrari 512S concept, Ferrari 365 GTC/4.
- Paolo Martin 1968–72, chief of the Styling Department; Ferrari Modulo
- Diego Ottina 1970–; Ferrari Pinin, Ferrari Testarossa, Alfa Romeo Vivace Coupé and Spider.
- Lorenzo Ramaciotti 1973–2005 deputy director of Pininfarina Studi e Ricerche, director general and chief designer, CEO of Pininfarina SpA Research and Development
- Guido Campoli 1970s–1980s; Ferrari Testarossa
- Ian Cameron 1975–1981; Ferrari Testarossa (1985)
- Pierangelo Andreani 1972–76; Ferrari Mondial
- Enrico Fumia 1976–91; 1982: manager at Pininfarina R&D – Models and Prototypes Development; 1988: manager at Pininfarina R&D – design and development; 1989: deputy general manager at Pininfarina R&D
- Emanuele Nicosia 1977–85; Ferrari Testarossa
- Elvio D'Aprile 1982–1995; Ferrari 550 Maranello
- Pietro Camardella 1984–93; Ferrari F40, 512 TR, F50, Mythos, 456 GT
- Marco Tencone 1988–1992
- Leonardo Fioravanti 1988–91, managing director and CEO of Pininfarina Studi e Ricerche.
- Maurizio Corbi 1989–present senior designer. Ferrari F50, F355, 550 Maranello
- Davide Arcangeli 1990s; Peugeot 406 Coupé, Honda Argento Vivo.
- Goran Popović 1993–2011; Ferrari 360 Modena
- Jeremy Malick 2000–2002, designer; 2009–2016, senior designer
- Dimitri Vicedomini 2001–2012, senior car designer
- Jason Castriota 2001–2008; Ferrari P4/5 by Pininfarina, Ferrari 599, Maserati GranTurismo.
- Ken Okuyama 2004–2006, creative director
- Luca Borgogno 2005–2015, lead designer, Ferrari Sergio, Sp03, New Stratos, Pininfarina Battista.
- Nazzareno Epifani 2006–present, head of exterior design. Pininfarina Sintesi, Alfa Romeo 2uettottanta, Ferrari 458 Spider, Pininfarina Cambiano, Ferrari SP12 EC, Hybrid Kinetik H600, Automobili Pininfarina Battista, Karma GT by Pininfarina
- Lowie Vermeersch 2007–10, design director.
- Brano Mauks 2007–2014, senior designer. Ferrari Sergio.
- Carlo Palazzani 2005–2014, lead designer; Ferrari 458
- Felix Kilbertus 2011–2014, lead designer
- Fabio Filippini 2011–2016, vice president design and chief creative officer
- Rustom Mazda 2011–present, 2021–present head of exterior design.
- Carlo Bonzanigo 2017–present, senior vice president, design, 1995–2004 design project manager. Maserati GranTurismo, Citroën Osée Concept, Ford Start Concept
- Kevin. M. Rice 2020–2022, chief creative officer.

== Vehicles ==
Pininfarina designs, manufactures, assembles, and tests prototypes and production vehicles under contract for other automakers.

=== Past production ===
As of 10 December 2011, Pininfarina announced it would end all mass automotive production with the sale of its 40% stake in the Uddevalla, Sweden plant to Volvo in 2013. In the past, Pininfarina produced cars and car bodies under contract from other automakers. This production includes Pininfarina-designed cars and vehicles designed by others.

Cars and car bodies manufactured at Pininfarina factories
Years	Model	Factory	Quantity
1946–1949	Maserati A6 1500 Turismo	107 Corso Trapani	58
1947–1952	Cisitalia 202	107 Corso Trapani	170
1947–1951	Alfa Romeo 6C 2500 Super Cabriolet	107 Corso Trapani	64
1948–1951	Alfa Romeo 6C 2500 Super Sport Cabriolet	107 Corso Trapani	25–30
1948–1951	Alfa Romeo 6C 2500 S Berlina	107 Corso Trapani	80
1948	Maserati A6 1500 Spider	107 Corso Trapani	2
1950–1952	Lancia Aurelia B50 Cabriolet	107 Corso Trapani	265
1950–1958	Lancia Aurelia B20 Coupé	107 Corso Trapani	2,640
1952	Alfa Romeo 6C 2500 Sport	107 Corso Trapani	3
1952	Alfa Romeo 1900 C Cabriolet	107 Corso Trapani	88
1952–1953	Alfa Romeo 1900 C Coupé	107 Corso Trapani	100
1952–1953	Ferrari 212 Inter cabriolet	107 Corso Trapani	2
1952–1953	Ferrari 212 Inter coupé	107 Corso Trapani	11
1952–1953	Lancia D20 coupé	107 Corso Trapani	7
1952–1954	Nash-Healey	107 Corso Trapani	402
1953	Ferrari 375 MM Spider	107 Corso Trapani	15
1953	Lancia D23 Spyder	107 Corso Trapani	4 (re-bodied D20s)
1953–1954	Lancia D24 Spyder	107 Corso Trapani	6
1954–1955	Ferrari 250 Europa GT	107 Corso Trapani	28
1954–1957	Fiat 1100 TV Coupé	107 Corso Trapani	126
1954–1955	Lancia Aurelia B24 Spider America	107 Corso Trapani	240
1954	Lancia D25 Spyder	107 Corso Trapani	4 (re-bodied D24s)
1954	Maserati A6 GCS/53 Berlinetta	107 Corso Trapani	4
1956	Lancia Aurelia B24 Spider	107 Corso Trapani	521
1956–1958	Alfa Romeo Giulietta Spider	107 Corso Trapani	5,493
1957–1959	Lancia Appia Pinin Farina Coupé 2 +2 Series II	–	302
1958–1960	Ferrari 250 GT Coupé Pinin Farina	Grugliasco	353
1959–1962	Alfa Romeo Giulietta Spider	Grugliasco	11,503
1959–1960	Cadillac Eldorado Brougham	Grugliasco	200
1959–1967	Lancia Flaminia Coupé	Grugliasco	5,236
1960–1963	Ferrari 250 GTE 2+2	Grugliasco	955 including prototypes
1961–1968	Peugeot 404 Coupé and Cabriolet	Grugliasco	17,223 (10,389 Cabriolets, 6,834 Coupés)
1962–1971	Lancia Flavia Coupé	Grugliasco	26,084
1962–1965	Alfa Romeo Giulia 1600 Spider	Grugliasco	10,336
1963	Ferrari 330 America	Grugliasco	50
1964–1967	Ferrari 330 GT 2+2	Grugliasco	1080
1966–1968	Alfa Romeo Giulia Spider Duetto 1600 Spider	Grugliasco	6,322
1966–1968	Ferrari 330 GTC	Grugliasco	604
1966–1968	Ferrari 330 GTS	Grugliasco	100
1966–1985	Fiat 124 Sport Spider	Grugliasco	198,120
1966–1972	Fiat Dino Spider	Grugliasco	1,583
1967	Ferrari 330 GTC Coupé Speciale	Grugliasco	3
1968–1972	Alfa Romeo Giulia Spider 1300 and 1600 Junior	Grugliasco	4,913
1968–1972	Alfa Romeo 1750 Spider Veloce	Grugliasco	8,920
1969–1983	Peugeot 504 Coupé	Grugliasco	22,975
1969–1983	Peugeot 504 Cabriolet	Grugliasco	8,191
1971–1972	Ferrari 365 GTC/4	Grugliasco	505
1971–1975	Lancia 2000 Coupé	Grugliasco	–
1971–1976	Fiat 130 Coupé	Grugliasco	4,491
1974–1981	Lancia Beta Montecarlo Cabrio	Grugliasco	4,375
1975–1981	Lancia Beta Montecarlo Coupé	Grugliasco	3,203
1976–1984	Lancia Gamma Coupé	Grugliasco	6,790
1976–1985	Ferrari 400	Grugliasco	1,808
1981–1984	Lancia Beta Coupé HPE	Grugliasco	18,917
1981	Lancia 037	Grugliasco	220
1981–1985	Peugeot Talbot Samba Cabriolet	Grugliasco	13,062
1981–1986	Fiat Campagnola	Grugliasco	15,198
1984–1993	Ferrari Testarossa	Grugliasco / San Giorgio	–
1984–1986	Alfa Romeo 33 Giardinetta	Grugliasco	12,238
1984–1993	Peugeot 205 Cabriolet	Grugliasco	72,125
1985–1989	Ferrari 412 & 412 GT	Grugliasco	576
1986–1993	Cadillac Allanté	San Giorgio Canavese	21,430
1992–1996	Ferrari 456 GT	–	1435
1993–2000	Fiat Coupé	–	72,762
1993–2002	Peugeot 306 Cabriolet	San Giorgio Canavese	77,824
1996–1999	Bentley Azure Mark I Convertible	–	895
1996–2000	Lancia Kappa SW	–	9,208
1996–2004	Peugeot 406 Coupé	San Giorgio Canavese	107,633
1999–2005	Mitsubishi Pajero Pinin	Bairo Canavese and Grugliasco	68,555
2000–2004	Alfa Romeo GTV & Spider 916 series	San Giorgio Canavese	15,788
2002	Pininfarina Argento Vivo	–	4–5
2002–2005	Ford Streetka	Bairo Canavese	37,076
2005	Ferrari P4/5 by Pininfarina	–	1
2005–2010	Alfa Romeo Brera	San Giorgio Canavese	21,786
2006–2010	Alfa Romeo Spider	San Giorgio Canavese	12,488
2006–2010	Ford Focus Coupé Cabriolet	Bairo Canavese	36,374
2006–2013	Volvo C70 II	Uddevalla, Sweden	–
2006–2008	Mitsubishi Colt CZC	Bairo Canavese	16,695

=== Notable car designs ===
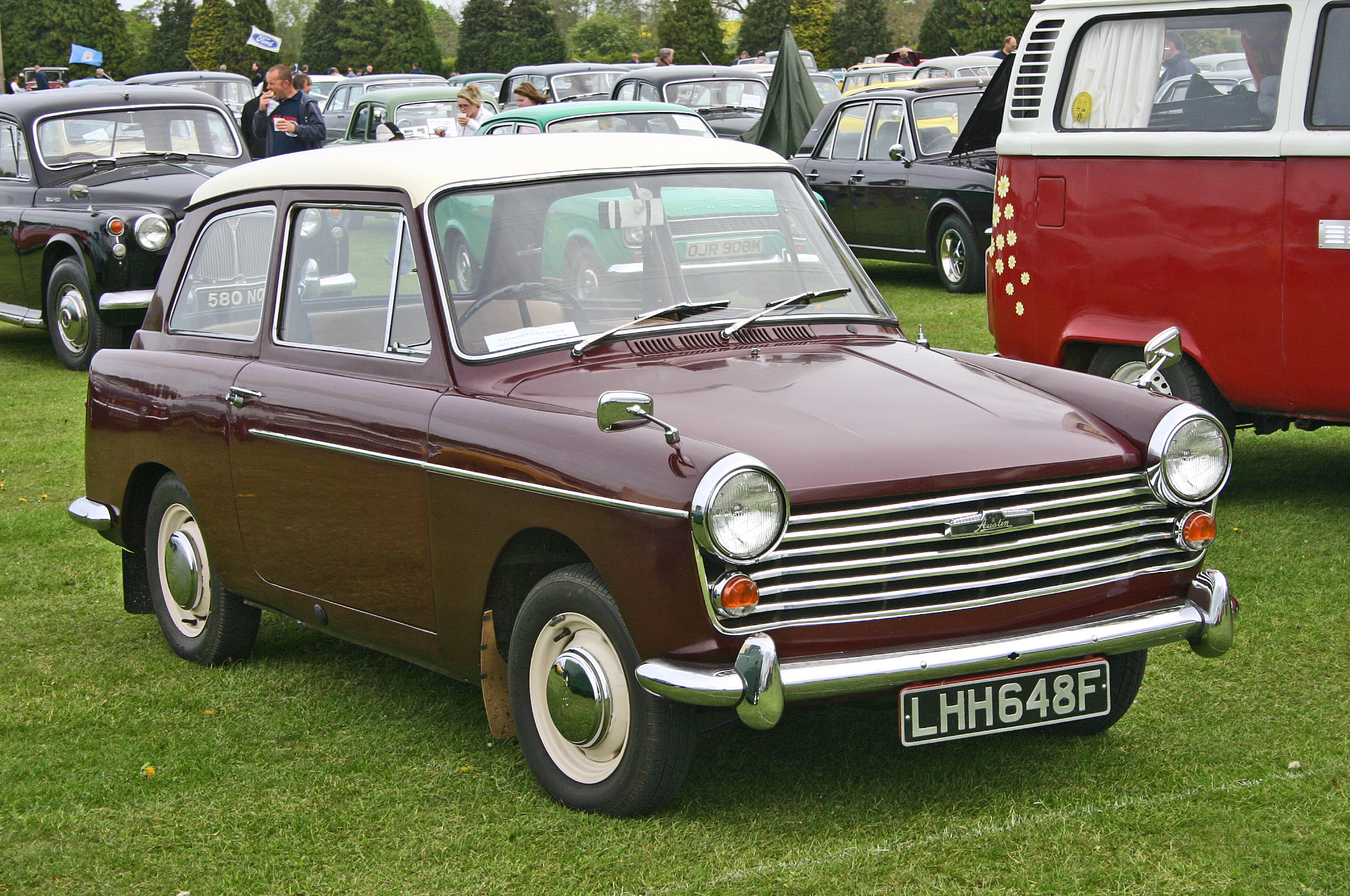
1961 Austin A40 Farina Mk II

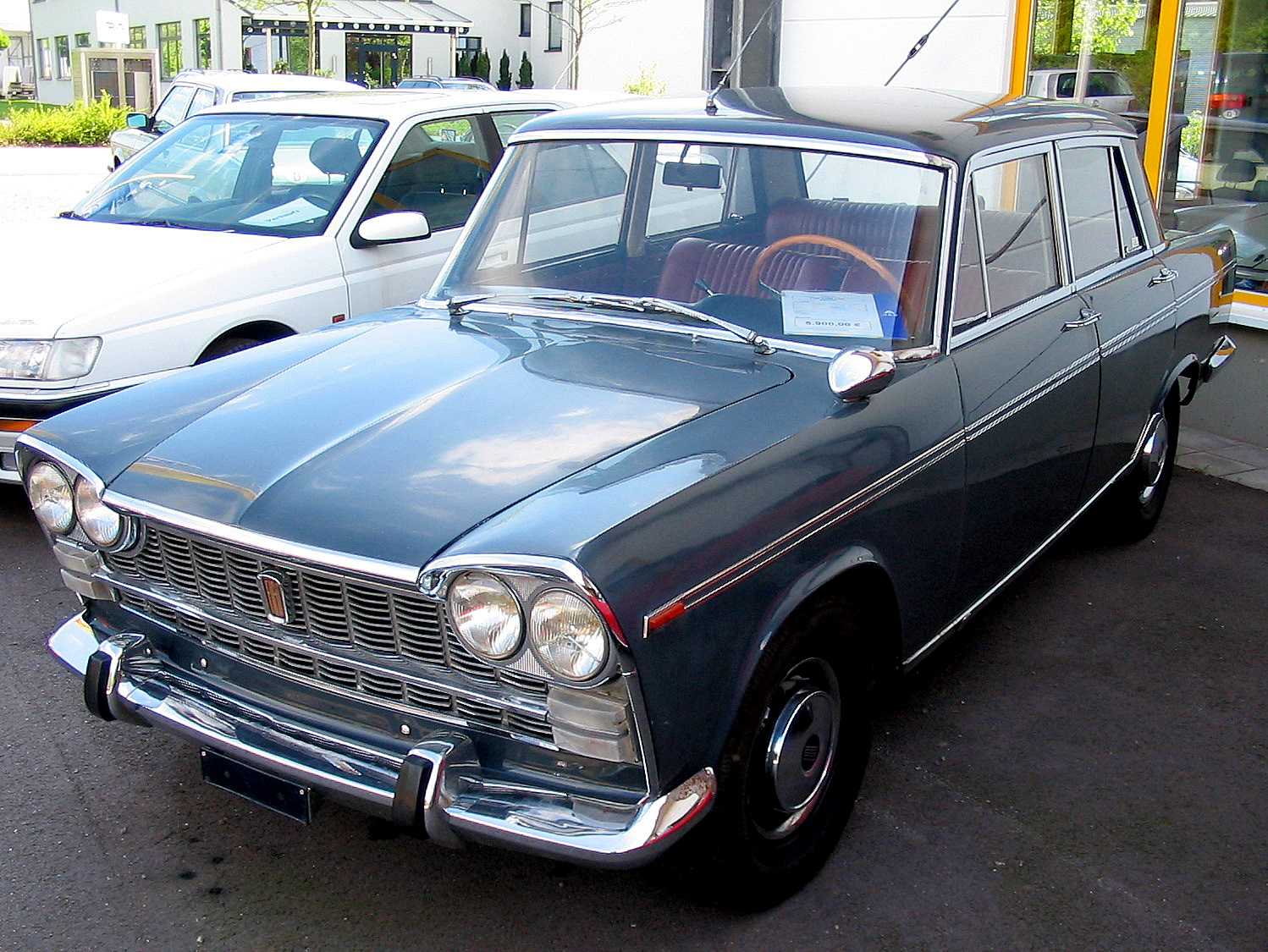
1961 Fiat 2300

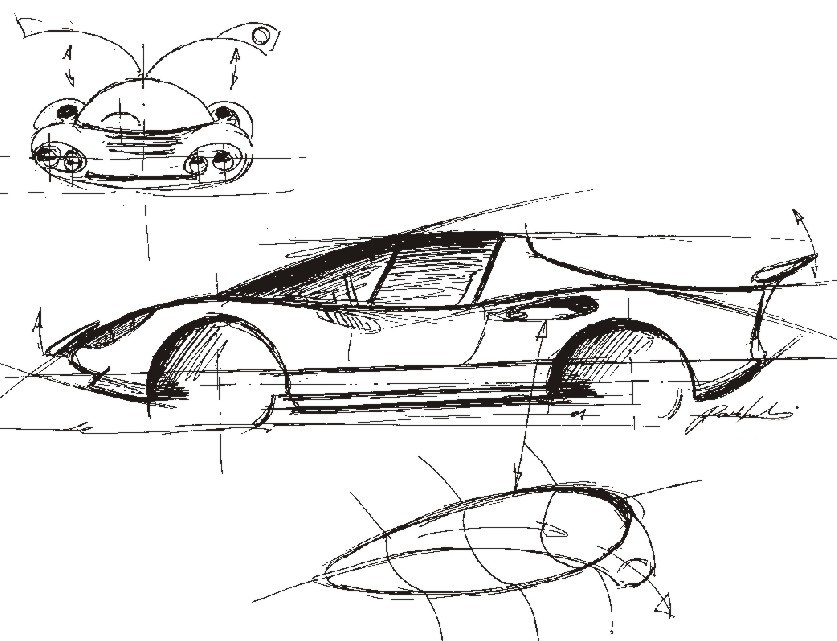
Dino Berlinetta Competizione

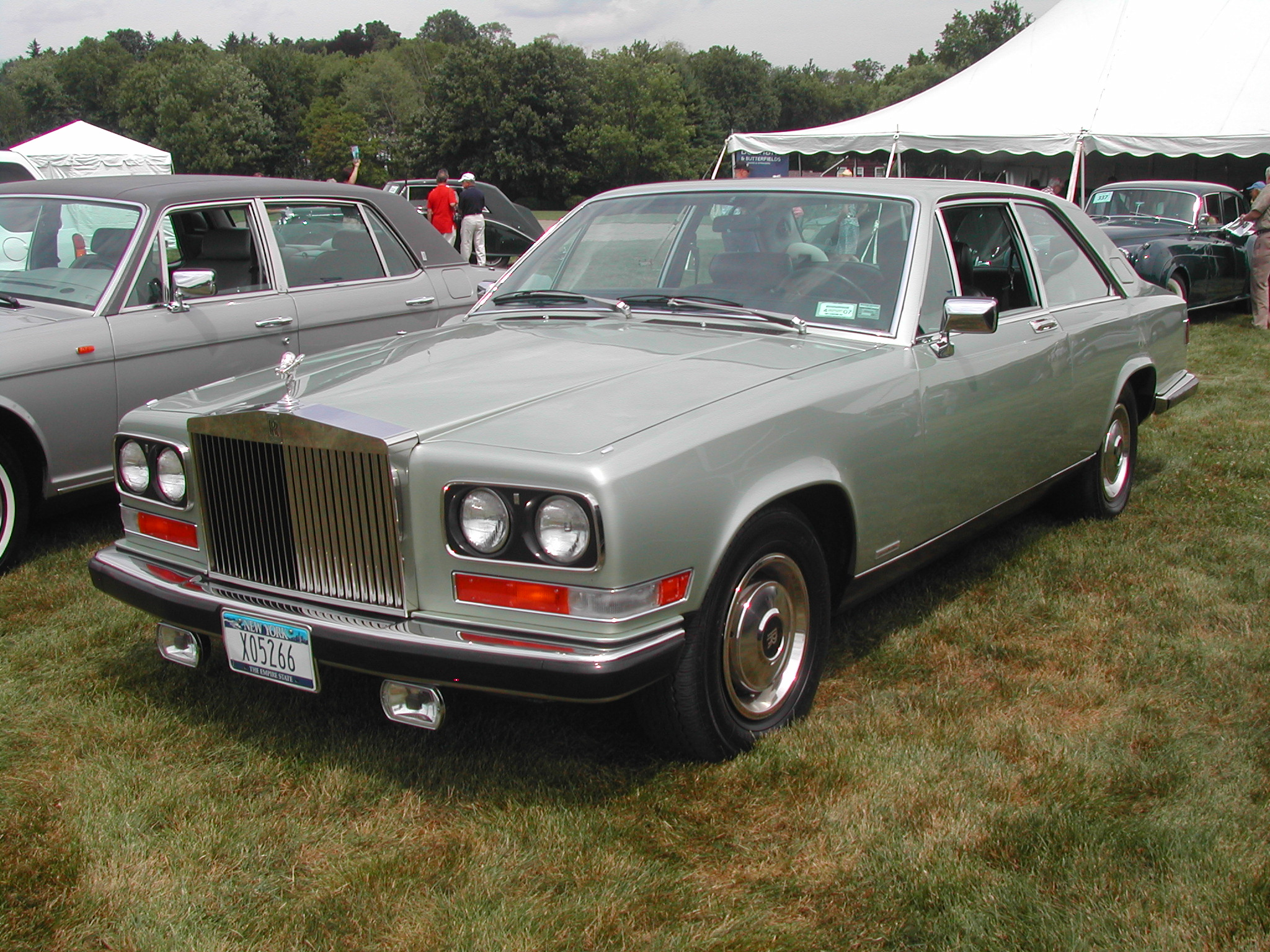
1982 Rolls-Royce Camargue

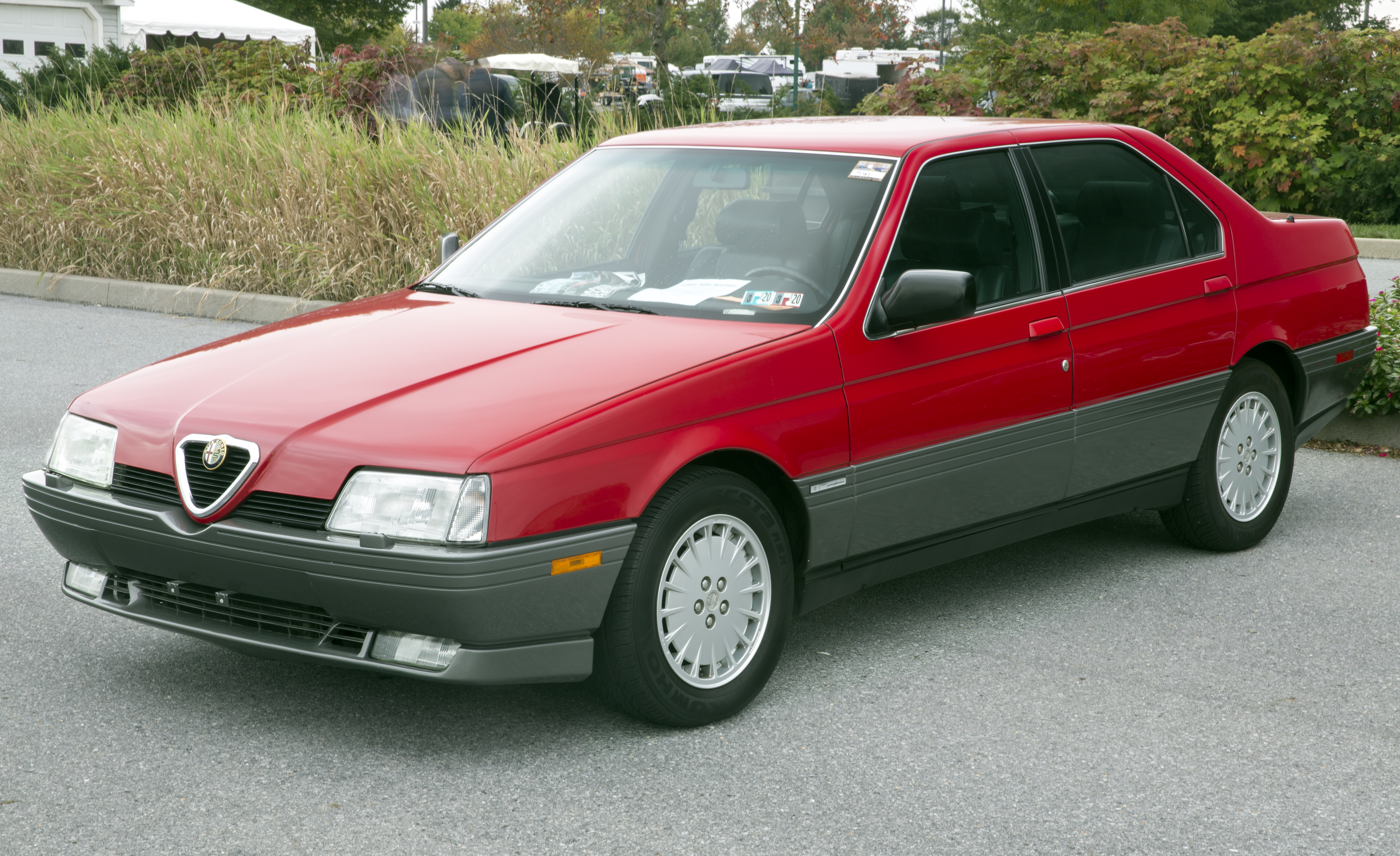
1987 Alfa Romeo 164

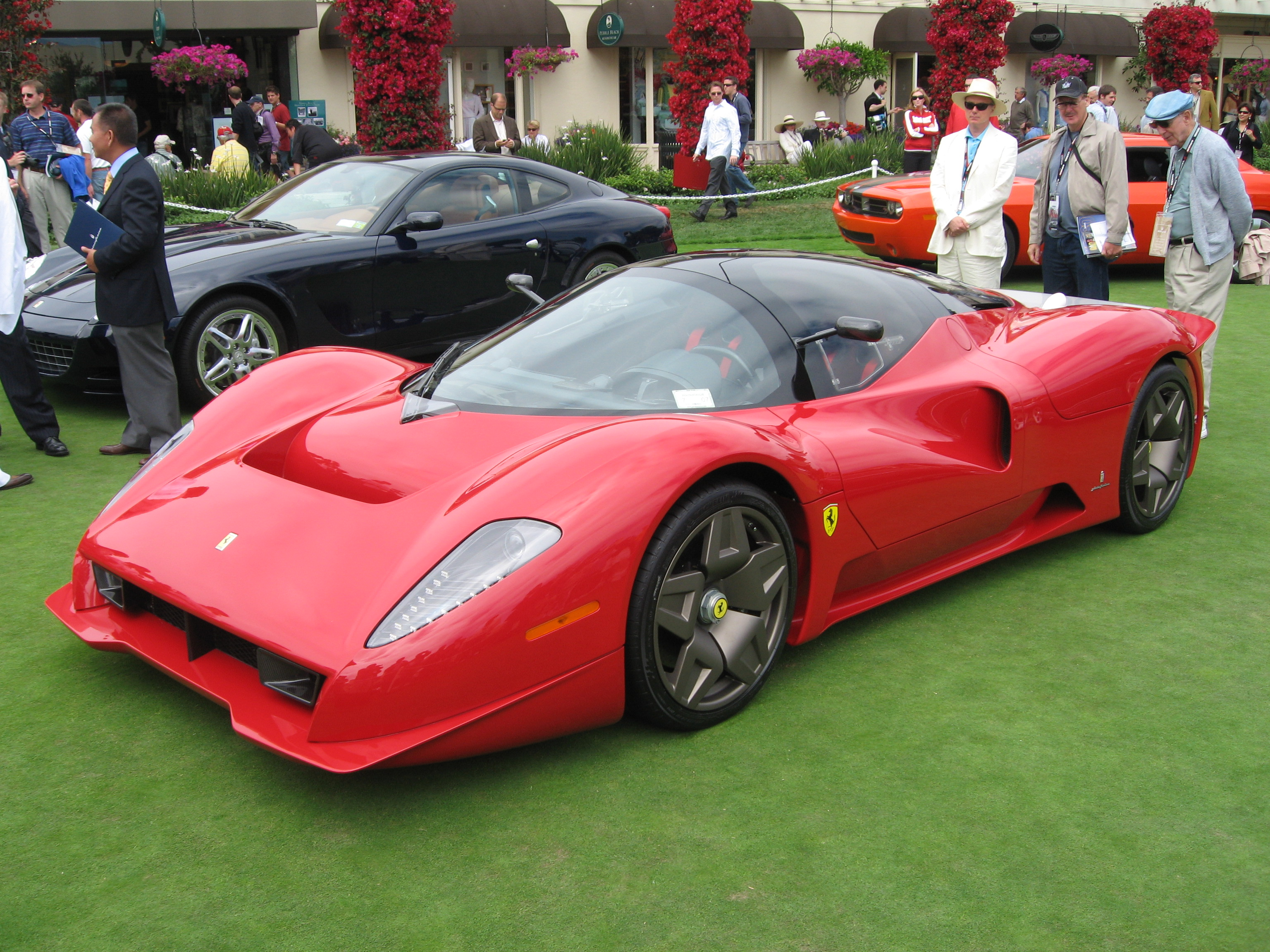
2006 Ferrari P4/5 by Pininfarina

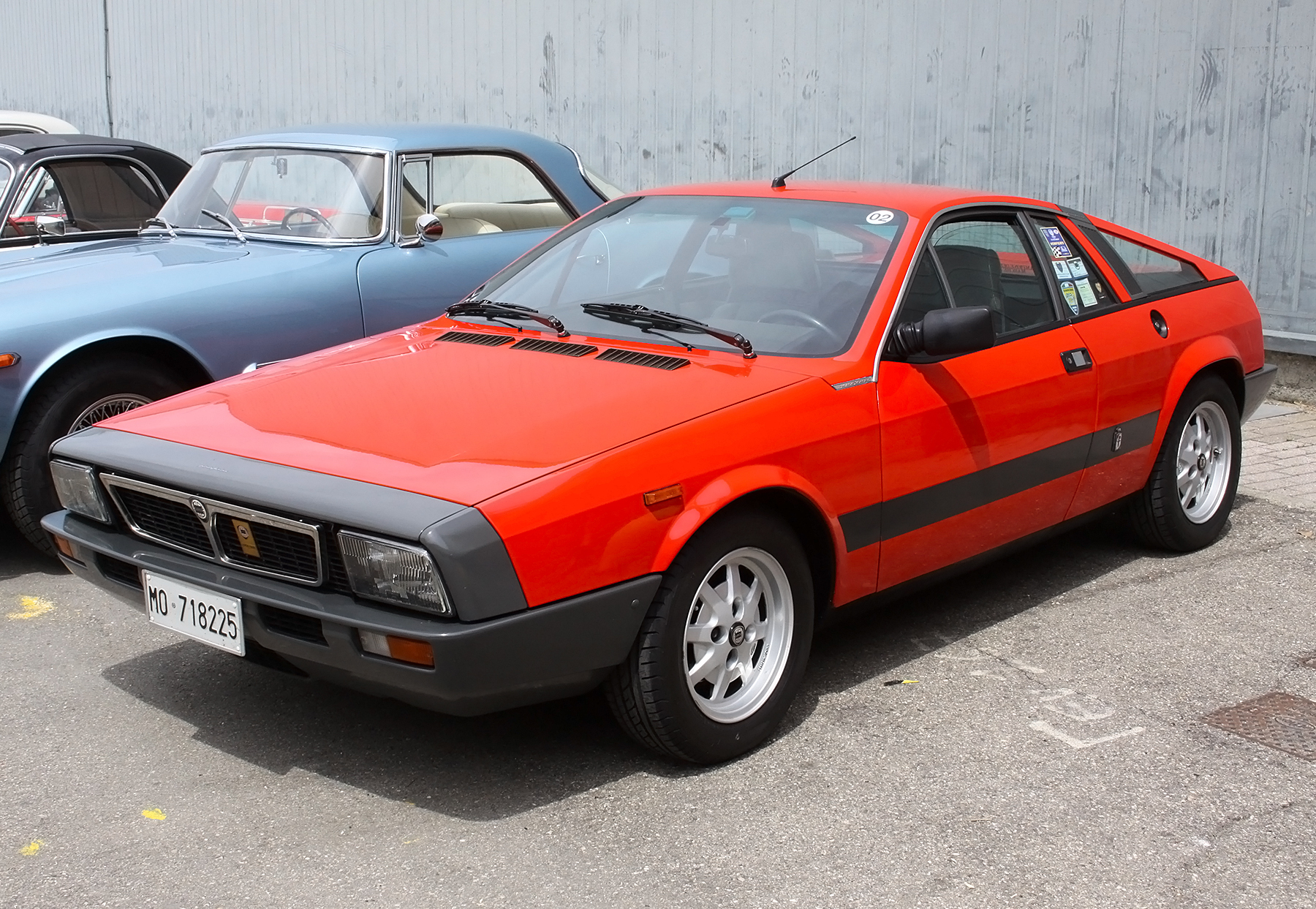
Lancia Montecarlo Series 2

=== Pre-World War II ===
Before the war, Pininfarina built car bodies primarily for individual customers; many of the bodies were "one-offs" and not mass-produced.

- 1931 Lancia Dilambda – the first official Pinin Farina special, presented at the Concours d’Elegance at Villa d’Este
- 1931 Hispano-Suiza Coupé
- 1931 Cadillac V16 Roadster – for the Maharajah of Orchha
- 1932 Fiat 518 Ardita
- 1933 Alfa Romeo 8C 2300
- 1934 Alfa Romeo 6C 2300 B Cabriolet
- 1936 Lancia Astura Cabriolet tipo Bocca – a series of six cars made for the Bocca brothers, Lancia dealers in Biella, Italy.
- 1935 Alfa Romeo 6C Pescara Coupé aerodinamico
- 1936 Lancia Aprilia
- 1936 Alfa Romeo 8C 2900
- 1937 Alfa Romeo 6C 2300-B Pescara Berlinetta
- 1937 Lancia Aprilia Aerodinamica
- 1938 Lancia Astura
- 1943 Alfa Romeo 6C 2500 Super Sport Pinin Farina Cabriolet

=== Concept cars, prototypes, and individual commissions ===
In addition to production vehicles, Pininfarina creates prototype, show, and custom cars for auto manufacturers, as well as private clients. Most prototypes—such as the Ferrari Mythos, were concept cars, although several have become production models, including the Ferrari 612 Scaglietti and Ferrari F50.

A recent privately commissioned custom example was the Ferrari P4/5 of 2006, a one-car change to the exterior design of the Enzo Ferrari according to the client's specifications. Its design began in September 2005 with sketches by Jason Castriota moving through computer-aided sculpture and stringent wind tunnel testing. More than 200 components were designed especially for the car, including the engine, drivetrain, and other components modified from the original Enzo Ferrari. The Vehicle Identification Number (VIN) is unchanged from the Enzo it was derived from. The P4/5 was publicly revealed on 18 August 2006 at the Pebble Beach Concours d'Elegance and shown again at the Paris Motor Show in late September. Another recent prototype is the Pininfarina Nido, a two-seater sub-compact that could make airbags obsolete.

The Pininfarina B0 solar-electric concept, designed with Bolloré was shown at the 2008 Paris Motor Show featuring a range between charges of more than 150 miles (241 km) with an electronically limited 88-mile-per-hour (142 km/h) top speed, and an estimated acceleration to 37 miles per hour (60 km/h) in 6.3 seconds. The car has solar panels on the roof and the nose, while its battery pack is said to last up to 125,000 miles (201,168 km).

On 15 May 2013, Pininfarina announced the BMW Pininfarina Gran Lusso Coupé to be revealed on 24 May at the Concorso d’Eleganza Villa d’Este. Pininfarina announced this one-off concept car as the first collaboration between BMW and Pininfarina, but in 1949 BMW commissioned Pininfarina design and build a pbuiltype of the BMW 501—it was rejected for being too modern.

- 1947 Alfa Romeo 6C 2500 S Paris Motor Show Prototype
- 1947 Lancia Aprilia Paris Motor Show Prototype
- 1947 Delahaye 135MS Coupé
- 1949 Alfa Romeo 6C 2500 Coupe Speciale
- 1949 BMW 501
- 1952 Lancia Aurelia B52 PF 200 spider –version 1
- 1952 Lancia Aurelia B52 PF 200 coupé –version 1
- 1953 Lancia Aurelia B52 PF 200 spider –version 2 and 3
- 1953 Four Berlinetta and one Spyder version of the Maserati A6GCS/53
- 1954 Cadillac Series 62 PF -built for Norman Granz
- 1954 Jaguar XK120 SE Max Hoffman coupé
- 1954 Lancia Aurelia B52 PF 200 coupé –version 2
- 1955 Ferrari 375 America Coupé Speciale
- 1955 Lancia Aurelia B55 PF 200 coupé –version 3
- 1955 Lancia Florida I coupe
- 1955 Lancia Florida I Berlina
- 1955 Nash Speciale
- 1956 Alfa Romeo 6C 3000 CM Super Flow Coupe
- 1956 Alfa Romeo 6C 3000 CM Super Flow II Coupe
- 1956 Rambler Palm Beach
- 1956 Ferrari 410 Superfast
- 1956 Ferrari 4.9 Superfast
- 1957 Abarth 750 Bialbero Record
- 1957 Abarth 500 Coupé
- 1957 Lancia Florida II
- 1959 Alfa Romeo 6C 3000 CM Spyder Super Sport
- 1959 Ferrari 400 Superamerica Coupé Speciale
- 1960 Ferrari 400 Superamerica Superfast II–IV
- 1960 Alfa Romeo 6C 3000 CM Superflow IV Coupé
- 1960 Pininfarina X
- 1961 Cadillac "Jacqueline" Brougham Coupé (named after Jacqueline Kennedy)
- 1961 Ferrari 250 GT Pininfarina Coupé Speciale
- 1962 Fiat 2300 Coupé Speciale
- 1963 Alfa Romeo 2600 Coupé Speciale
- 1963 Chevrolet Corvair Super Spyder Coupé (2 built)
- 1963 Chevrolet Corvette Rondine Coupé
- 1963 Fiat 2300 Cabriolet Speciale
- 1963 Fiat 2300 S Coupé Speciale Lausanne
- 1964 Fiat 2300 S Coupé Speciale
- 1963 Pininfarina PF Sigma
- 1963 Mercedes-Benz 230SL concept car ("Pininfarina Coupé")
- 1964 Abarth 1000 Spyder
- 1965 Abarth 1000 Coupé Speciale
- 1965 Alfa Romeo Giulia 1600 Sport
- 1965 Dino Berlinetta Speciale
- 1965 Ferrari 250 LM Pininfarina Stradale Speciale
- 1965 Fiat 2300 S Coupe Speciale
- 1966 Ferrari 365 P Berlinetta Speciale Tre-posti (2 built)
- 1966 Dino Berlinetta GT
- 1967 BMC 1800 Aerodinamica
- 1967 Dino Berlinetta Competizione
- 1967 Fiat Dino Parigi
- 1968 Fiat Dino Ginevra
- 1968 Bentley T1 Coupe Speciale
- 1968 BLMC 1100 Aerodinamica
- 1968 Alfa Romeo P33 Roadster
- 1968 Ferrari P6 Berlinetta Speciale
- 1968 MG EX.234 Roadster
- 1968 Ferrari 250 P5 Berlinetta Speciale
- 1969 Abarth 2000
- 1969 Alfa Romeo 33/2 Coupé Speciale
- 1969 Ferrari Sigma Grand Prix monoposto F1
- 1969 Ferrari 512S Berlinetta Speciale
- 1969 Fiat 128 Teenager
- 1970 Ferrari Modulo
- 1970 Mercedes-Benz 300 SEL 6.3 Pininfarina coupé
- 1971 Alfa Romeo P33 Cuneo
- 1971 Peugeot Break Riviera
- 1971 NSU Ro 80
- 1972 Alfa Romeo Alfetta Spider
- 1973 Autobianchi A112 Giovani
- 1973 Chevrolet Corvette XP-897GT – Designed by GM, built by Pininfarina
- 1974 Ferrari CR 25
- 1974 Fiat 130 Maremma
- 1975 Alfa Romeo Eagle
- 1975 Fiat 130 Opera sedan
- 1975 Peugeot Peugette
- 1978 Fiat Ecos
- 1978 Jaguar XJ Spider
- 1978 Lancia Gamma Spider
- 1978 Pininfarina CNR-PF
- 1980 Ferrari Pinin
- 1980 Lancia Gamma Scala sedan
- 1981 Audi Quartz
- 1982 Lancia Gamma Olgiata
- 1983 Pininfarina Brio – based on Fiat Ritmo Abarth 125 TC
- 1984 Honda HP-X concept car
- 1985 Peugeot Griffe 4
- 1986 Alfa Romeo Vivace Coupé and Spider
- 1988 Lancia HIT
- 1988 Ferrari F90
- 1989 Ferrari Mythos
- 1990 Pininfarina CNR E2
- 1991 Opel Chronos
- 1992 Jaguar XJ220 Pininfarina
- 1992 Fiat Cinquecento 4x4 pick-up
- 1992 Pininfarina Ethos
- 1993 Pininfarina Ethos 2
- 1994 Fiat Spunto
- 1994 Pininfarina Ethos 3
- 1995 Honda Argento Vivo
- 1995 Honda SSM
- 1996 Fiat Sing e Song – a pair of concept cars based on the Fiat Bravo and Brava
- 1996 Pininfarina etabeta
- 1996 Ferrari FX
- 1997 Peugeot Nautilus
- 1998 Alfa Romeo Dardo Spider
- 1999 Fiat Wish Cabriolet / Coupé
- 1999 Pininfarina Metrocubo
- 2000 Ferrari Rossa
- 2001 Ford Start
- 2001 Citroën Osée
- 2002 Hafei HF Fantasy
- 2003 Pininfarina Lotus Enjoy
- 2004 Pininfarina Double-Face
- 2004 Pininfarina Nido
- 2004 Saturn Curve – Built by Pininfarina, designed by GM in Sweden
- 2005 Chery M14
- 2005 Maserati Birdcage 75th
- 2006 Ferrari 612 Kappa one-off for Peter S. Kalikow
- 2006 Ferrari P4/5 by Pininfarina one-off for James Glickenhaus
- 2008 Pininfarina B0 electric car
- 2008 Pininfarina Sintesi
- 2008 Rolls-Royce Phantom Drophead Coupé Hyperion
- 2009 Tata Pr1ma
- 2009 Ferrari P540 Superfast Aperta – one-off for Edward Walson, based on the Ferrari 599
- 2010 Alfa Romeo 2uettottanta concept car
- 2010 New Stratos for Michael Stoschek
- 2010 Pininfarina Nido EV
- 2012 Pininfarina Cambiano
- 2012 Ferrari SP12 EC one-off for Eric Clapton (with Ferrari Styling Centre)
- 2013 Pininfarina Sergio
- 2013 BMW Gran Lusso Coupé
- 2014 Ferrari SP FFX
- 2014 Ferrari SP America
- 2015 Ferrari Sergio
- 2016 H2 Speed concept car
- 2016 Ferrari SP275 RW Competizione one-off (with Ferrari Styling Centre)
- 2017 Fittipaldi EF7 Vision Gran Turismo by Pininfarina.
- 2018 Pininfarina HK GT
- 2019 Karma GT
- 2021 Mahindra Pininfarina Teorema
- 2022 NAMX HUV
- 2022 Pininfarina Viritech Apricale

=== Production cars designed by Pininfarina ===
A list of post-WWII cars designed by Pininfarina that went into production.

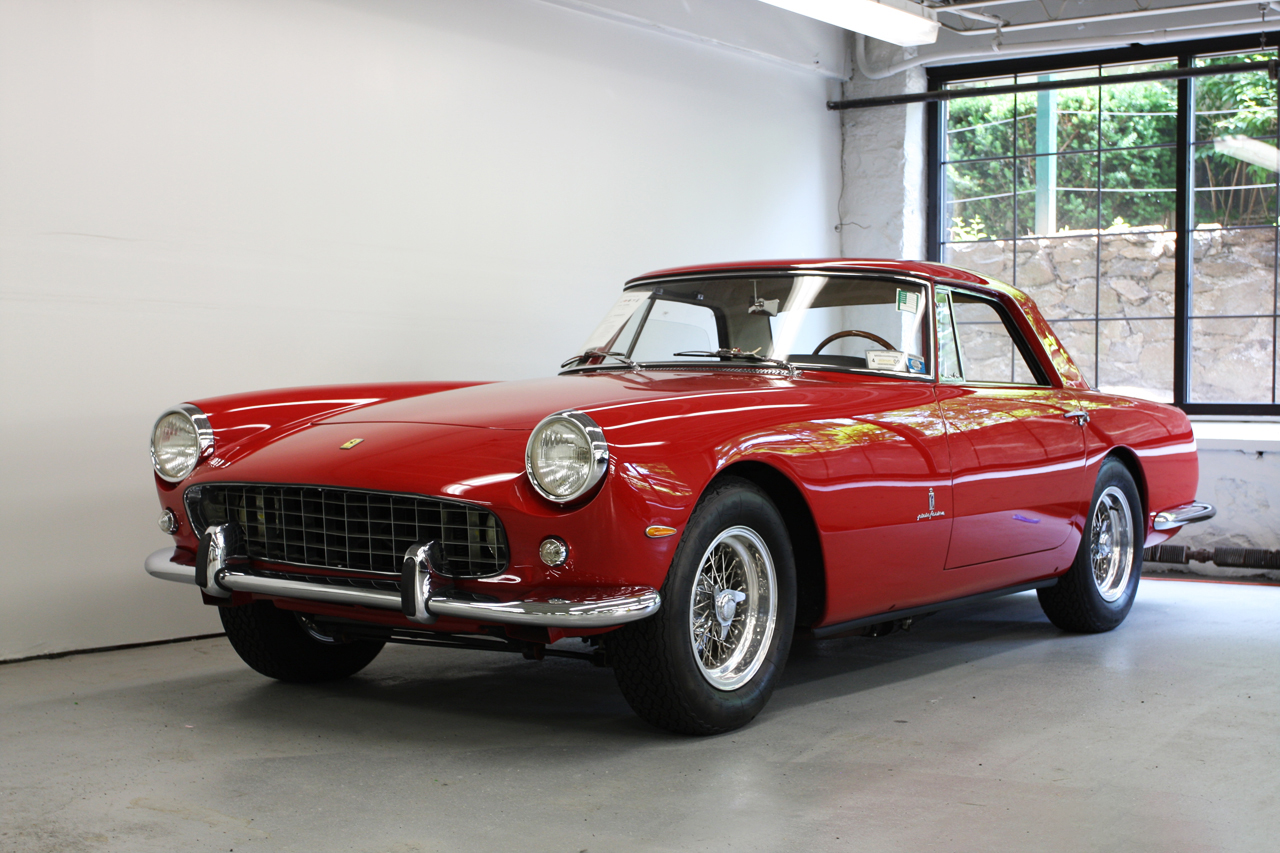
1962 Ferrari 250 GT Coupé Pinin Farina

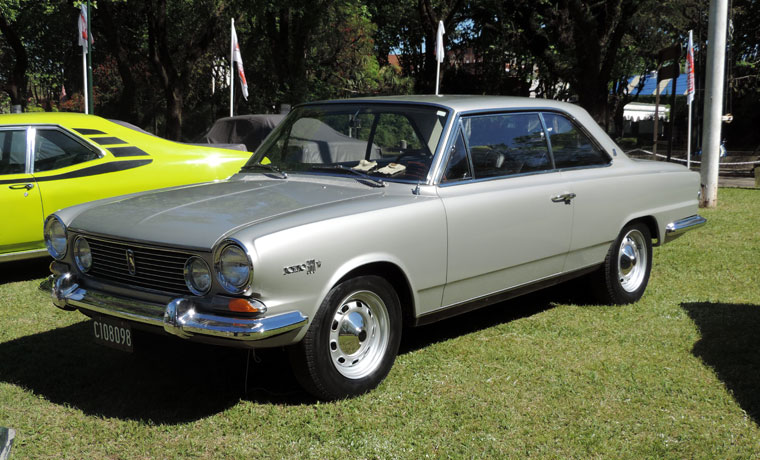
IKA Torino 380 W (1967) Argentina

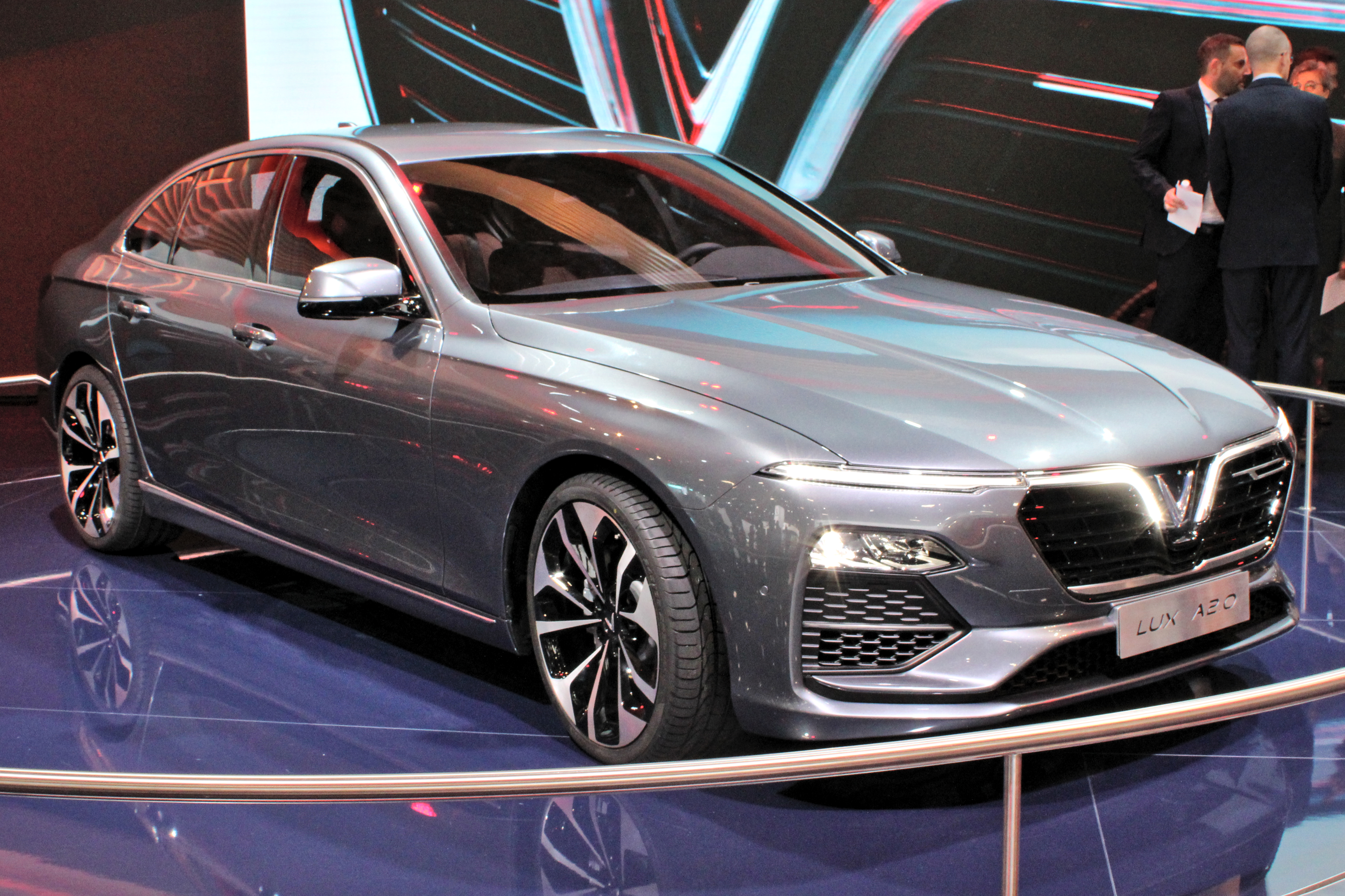
Vinfast Lux A 2.0

- 1948 Cisitalia 202
- 1949 Simca 8 Sport Coupé and Cabriolet
- 1951 Rolls-Royce Silver Dawn continental coupe
- 1952 Ferrari 212 Inter
- 1952 Nash Ambassador
- 1952 Nash-Healey
- 1953 Ferrari 250 Europa
- 1954 Ferrari 250 Europa GT
- 1956 Alfa Romeo Giulietta Spider
- 1955 Ferrari 410 Superamerica
- 1955 Peugeot 403
- 1956 Austin A40 Farina
- 1956 Ferrari 250 GT Berlinetta
- 1956 Ferrari 250 GT Coupé – Bodied by Boano/Ellena
- 1957 Lancia Flaminia
- 1957 Ferrari 250 GT Cabriolet
- 1957 Ferrari 250 GT California Spyder
- 1958 BMC Farina cars – Austin A55 Cambridge Mk II, MG Magnette Mk III, Morris Oxford V, Riley 4/68, Wolseley 15/60
- 1958 Ferrari 250 GT Coupé
- 1959 Fiat 1800/2100
- 1959 Fiat Pininfarina Cabriolet
- 1959 Ferrari 400 Superamerica
- 1960 Ferrari 250 GT 2+2
- 1960 Peugeot 404
- 1961 Fiat 2300
- 1961 Lancia Flavia Coupé
- 1962 BMC ADO16
- 1962 Ferrari 250 GT Berlinetta Lusso
- 1963 Datsun Bluebird 410
- 1963 Ferrari 330 America
- 1964 BMC ADO17 (Austin/Morris/Wolesley)
- 1964 Ferrari 500 Superfast
- 1964 Ferrari 275 GTB and GTS
- 1965 MG MGB GT
- 1965 Nissan Cedric 130
- 1965 Peugeot 204
- 1966 Ferrari 330 GT 2+2
- 1966 Alfa Romeo Spider
- 1966 Ferrari 330 GTC and GTS
- 1966 Fiat 124 Sport Spider
- 1966 Fiat Dino Spider
- 1966 IKA-Renault Torino
- 1966 Ferrari 365 California
- 1967 Ferrari 365 GT 2+2
- 1968 Dino 206 GT
- 1968 Ferrari 365 GTC and GTS
- 1968 Ferrari 365 GTB/4 and GTS/4
- 1968 Peugeot 504 sedan, coupé and cabriolet
- 1969 Peugeot 304 Cabriolet and Coupé
- 1969 Dino 246 GT and GTS
- 1971 Fiat 130 Coupé
- 1971 Ferrari 365 GTC/4
- 1972 Ferrari 365 GT4 2+2
- 1972 Peugeot 104
- 1973 Ferrari 365 GT4 BB
- 1974 Lancia Beta Spider
- 1975 Lancia Beta HPE
- 1975 Ferrari 308 GTB and GTS
- 1975 Peugeot 604
- 1975 Lancia Beta Montecarlo
- 1975 Rolls-Royce Camargue
- 1976 Ferrari 400
- 1976 Lancia Gamma (saloon and coupé)
- 1977 Peugeot 305
- 1978 Jaguar XJ – series 3 redesign
- 1979 Peugeot 505
- 1980 Ferrari Mondial
- 1981 Lancia Rally 037
- 1984 Honda City Cabriolet
- 1984 Ferrari Testarossa
- 1984 Ferrari 288 GTO
- 1985 Ferrari 328
- 1985 Peugeot 205 Cabriolet and Saloon (4 doors) based on Peugeot's Director of Exterior Design, Gerard Welter's, initial design of the 205 (1983)
- 1985 Ferrari 412
- 1987 Alfa Romeo 164
- 1987 Cadillac Allanté
- 1987 Ferrari F40
- 1987 Peugeot 405
- 1989 Ferrari 348
- 1989 Peugeot 605
- 1991 Honda Beat
- 1992 Ferrari 456
- 1993 Fiat Coupé – Interior only
- 1993 Peugeot 306 hatchback and cabriolet
- 1993/4 Alfa Romeo GTV & Spider
- 1994 Ferrari F355
- 1995 MG F – Roof structure only
- 1995 Ferrari F50
- 1996 Ferrari 550 Maranello
- 1996 Lancia Kappa SW
- 1997 Peugeot 406 Coupé
- 1998 Mitsubishi Pajero Pinin
- 1999 Ferrari 360
- 1999 Songhuajiang Hafei Zhongyi
- 2000 Daewoo Tacuma
- 2000 Ferrari 550 Barchetta Pininfarina
- 2001 Hyundai Matrix
- 2002 Daewoo Lacetti saloon and station wagon
- 2002 Enzo Ferrari
- 2002 Ferrari 575M Maranello
- 2002 Hafei Lobo
- 2003 Maserati Quattroporte
- 2003 Ford StreetKa
- 2004 Ferrari 612 Scaglietti
- 2004 Ferrari F430 (with Ferrari-Maserati Concept Design and Development)
- 2004 Peugeot 1007
- 2005 Hafei Saibao/ 2012 Coda (electric car)
- 2005 Ferrari Superamerica
- 2006 Ferrari 599 GTB Fiorano
- 2006 Mitsubishi Colt CZC
- 2006 Volvo C70 – Roof Structure engineering only
- 2006 Alfa Romeo Spider
- 2006 Brilliance BS4
- 2007 Brilliance BC3
- 2007 Chery A3 and Chery A3 Sport
- 2007 Ford Focus Coupé-Cabriolet
- 2007 Maserati GranTurismo
- 2008 Ferrari California
- 2008 JAC Heyue Tongyue (J3/A108)
- 2009 Ferrari 458 Italia (with Ferrari-Maserati Concept Design and Development)
- 2009 Leopaard CS7
- 2010 Maserati GranCabrio
- 2011 Bolloré Bluecar
- 2011 Ferrari FF (with Ferrari Styling Centre)
- 2012 Ferrari F12berlinetta (with Ferrari Styling Centre)
- 2014 Soueast DX7
- 2014 Ferrari California T (with Ferrari Styling Centre)
- 2016 Soueast DX3
- 2017 Mitsubishi Lancer
- 2018 VinFast LUX SA2.0
- 2018 VinFast LUX A2.0
- 2019 Soueast DX5
- 2020 Chery eQ5
- 2020 Haima 7X
- 2020 Cowin Showjet
- 2021 VinFast VF 8
- 2021 VinFast VF 9
- 2022 Togg T10X
- 2023 Rox 01
- 2024 Morgan Midsummer
- 2025 Togg T10F
- 2025 Foxtron Bria

=== Electric propulsion ===
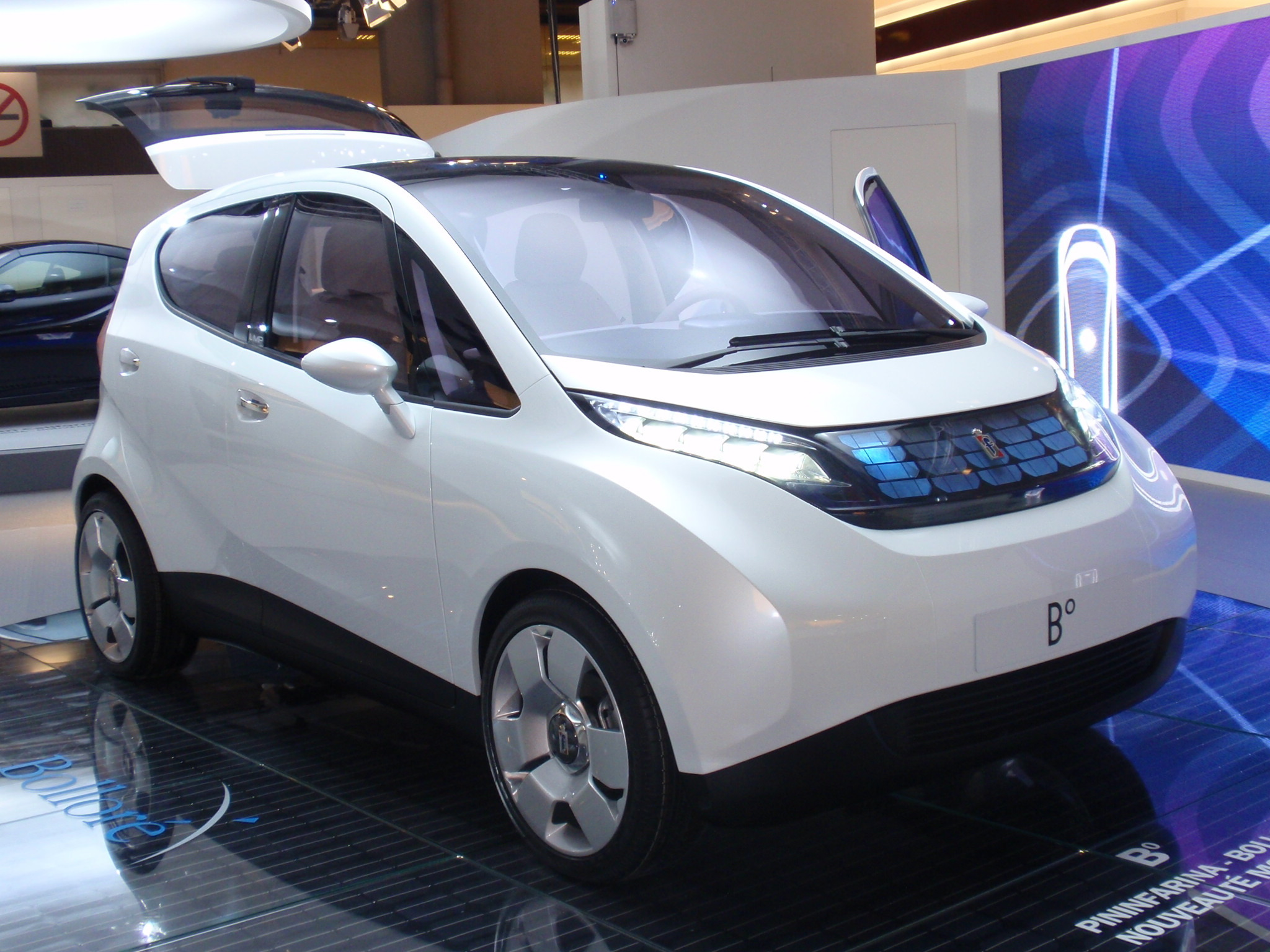
Pininfarina B0

Pininfarina has an area dedicated to the new electric car Pininfarina Bolloré. Batteries are produced by the French Bolloré Group.

Pininfarina has introduced its electric vehicle concept, the Pininfarina B0 (pronounced "B Zero"). The four-seat hatchback features a solid-state lithium-polymer battery, supercapacitors, and a roof-integrated solar panel to achieve a range of 153 miles (246 km). Developed in partnership with the Bolloré Group, the vehicle was slated for limited production in 2009 as the Bolloré Bluecar.

Pininfarina displayed a turbine-powered plug-in hybrid called the Cambiano at the 2012 Geneva Motor Show.

At the 2016 Geneva Motor Show Pininfarina revealed the H2 Speed, an electric sports car concept. The H2 Speed is a hydrogen vehicle with two race-specification electric motors which are fed by a hydrogen fuel cell. The hydrogen power unit was designed by Swiss company GreenGT.

==== Automobili Pininfarina Battista ====
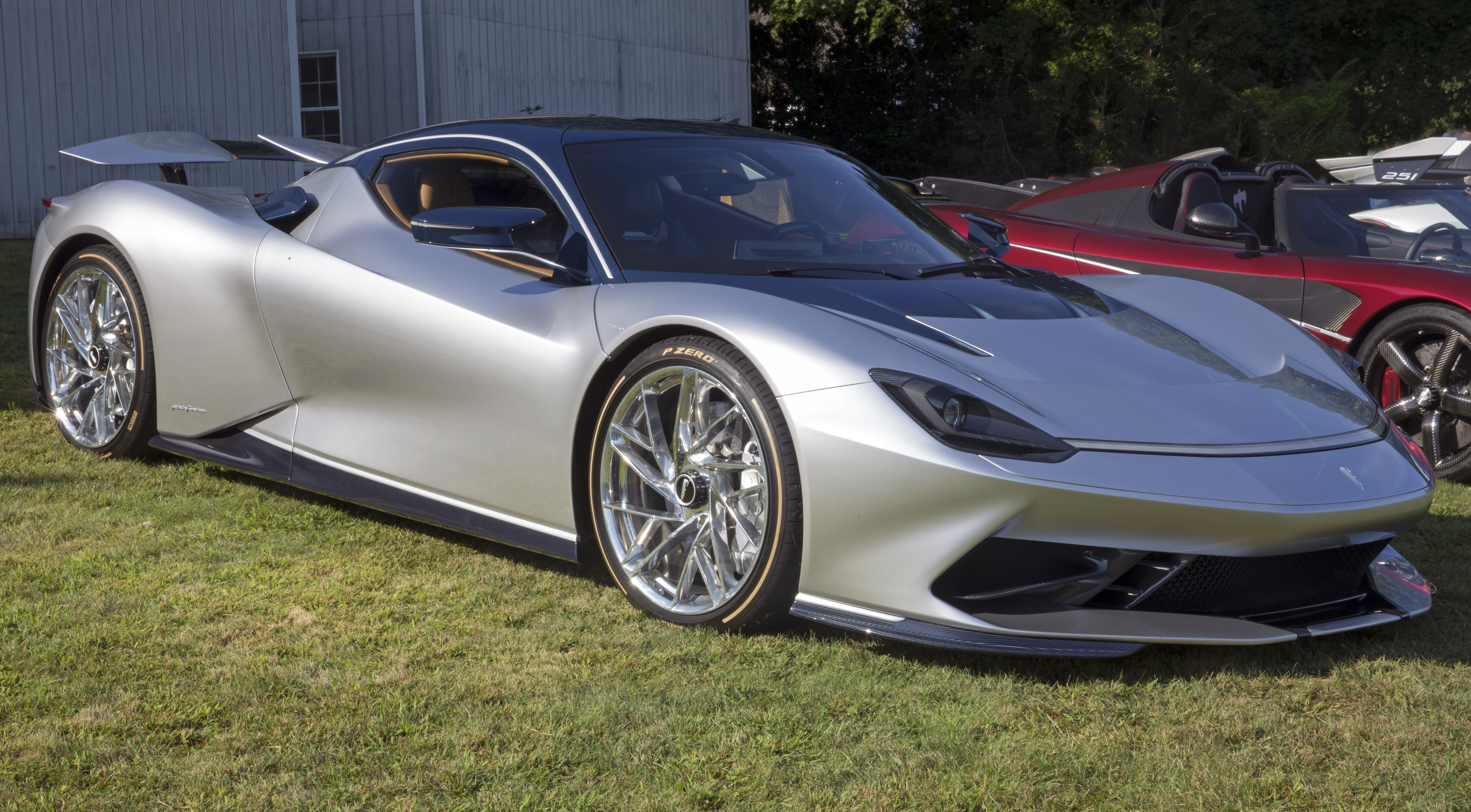
Pininfarina Battista

On 27 November 2018, it was announced that Automobili Pininfarina had invested over €20m in Pininfarina design services to support plans for its range of luxury electric cars. This includes design and engineering services for the first Pininfarina-branded performance car which is a luxury electric sports car called the Battista (named after company founder Battista 'Pinin' Farina and originally codenamed PF0). With four electric motors, the car is supposed to be able to reach 100 km/h (62 mph) from a standstill in under two seconds with a top speed of 350 km/h (217 mph). Automobili Pininfarina plans to reveal the car at the 2019 Geneva Motor Show. Further details on the Battista surfaced on 4 March 2019. It has 1900 horsepower, and only 150 will be built. It is also related to the Rimac C Two.

==== Additional work ====
In 2018, Pininfarina also worked with Mahindra to produce the Furio mass transport truck. In 2020, Pininfarina received four Good Design awards for its automotive creations, including the AutoNomia, an autonomous driving simulator, and the Green Motion Residenza electric car refueling station. In 2021, the company debuted its Teorema style of electric vehicle for autonomous driving, which uses the space where a wheel is generally stationed in most cars for additional seating room. They also partnered with Gaussin to create the H2 Racing Truck. In 2022, Pininfarina expanding its retail partner network in North America to include shops in Chicago and Orange County.

== Other vehicles ==
=== Nautical design ===
- Primatist Aerotop Pininfarina range: G46, G53, B62, G70.
- Magnum Marine 80' Series
- Pershing 88' Pininfarina Limited Edition, a one-off body designed by Pininfarina. Yacht was used in a Visa Black Card commercial.
- Fincantieri Ottantacinque by Pininfarina Project.
- Schaefer 620 and 800 by Pininfarina, interiors.
- Schaefer 510 GT Pininfarina.
- Persico Marine WallyCento Project.
- Azimut 65 Pininfarina.
- Azimut Atlantic Challenger.
- Persico F70
- Oceanco Kairos By Pininfarina
- Princess X95, X85, V55, R35
- Rossinavi Aurea and
- Rossinavi Super Sport 65
- Persico Fly40
- NX44

=== Mass transport ===
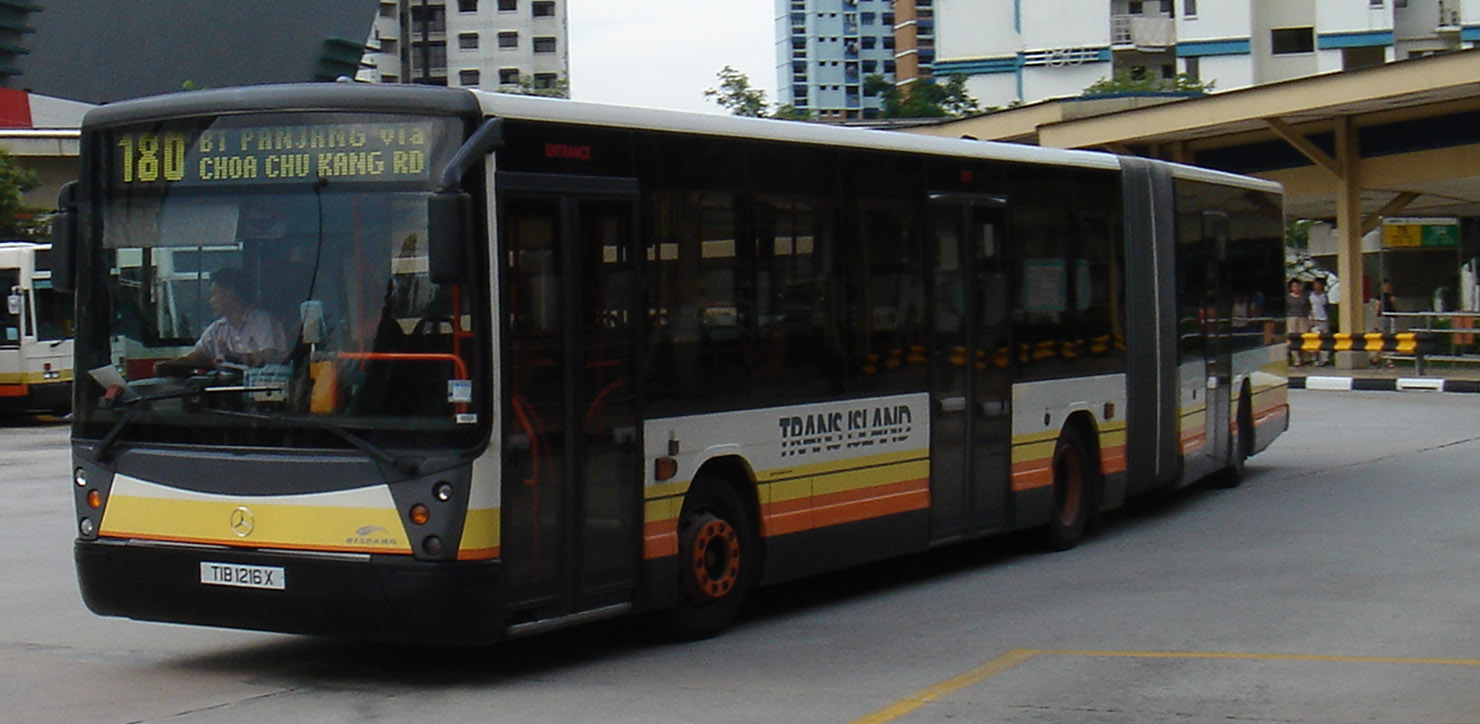
2000 Mercedes-Benz O405G Hispano Habit

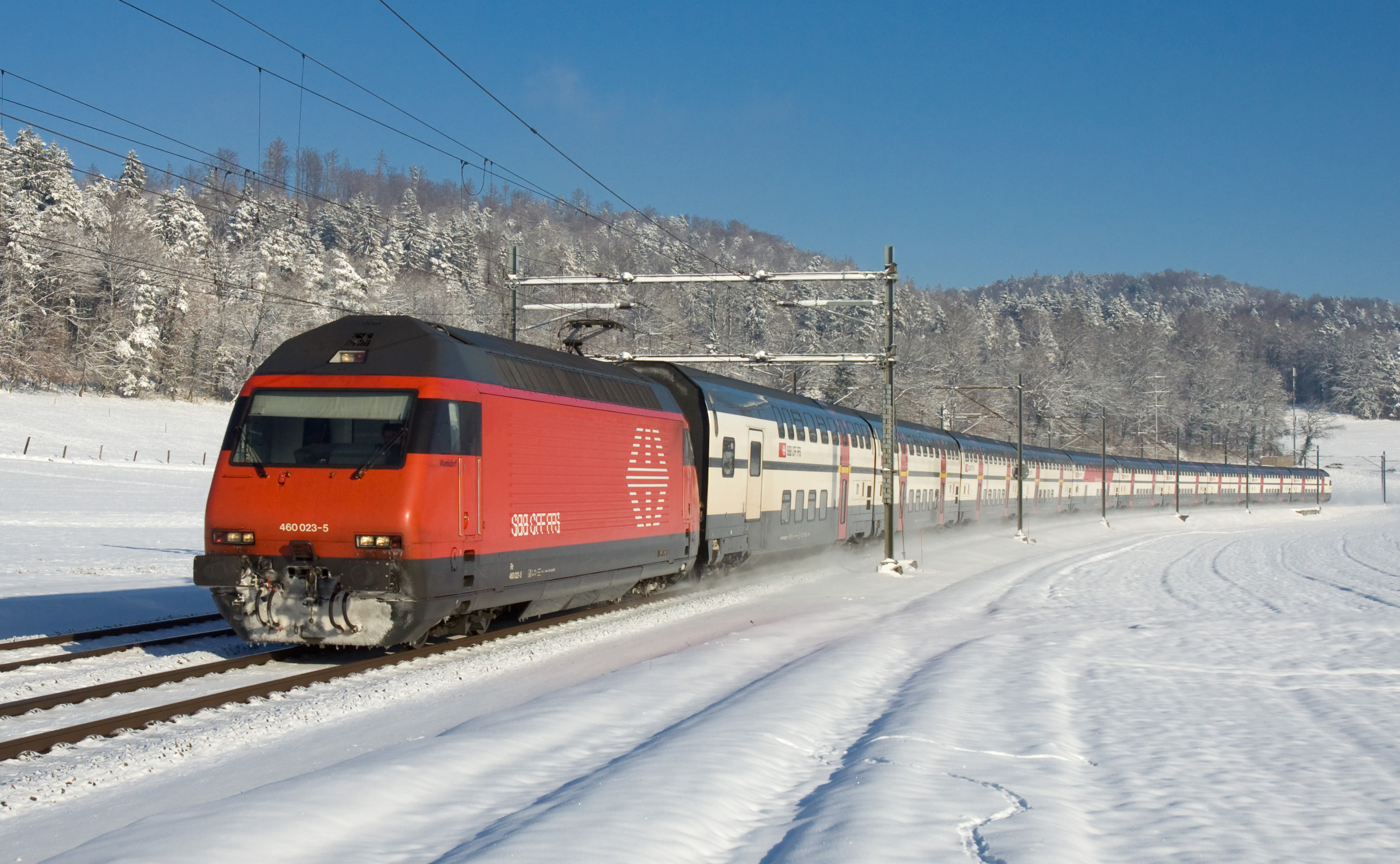
1991–1997 Re 460 locomotive and IC 2000 train

- 1987–2000 ETR 500 Italian high-speed trainset
- 1991 SBB-CFF-FFS Re 460 (electric locomotive for the Swiss Federal Railways)
- 1996 ALe 426/506 TAF "High Occupancy Train" for Italian commuter lines.
- 1997 IC 2000 (double-decker train for the Swiss Federal Railways, matching the electric locomotive Re 460)
- 1999–2007 AnsaldoBreda Type 8 Green Line Trolley Car for the MBTA.
- 2000 Hispano Carrocera Habit buses.
- 2000 SBB-CFF-FFS RABDe 500 (tilting train for the Swiss Federal Railways)
- 2001 AnsaldoBreda Class 72 electric multiple unit trains for the Norwegian Railways.
- 2001 Bombardier Cobra tram for Zürich.
- 2004 AnsaldoBreda Sirio tram, Athens version
- 2005 AnsaldoBreda IC4 inter-city diesel multiple unit trains for the Danish railways.
- 2008 AnsaldoBreda Fyra V250 high-speed train for NS Hispeed
- 2009 AnsaldoBreda-Firema Metrostar, suburban train for Circumvesuviana in Naples
- 2009 Eurostar appoints Pininfarina to undertake design work for train refurbishment.

== Collaborations ==
Pininfarina has worked within the nautical sector, collaborating with Beneteau, Primatist, Fincantieri, Schaefer, Persico Marine, Wally, and Princess. Pininfarina designed the external livery and interiors of the Eurostar’s e320 train in 2015. Pininfarina was also involved with the design of the new Leitner Station.

Pininfarina designed the Costa Coffee CEM-200 Marlow Self-Serve Espresso Bar. and the Coca-Cola Freestyle. They also partnered with Bovet 1822 on the Flying Tourbillon wristwatch, creating the Bovet by Pininfarina Collection, in addition to Chivas Regal to produce a limited edition 18-year-old scotch whisky. In 2018, Pininfarina partnered with De Rosa to produce the Metamorphosis bicycle. In 2015, Pininfarina partnered with Hexagon Partners to produce the Global Evo CMM. In 2017, the company partnered with Cisco to design the Catalyst 9000 switch. Pininfarina was asked to design a new spray gun for Anest Iwata, creating the Supernova Pininfarina. In 2021, Pininfarina created the “straddle tractor concept” for use in grapevine picking operations.

=== Other works ===
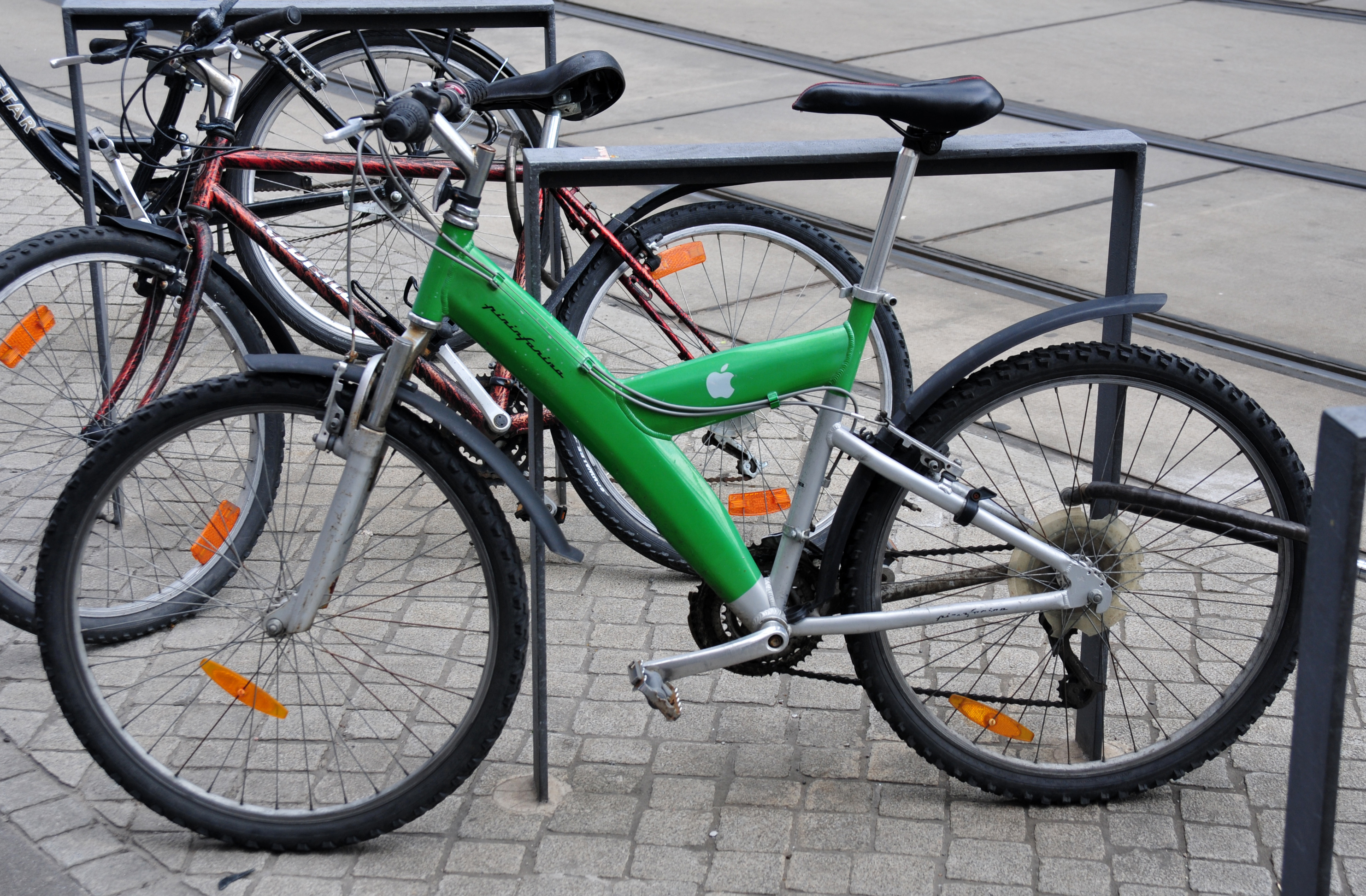
Bicycle designed by Pininfarina

Pininfarina also works with other companies such as SimpleTech for product design.

Other Pininfarina product designs include the 2006 Winter Olympics torch, cauldron and medals, as well as major appliance collections for Gorenje.

In December 1999, Pininfarina cooperated with Casio and designed a watch under its label, the G-Shock GE-2000. However, the watch received criticism due to its weak strap, which was vulnerable to breaking during regular use.

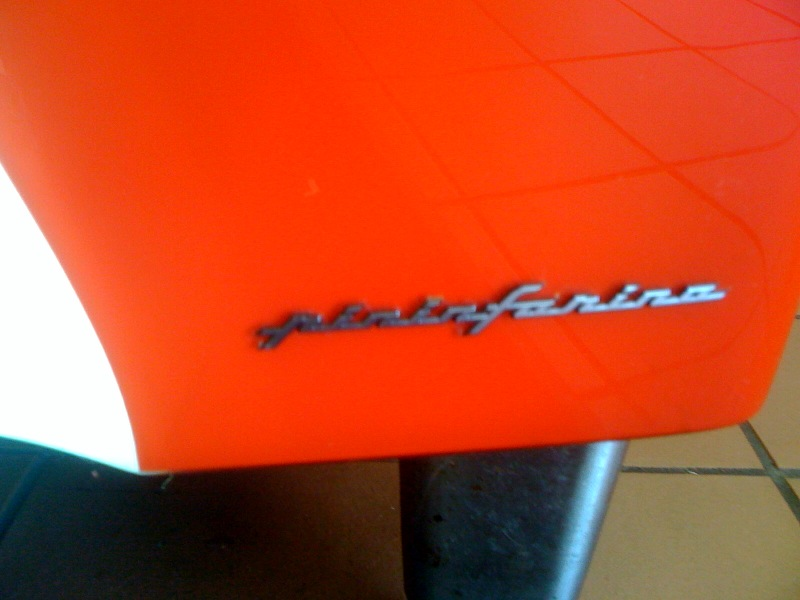
Pininfarina logo on Coca-Cola Freestyle machine

Pininfarina was a design contractor for the development of the Coca-Cola Freestyle drinks dispenser.

Pininfarina was asked to design a new spray gun for Anest Iwata, creating the Supernova Pininfarina.

Pininfarina designed the 1100 Millecento Residences interiors in Miami, Florida in 2012 and the beachwalk waterfront residences interiors in Hallandale Beach, Florida in 2013.

== See also ==
- Magna Steyr
- Heuliez
- Valmet Automotive
- Ken Okuyama
- Andrea Pininfarina
- Fabio Filippini
- Gruppo Bertone
- Italdesign Giugiaro
