= Pininfarina Sintesi =

Overview
- Manufacturer: Pininfarina
- Production: 2008
- Designer: Lowie Vermeersch at Pininfarina

Body and chassis
- Class: Concept car
- Body style: 4-door shooting-brake
- Layout: FR layout
- Doors: Scissor doors (front); Suicide scissor doors (rear)

Powertrain
- Engine: Hydrogen fuel cell

Dimensions
- Wheelbase: 2,990 mm (117.7 in)
- Length: 4,974 mm (195.8 in)
- Width: 1,988 mm (78.3 in)
- Height: 1,298 mm (51.1 in)

The Pininfarina Sintesi is a concept car designed by Pininfarina and unveiled in 2008 at the Geneva Motor Show. The name 'Sintesi' means 'synthesis' in the Italian language.

== Context ==
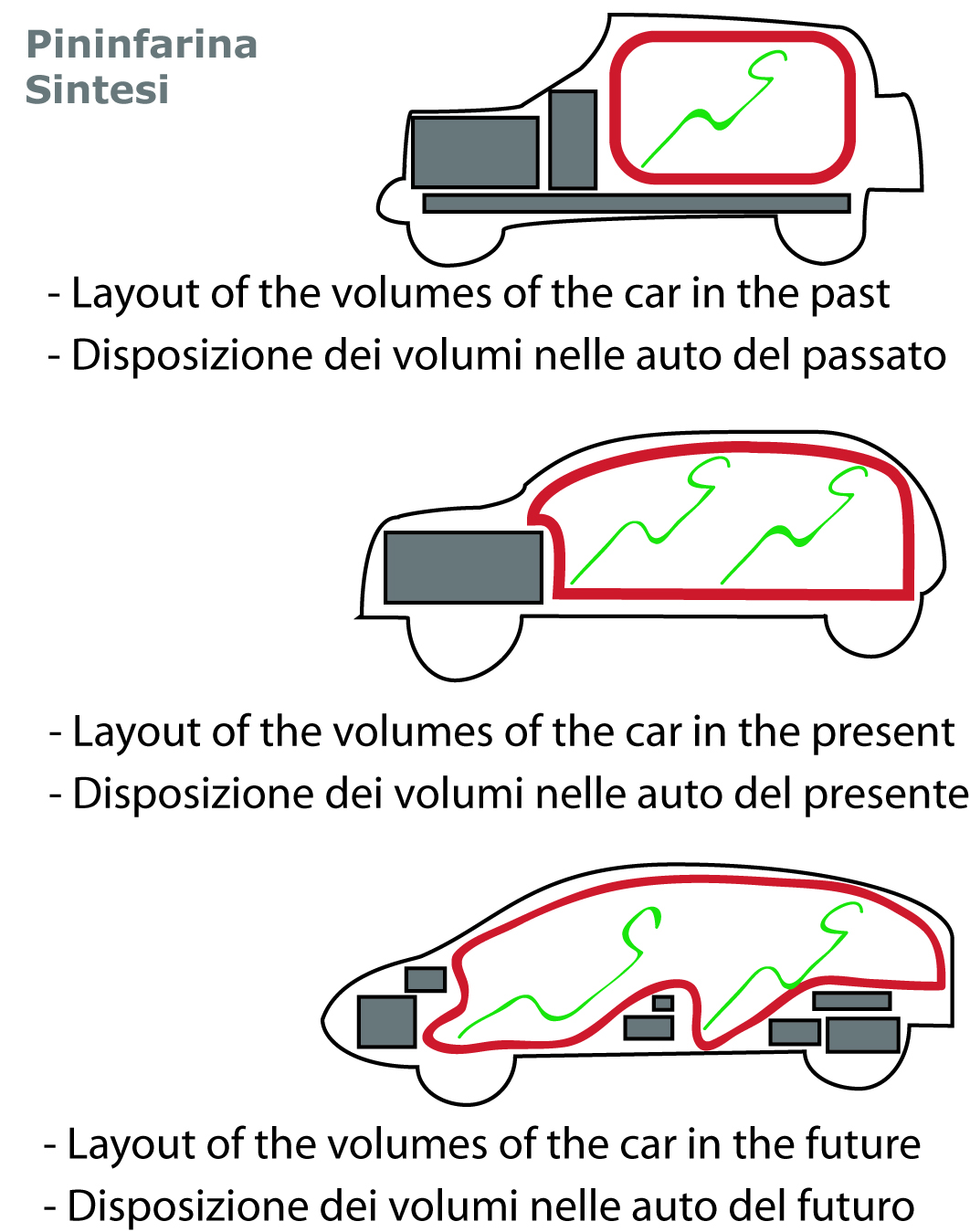
Pininfarina Sintesi - Study of the layout of the volumes

The Pininfarina Sintesi was a 4-door 4-seat shooting-brake. The concept was born from the manufacturer's view of interpreting the car of the future. With the Sintesi, Pininfarina introduced concepts including "Liquid Packaging" and "Transparent Mobility":

- Liquid Packaging refers to the concept of putting fuel cells and motors in each wheel. The result is the increase of space for the passengers – in proportion to the total volume of the car – without detracting from the tapered and aerodynamic profile. According to Pininfarina, the conventional powertrains were bulky and that's why for the Sintesi, designers have developed a new fuel cell powertrain that can be spread out into different locations in the car.
- Transparent Mobility refers to the communication system where the vehicle through wireless technology can exchange information with other vehicles and traffic.

Lowie Vermeersch, Pininfarina's head of design at that time said in his statement, “Our source of inspiration, was man’s freedom over technology, a car in which technology gives creative freedom back to the designer and allows us to explore new forms and future scenarios. But at the same time, we did not want everything to be limited to a flight of fancy, we wanted our approach to be very concrete. Which is why we combined and tested our ideas with the innovative technologies provided by our partners in this project.”

== Awards ==
The Pininfarina Sintesi won the Red Dot Award for 2008, among more than 1900 competitors from 48 countries. This prestigious award ranks among the largest and most renowned design competitions in the world.

== Design ==
The exterior design featured large windshield surface and a front spoiler. Scissor doors were used at the front and rear which allowed easy entry and exit of the occupants. The overall flowing and smooth look of the side view is combined with the sharp edges that characterize the wheels, the front end and the rear end, while the side air intakes and outlets give a sporty touch to an already dynamic design and create an interplay of convex and concave surfaces.

== Technical information ==
The Fuel Cell technology was developed in partnership with Nuvera, which developed the Quadrivium Fuel Cell system, the various components of which were distributed around the car, with four fuel cells positioned near the wheels.

The total output is around 700 hp (710 PS; 522 kW). The centre tunnel integrates a bio-fuel tank and a reformer capable of producing hydrogen. In terms of performance, the Sintesi has a projected top speed of 115 mph (185 km/h) and has a 0–60 mph (97 km/h) acceleration time of 7.5 seconds.

The car was equipped with a wireless system called Clancast, developed by Reicom, which manages all the communication through sensors and a control unit between the car and its passengers and also among different vehicles in the traffic.
