= Pininfarina H2 Speed =

Car model

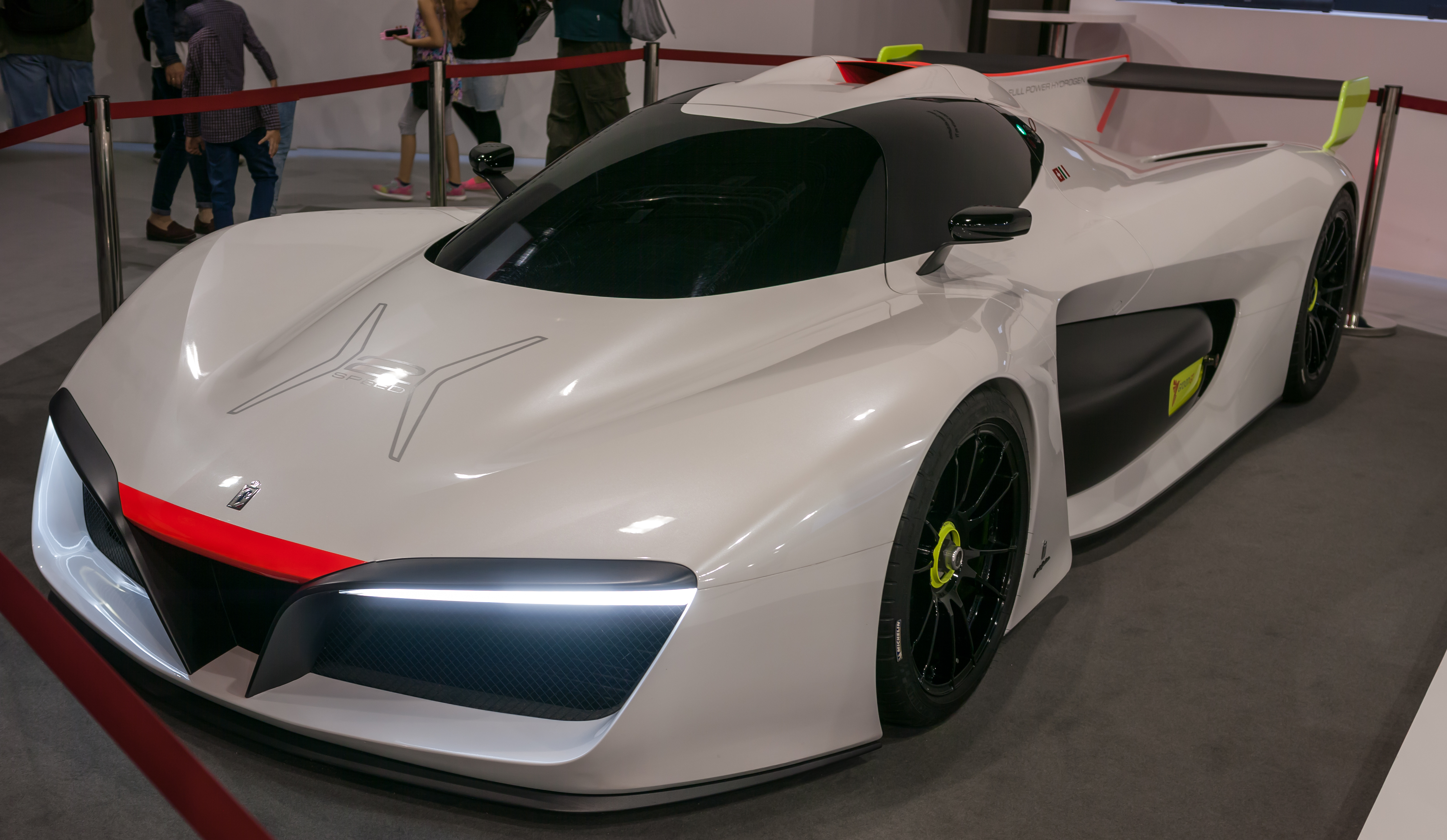
- 2016 Pininfarina H2 Speed

Overview
- Manufacturer: Pininfarina

Body and chassis
- Class: Concept car
- Body style: 2-door coupé

The Pininfarina H2 Speed is a hydrogen-powered concept car developed by Pininfarina and GreenGT. The car was first presented in 2016.

It notably appears in the racing game Asphalt Legends as a C-class car.

== Specifications and features ==
The H2 Speed is the first high-performance car powered by a hydrogen fuel cell. The car was unveiled on 1 March 2016 at the 86th Geneva International Motor Show. Until 13 March, it was presented to visitors who pass through the Palexpo gates.
