= Citroën Osée =

Overview
- Manufacturer: Citroën
- Production: 2001
- Designer: Pininfarina

Body and chassis
- Class: Concept car
- Body style: 1-door berlinetta
- Layout: Mid-engine, rear-wheel-drive
- Doors: Canopy door

Powertrain
- Engine: 3.0 L V6
- Transmission: 5-speed ZF automatic

The Citroën Osée is a concept car designed by Pininfarina for the French car company Citroën. It was unveiled at the 2001 Geneva Motor Show.

The Osée is powered by a mid-mounted 3-litre V6 engine, providing the vehicle with 200 bhp (149 kW) at 6000 rpm, with a maximum torque of 267 N⋅m (197 lb⋅ft) at 3750 rpm. The concept rides on Michelin PAX tires, stopping power is provided by Brembo brakes and power is sent to the rear wheels through a 5-speed ZF automatic transmission.

The vehicle has a 3-seat layout with the driver seated in the middle, and a passenger seat on either side positioned slightly back from the driver's seat. Pininfarina was inspired for this design by the French made Matra Bagheera from the early 1970s. One of the particularly unusual details about this car is the cockpit door, which bears resemblance to the cockpit doors of fighter aircraft. The conventional two doors, windscreen and the better part of the roof found on an average car, have been transformed into a single opening canopy door which can be operated hydraulically via a remote control. Another feature is the complete lack of driving mirrors, there is an LCD screen mounted behind the steering wheel, which shows the driver a rear view from inside the vehicle. The Osée also featured Citroën's Hydroactive III suspension technology which allows the suspension height to be adjusted while driving.
