= 1100 Millecento =

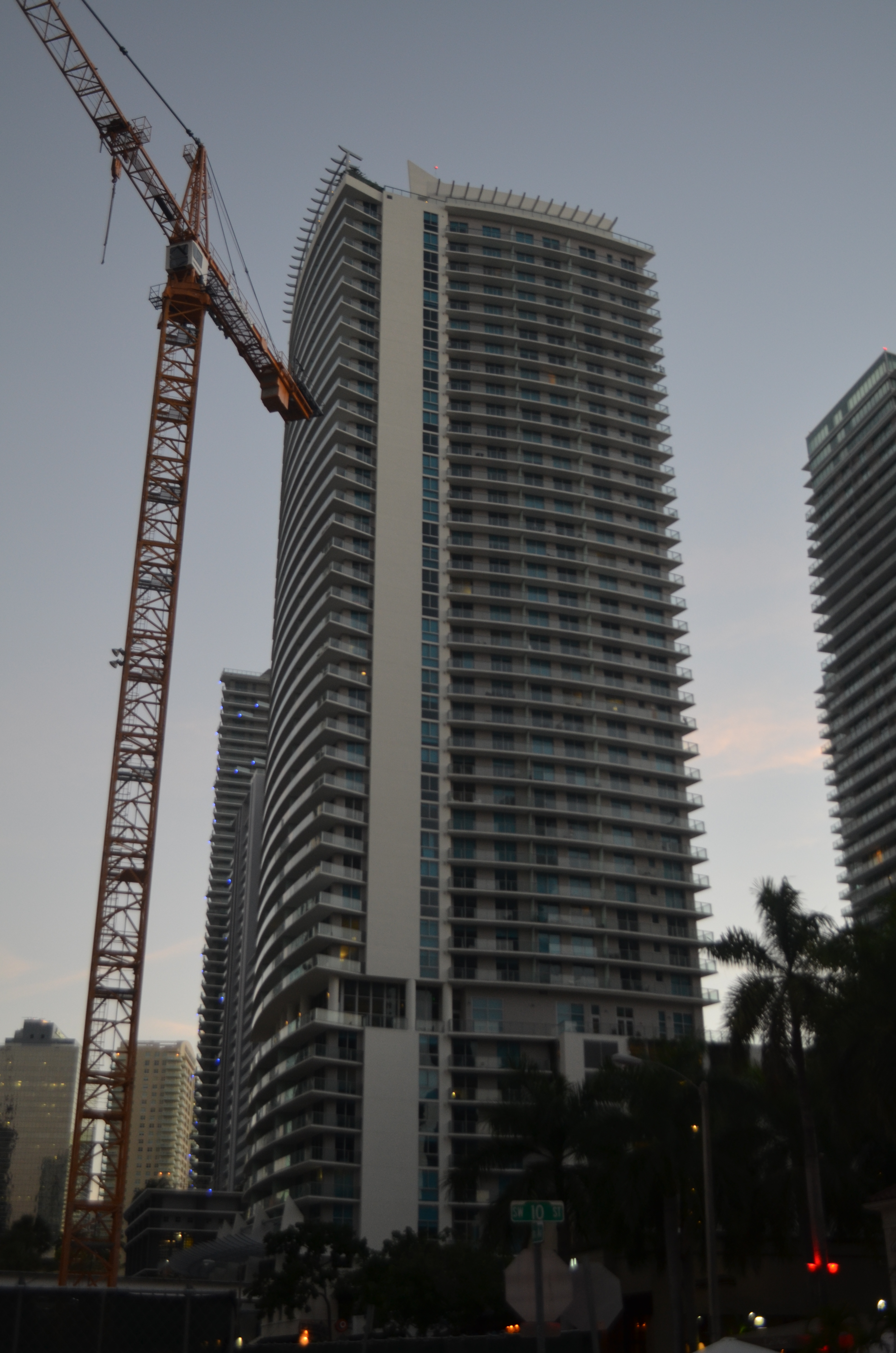
- Interactive map of the 1100 Millecento area

General information
- Status: Completed
- Type: Residential
- Location: 1100 South Miami Avenue, Miami, Florida, United States
- Coordinates: 25.763203°N 80.193430°W
- Construction started: October 2012
- Completed: February 2015

Height
- Roof: 418 ft (127 m)

Technical details
- Floor count: 42

Design and construction
- Architects: Carlos A. Ott, Pininfarina, Cohen, Freedman, Encinosa & Associates Architects

1100 Millecento (previously The Pointe at Brickell Village) is a high-rise residential building in the Brickell neighborhood of Miami, Florida. It rises to 470 feet (143 m) with 42 floors.

The Pointe was approved by the City of Miami and was scheduled to begin construction in late 2007. The building was planned to rise 442 feet (135 meters), with 42 floors. The Pointe at Brickell Village was one of several proposed residential developments during the city's recent "Manhattanization" wave. It was scheduled to be completed by 2009, but was cancelled due to the United States housing market correction.

== See also ==
- List of tallest buildings in Miami
