= Pininfarina Sergio =

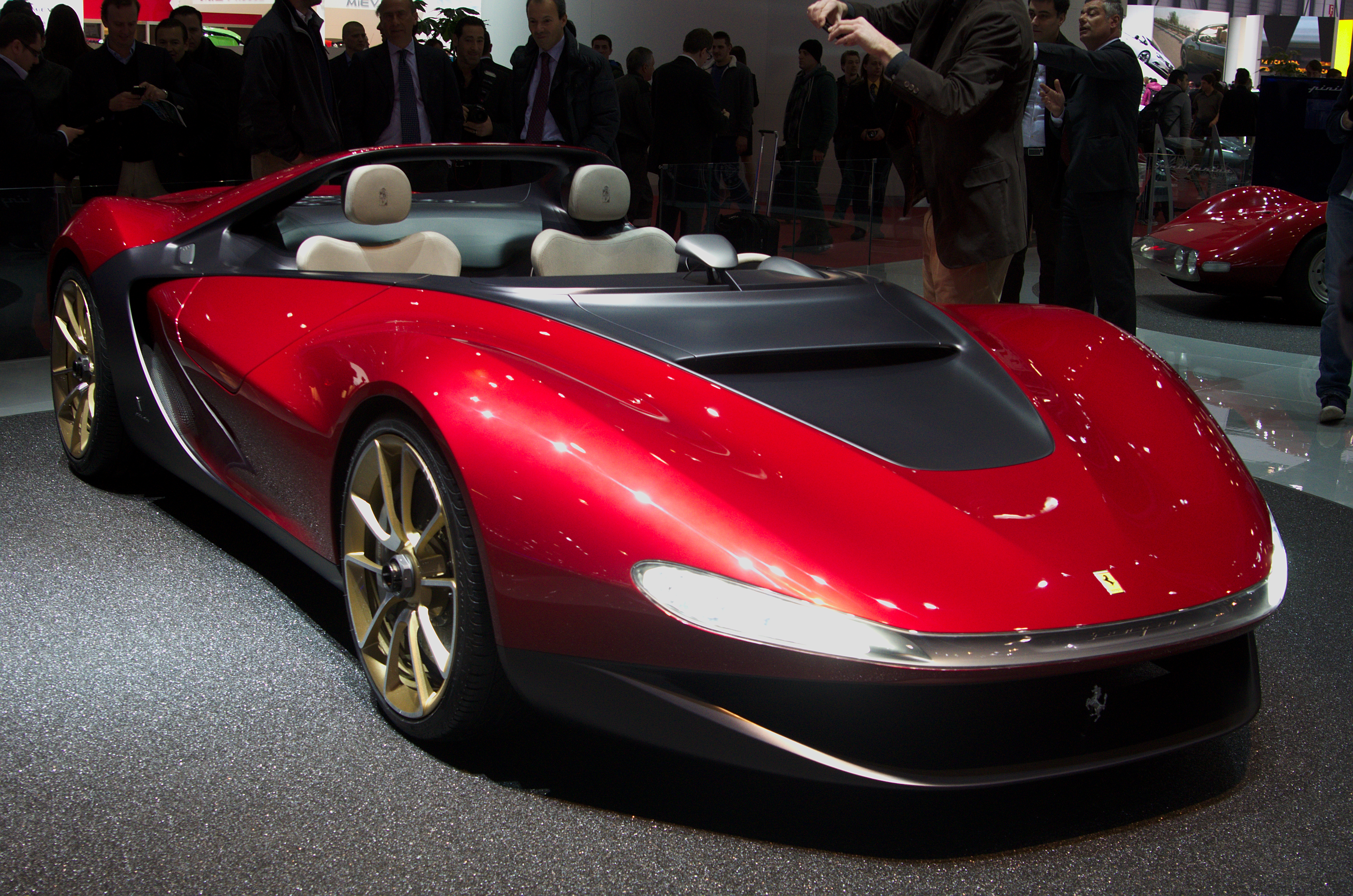
- The Pininfarina Sergio at the 2013 Geneva Motor Show

Overview
- Manufacturer: Pininfarina
- Production: 2013 (concept); 2015 (6 units)
- Assembly: Cambiano, Italy
- Designer: Fabio Filippini with Luca Borgogno at Pininfarina

Body and chassis
- Class: Sports car (S)
- Body style: 2-door barchetta
- Layout: Rear mid-engine, rear-wheel-drive
- Platform: Ferrari 458
- Doors: Swan

Powertrain
- Engine: 4.5 L Ferrari F136 F V8
- Transmission: 7-speed dual-clutch

Dimensions
- Wheelbase: 2,650 mm (104.3 in)
- Length: 4,550 mm (179.1 in)
- Width: 1,940 mm (76.4 in)
- Height: 1,140 mm (44.9 in)
- Curb weight: 1,280 kg (2,822 lb)

The Pininfarina Sergio is a concept car produced by the Italian design house Pininfarina. It was presented at the 2013 Geneva Motor Show as a tribute to the former chairman of the company and automotive designer, Sergio Pininfarina, who died on 3 July 2012. The car is a coach built barchetta which is based on the mechanical underpinnings of the Ferrari 458 Spider. The subsequent production variant was named Ferrari Sergio.

== Design ==
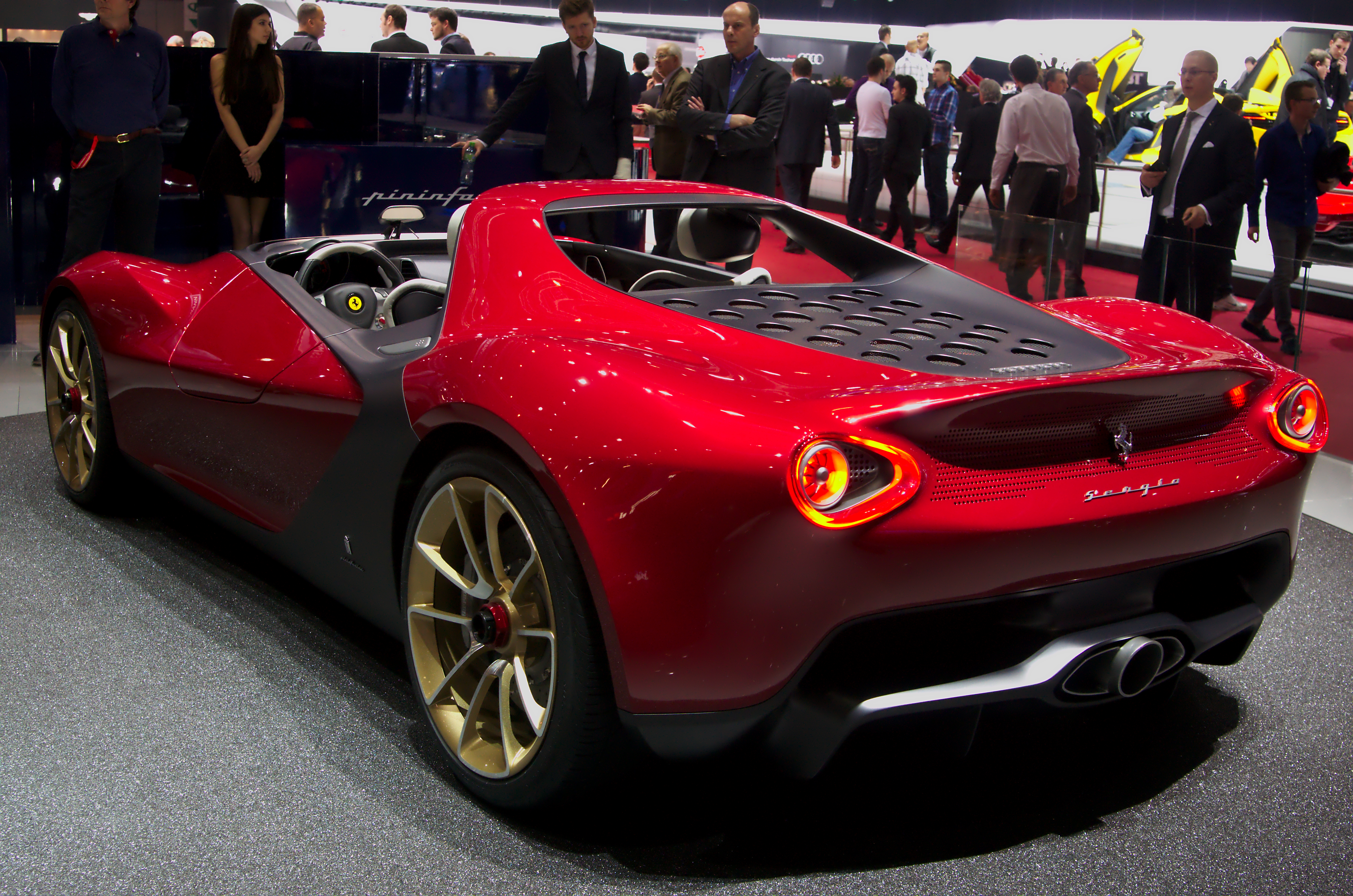
Pininfarina Sergio rear

The exterior design consists of floats and aerodynamic headrests which are attached to the roll bar rather than the body of the seats, becoming almost elements of the exterior more than the interior. In front of the door panel, two helmets are housed in a storage locker which are produced by Pininfarina in collaboration with Newmax and are personalised with the colour of the exterior. The open top body is designed with calculations and tests in the wind tunnel of Grugliasco to optimize aerodynamic performance. In particular, the full carbon body work results in weight savings of approximately 10% (150 lbs) over the aluminium body panels of the donor car. Other elements include unique 21" light alloy wheels by monodado with hub caps derived from Ferrari 458 Challenge, bespoke engine cover incorporating round holes inspired by the Ferrari Modulo and the elimination of a windshield which when combined with the car's air foil shaped front and by the use of a virtual windshield deploying at 31 mph (50 km/h) along with winglets incorporated in the front bumper, allows the arrival of a stream of air increasing with the speed of the car on the head of the driver and the passenger thereby increasing the car's aerodynamic character.

Taking cues from the 1965 Dino Berlinetta Speciale prototype which was the first solo project of Sergio Pininfarina from Ferrari as well as the Mythos and the Modulo concept cars, the design of the car is a simple open top car displaying design purity through the use of simple and sensual elements.

The reduction in weight and the incorporation of unique aerodynamic design elements enable the car to accelerate from 0–62 mph (100 km/h) in 3.4 seconds.

== Production ==
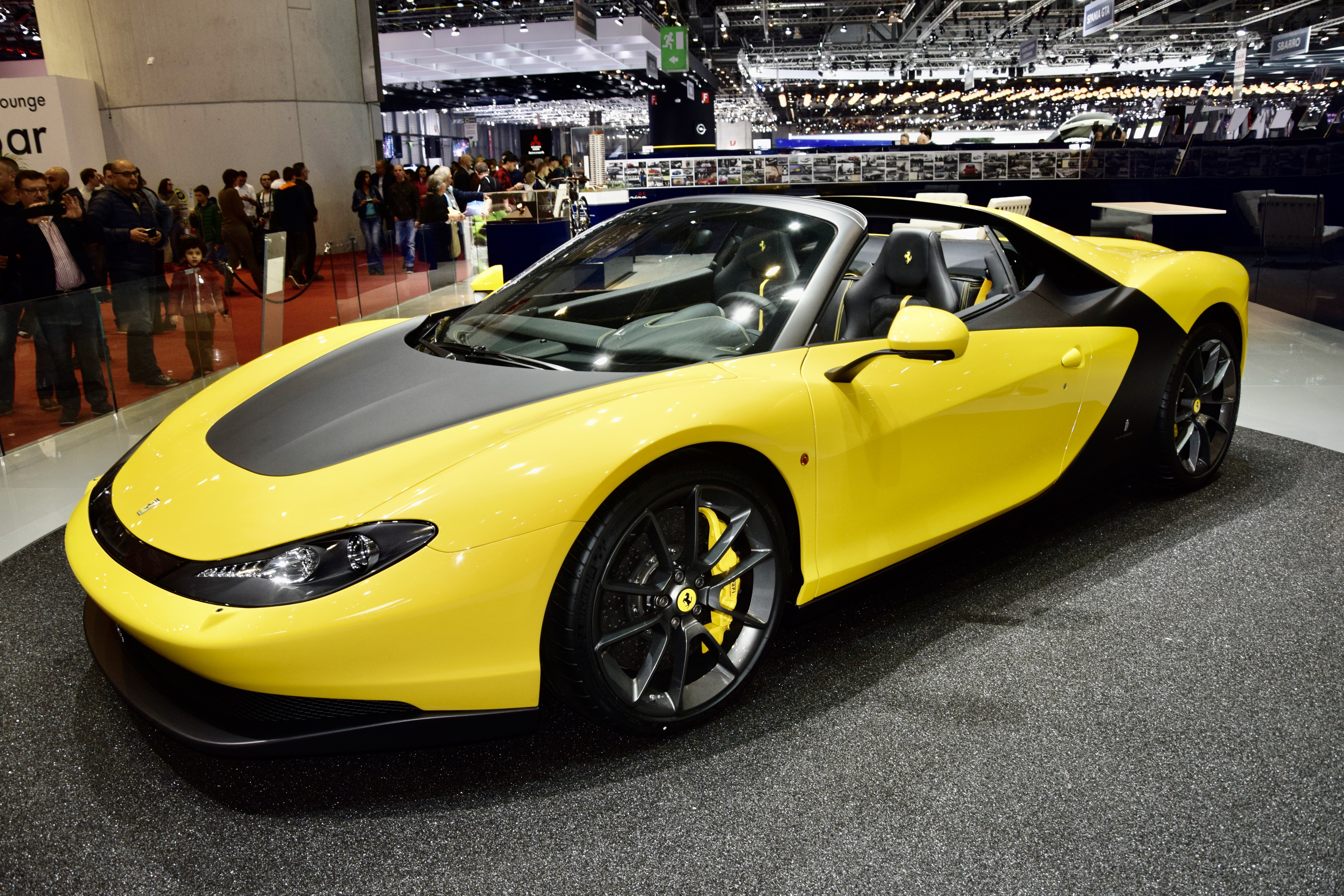
Ferrari Sergio at the 2015 Geneva Motor Show

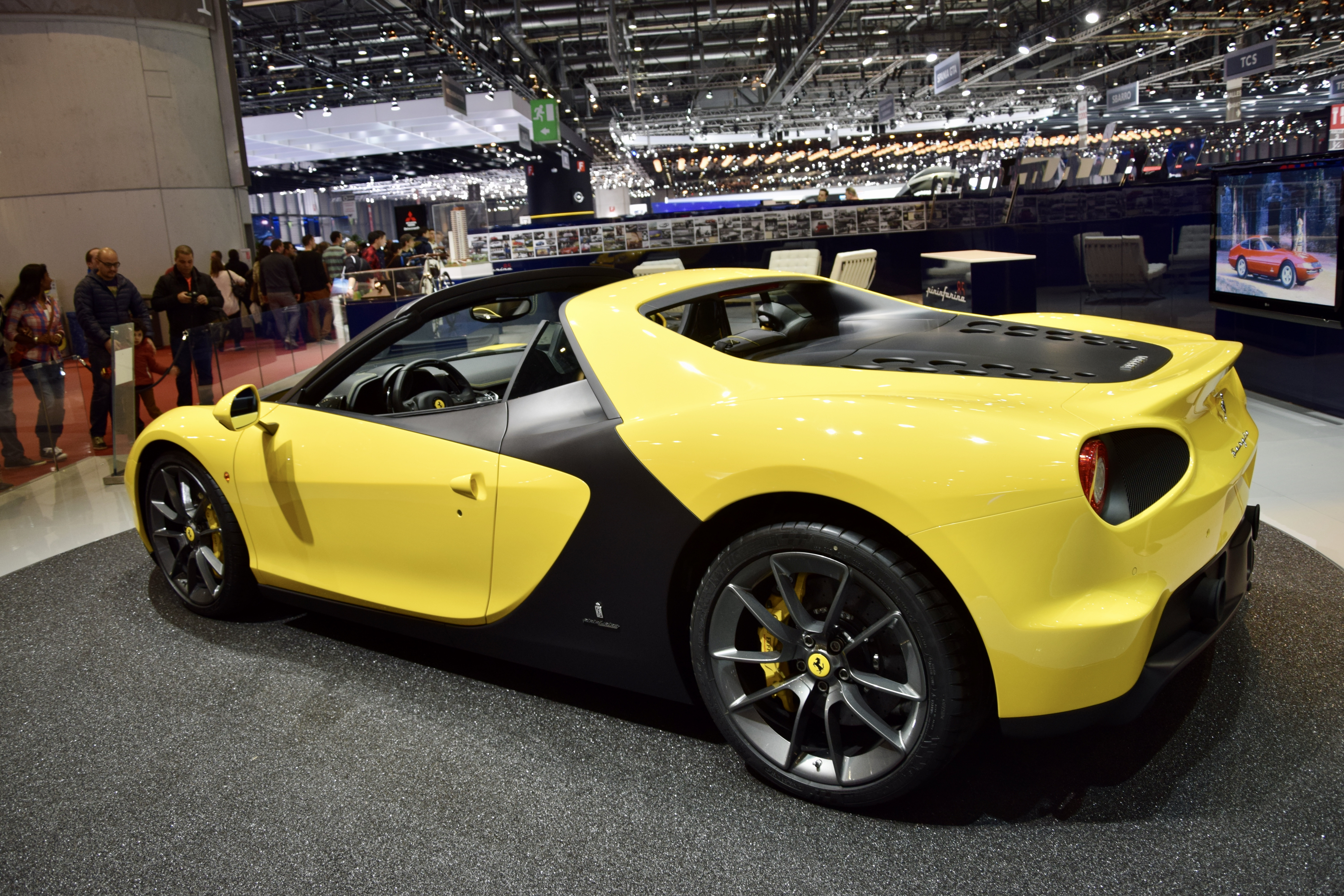
Ferrari Sergio rear view

Ferrari built six units of the Sergio starting in 2015 and sold it to handpicked customers. The production version consists of heavy modifications over the concept with the most noticeable being the addition of the windshield along with a removable hard top. The headrests are no longer incorporated in the roll bar and the car now shares many components with its donor including the interior, tail lights, indicators and the side view mirrors. Performance remains the same as the donor car. Each unit reportedly cost US$3,000,000.
