= Fabio Filippini =

Italian car designer

Fabio Filippini (born in Ghislarengo, VC, 1963) is an Italian car designer. Former Design Director of Pininfarina, is currently an independent Car Design consultant and Design Strategy advisor.

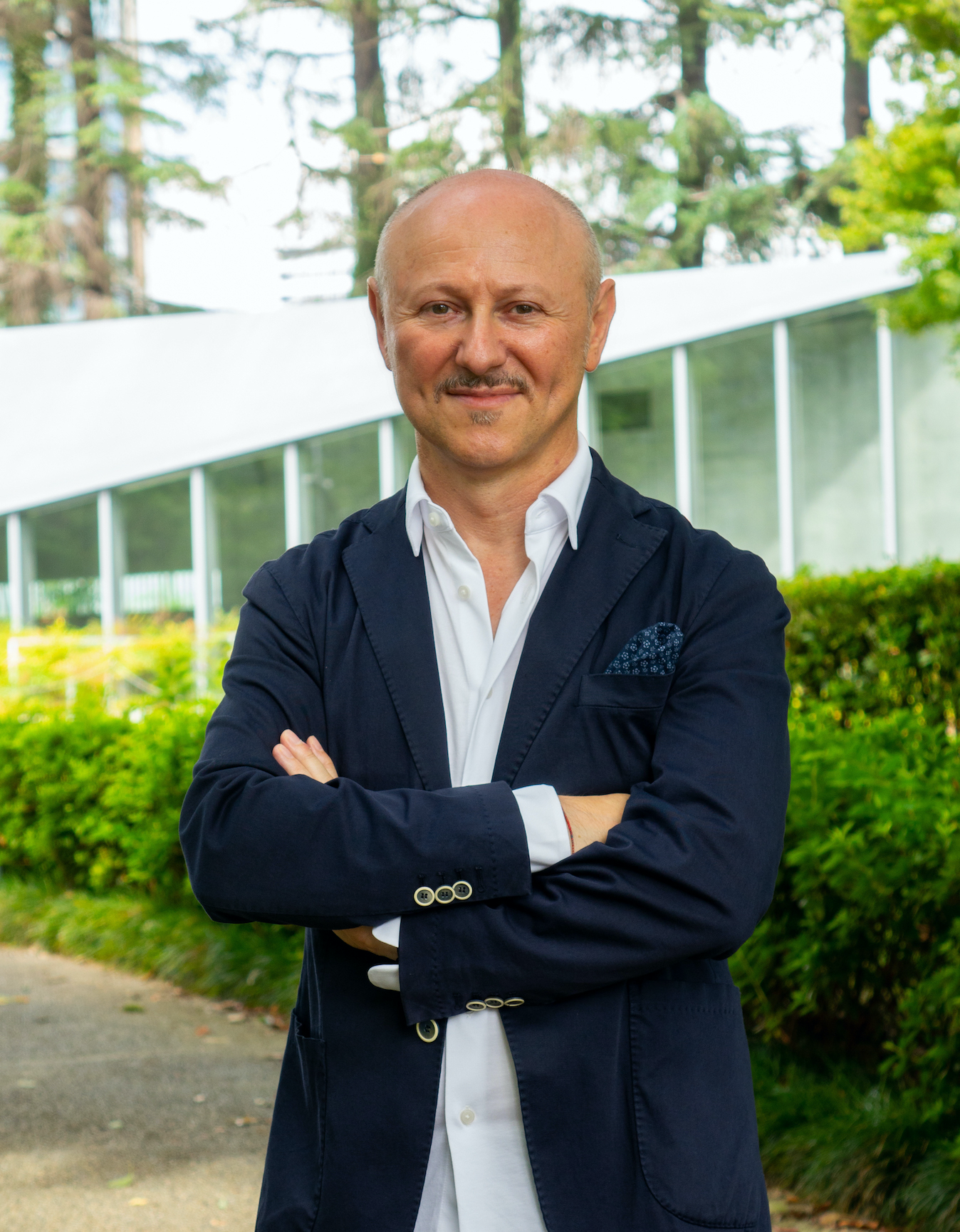

== Background ==
Graduate in Car Design, in 1983, at Scuola d'Arte Applicata e Design in Torino, followed in 1989 by a master's degree with Honors, in Architecture and Industrial Design at Politecnico di Milano.

== Career ==
He started his design career in 1985 at Open Design in Torino, an independent studio created by Aldo Sessano, working on various design projects for clients as Mitsubishi Motors, SEAT and Scania, among others.

In 1989, he moved to Japan to work at Design Club International, in Hakone. This 4-year long experience gave him the opportunity to work in many design projects for Japanese and European car manufacturer, and at the same time learning about Japanese culture and sense of aesthetic.

In 1993, Fabio Filippini joined Renault Design Industriel, under Patrick Le Quément, at the Advanced Design department in Boulogne Billancourt. He worked on advanced research programs, designing the interior of the Renault Initiale Paris concept car, presented in world premiere in September 1995 at Bagatelle's Louis Vuitton Classic, and immediately after at Frankfurt IAA. Consequently, he moved to the Interior Design department at Rueil Malmaison, and later at the newly created Technocentre, in Guyancourt.

In 1997 he joined Volkswagen-Audi Group at their Design Center Europe, in Sitges (Spain). As Interior Design Supervisor, he designed various advanced project for the different brands of the group; in particular he worked on the interior proposal for the Audi A8 (2nd gen.), subsequently developed by the Ingolstadt design team.

In 2000 Filippini returned to Renault Design, becoming in 2002 Director of Renault Design Paris, creating the new satellite studio located at Bastille. During five years of his tenure, he managed a 30 people design team, working on many advanced design programs (Laguna III, Kangoo II) and developing the advanced research for the whole new Mégane III (W95) platform. He returned to Technocentre in 2006, to take full responsibility as Design Director of the M1 Range, designing and developing with his team the whole Mégane/Scénic III production family of cars (X95). In 2008 he was appointed Vice-President Interior Design, redefining the Interior Design Strategy of Renault Group, and managing the interior design of the whole new range of products developed under Laurens Van den Acker (Renault Clio IV, Zoé, Captur, Twingo III and Espace V; Dacia Duster ph2, Lodgy/Dokker, Logan 2, Sandero 2). In parallel of his main design responsibilities, he has been member of the executive Joint Design Policy Group, between Renault/Nissan Design's organisations, as well as responsible for the operations of Renault Design America Latina's studio in Sao Paulo, Brasil.

In 2011 he became Vice President Design - Chief Creative Officer at Pininfarina, in Cambiano. During his six-year's long design leadership, Pininfarina Design team has created many remarkable award-winning concept cars: Pininfarina Cambiano, Pininfarina Sergio, BMW Pininfarina Gran Lusso Coupe, Pininfarina H2Speed (the first full-hydrogen track car), as well as designing production cars projects for worldwide major OEMs and Premium Brands, including other transportation vehicles, like the Eurostar e320 train and the Zetor Concept Tractor. His latest works at Pininfarina are the concepts Fittipaldi EF7 Vision Gran Turismo and Hybrid Kinetic H600, presented at the Geneva Motor Show 2017.

In 2018 he moved to Tokyo, working internationally as independent Car Designer and Design Strategy advisor.

Besides his professional design activity, Fabio Filippini serves as international judge at the most renown classic car's concours in the world, such as Pebble Beach Concours d'Elegance, in California, Salon Privé in England, Chantilly Art & Elegance in France, and The Peninsula Classic Best of the Best Award.

== Design ==
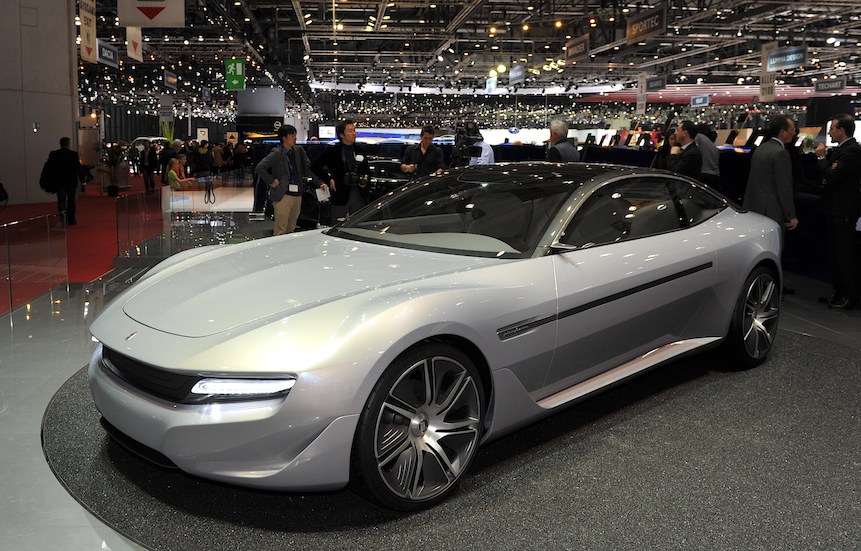
Pininfarina Cambiano Concept

- Renault Initiale Paris Concept (1995)
- Renault Kangoo II (2007)
- Renault Mégane III (2008)
- Renault Scénic III (2009)
- Pininfarina Cambiano Concept (2012)

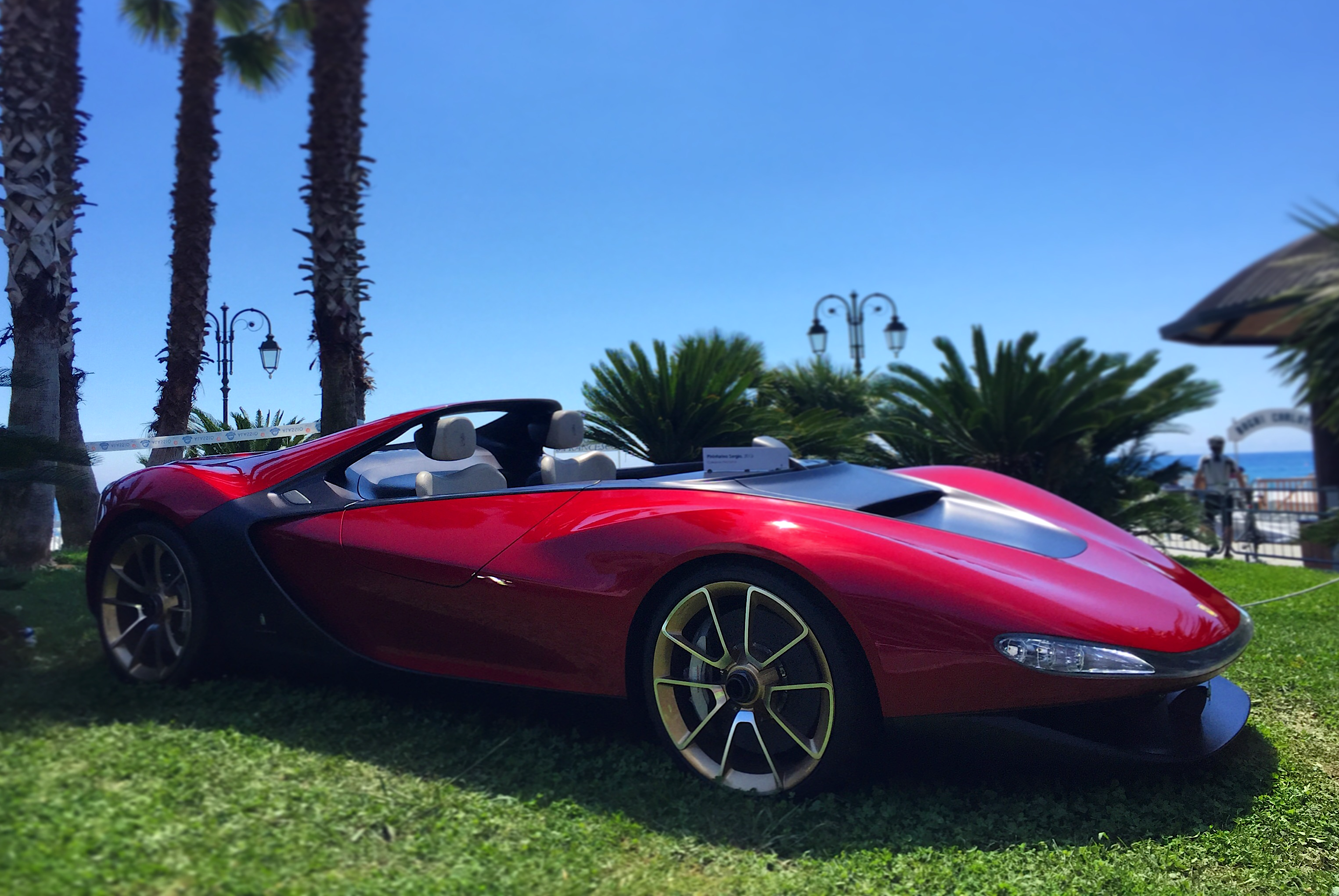
Pininfarina Sergio Concept

- Pininfarina Sergio Concept (2013)

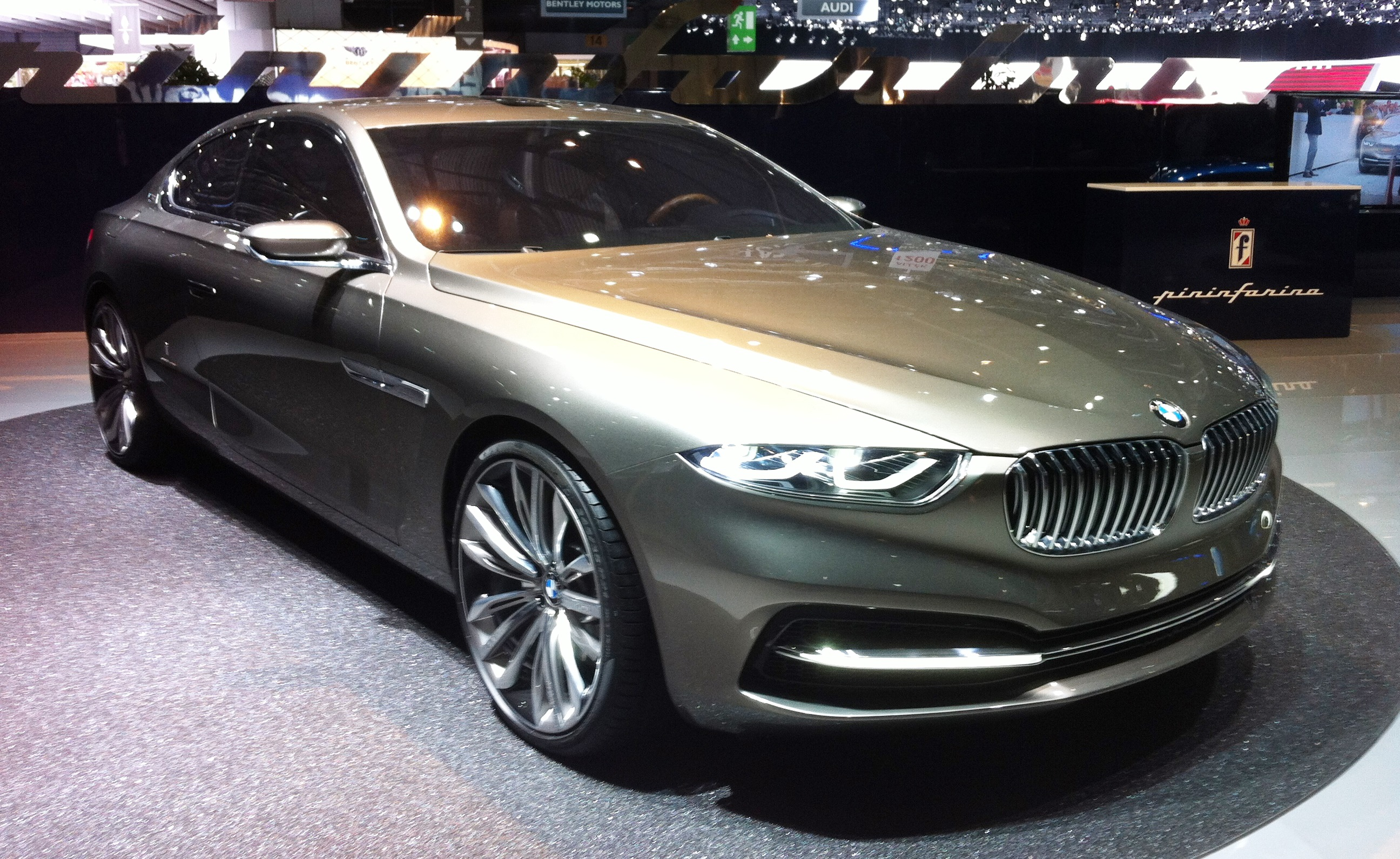
BMW Pininfarina Gran Lusso Coupe

- BMW Pininfarina Gran Lusso Coupe (2013)

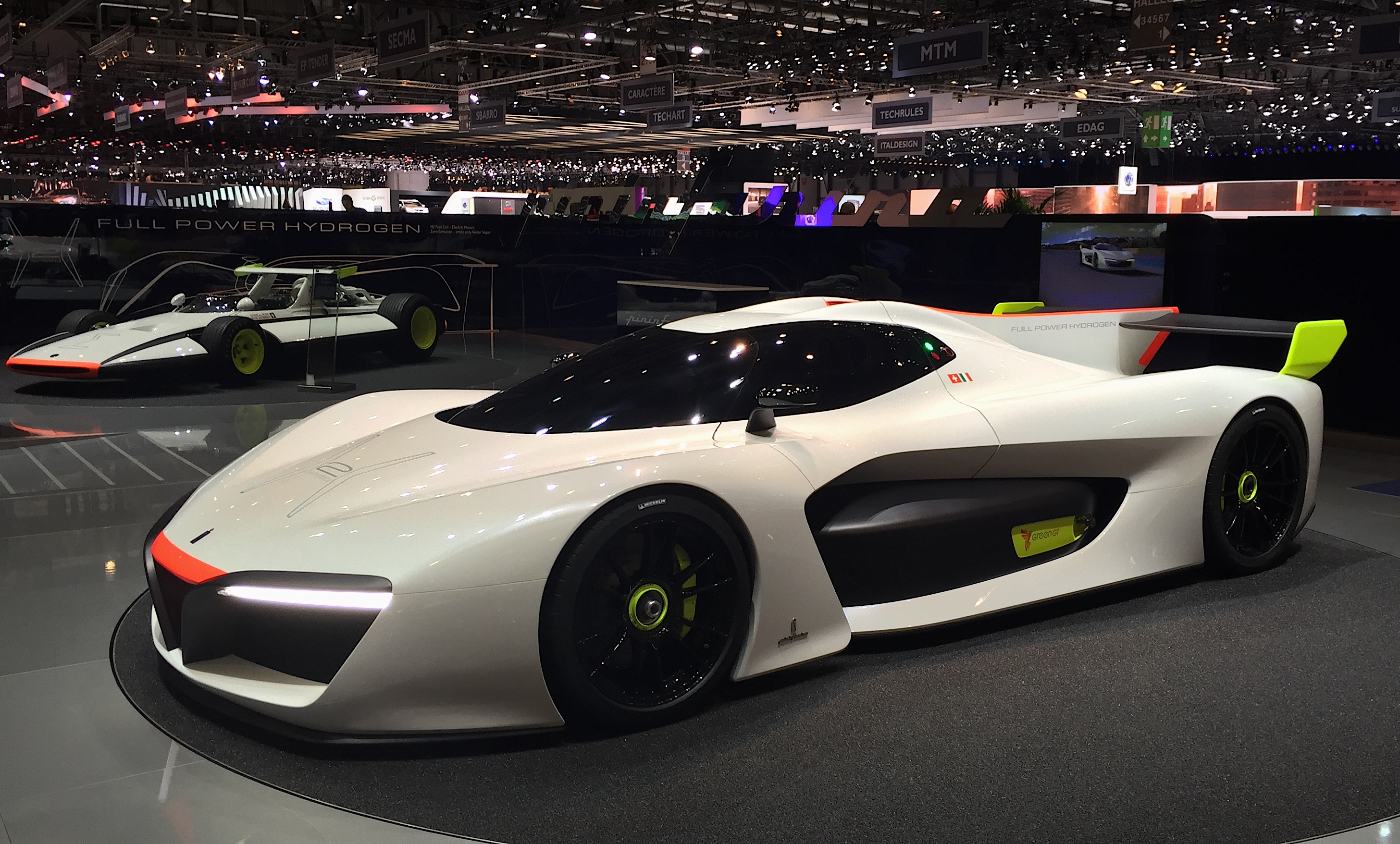
Pininfarina H2Speed Concept

- Pininfarina H2Speed Concept (2016)

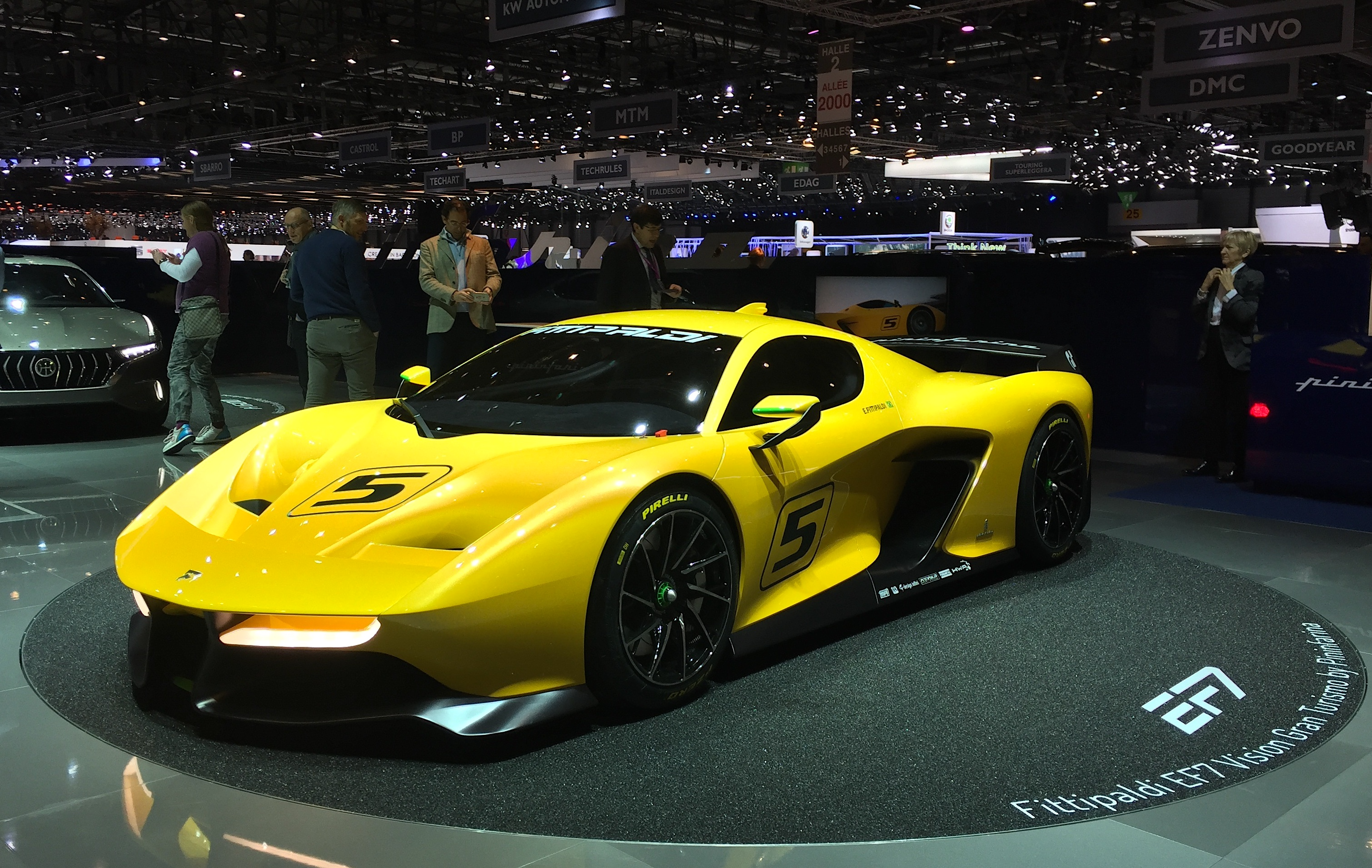
Fittipaldi EF7 Vision Gran Turismo by Pininfarina

- Fittipaldi EF7 Vision Gran Turismo by Pininfarina (2017)

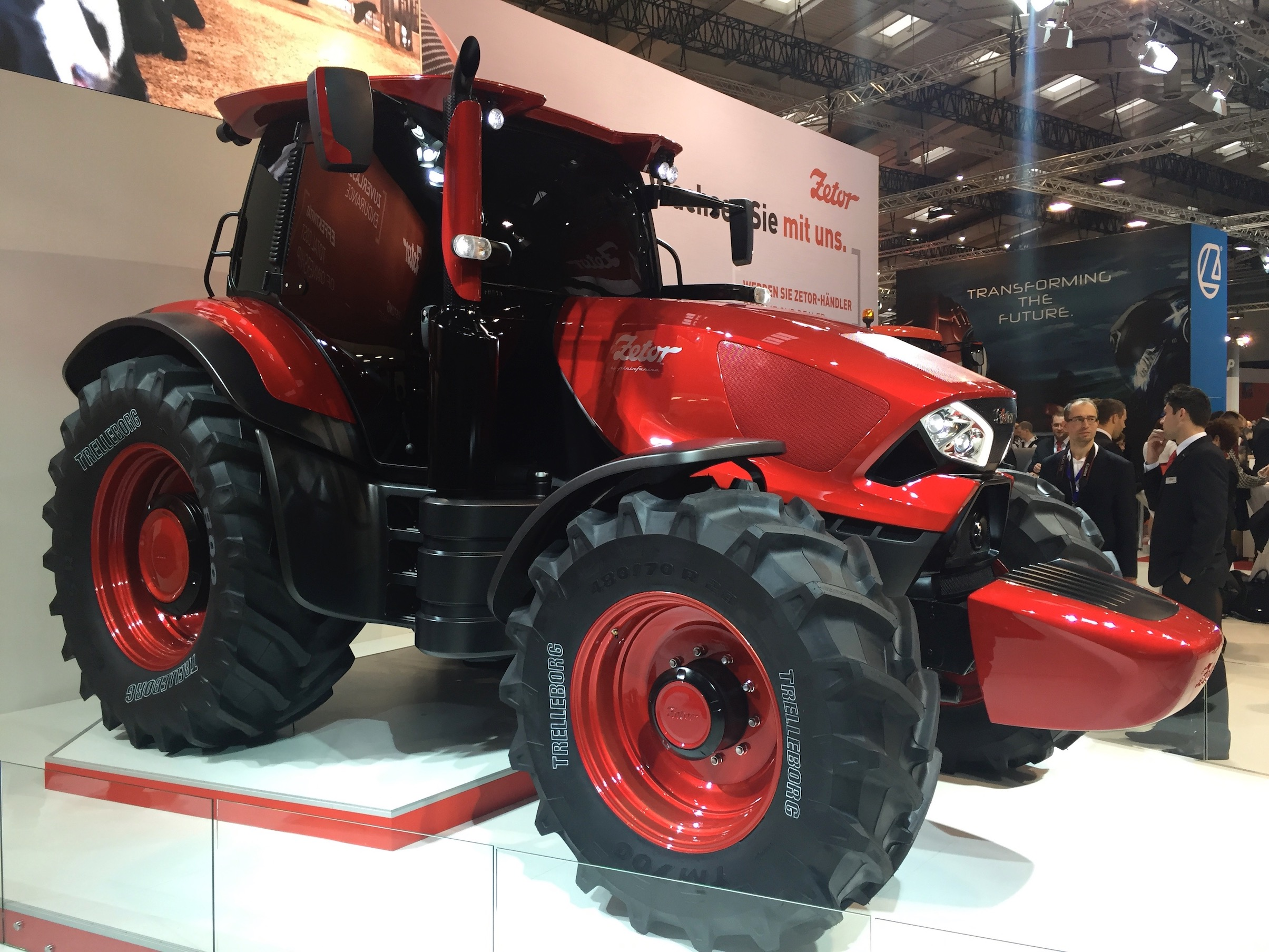
Zetor Concept Tractor by Pininfarina

- Pininfarina HK H600 (2017)
- Zetor Concept Tractor by Pininfarina (2015)

== Awards ==
- "Car Design Award" 1996 (Renault Initiale Paris Concept)
- "Interior Design of the Year" Automotive Interiors Expo 2012 Awards (Pininfarina Cambiano Concept)
- "Premio per l'Innovazione ADI" Design Index 2013 (Pininfarina Cambiano Concept)
- Compasso d'Oro ADI "Honorable mention" 2014 (Pininfarina Cambiano Concept)
- "Best Design Study" Autonis Design Awards 2013 (Pininfarina Sergio Concept)
- "Good Design Award" 2013 (Bmw Pininfarina GranLusso Coupe)
- "Concept Car of the Year Award" by Automobile magazine US (Pininfarina H2Speed Concept)
