= Ferrari F50 =

Italian sports car produced by Ferrari from 1995–1997

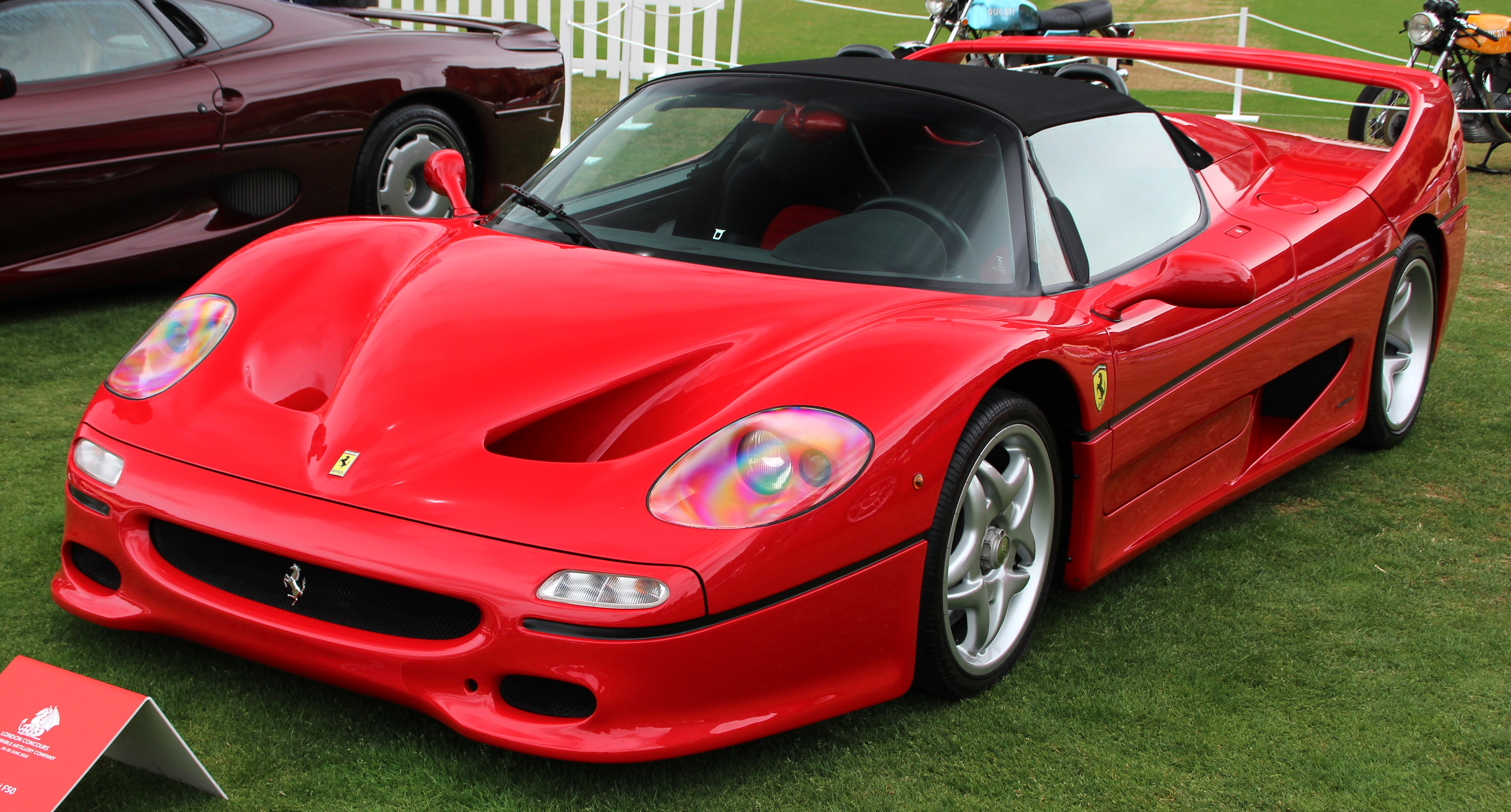
- Ferrari F50

Overview
- Manufacturer: Ferrari S.p.A.
- Model code: Type F130
- Production: 1995–1997; 349 produced
- Assembly: Italy: Maranello
- Designer: Pietro Camardella and Lorenzo Ramaciotti at Pininfarina

Body and chassis
- Class: Sports car (S)
- Body style: 2-door targa top
- Layout: Rear mid-engine, rear-wheel-drive
- Related: Ferrari 333 SP

Powertrain
- Engine: 4.7L DOHC 65 degree Tipo F130B V12
- Power output: 382 kW (520 PS; 513 hp)
- Transmission: 6-speed manual

Dimensions
- Wheelbase: 2,580 mm (101.6 in)
- Length: 4,480 mm (176.4 in)
- Width: 1,986 mm (78.2 in)
- Height: 1,120 mm (44.1 in)
- Curb weight: 1,230 kg (2,712 lb)

Chronology
- Predecessor: Ferrari F40
- Successor: Ferrari Enzo

The Ferrari F50 (Type F130) is a limited production mid-engine sports car manufactured by Italian automobile manufacturer Ferrari from 1995 until 1997. Introduced in 1995, the car is a two-door, two seat targa top. The F50 is powered by a 4.7 L naturally aspirated Tipo F130B 60-valve V12 engine that was developed from the 3.5 L V12 used in the 1990 Ferrari 641 Formula One car. The car's design is an evolution of the 1989 Ferrari Mythos concept car, while Pininfarina incorporated design cues from contemporary F1 racecar designs, particularly at the front.

A total of 349 cars were made, with the last car rolling off the production line in July 1997. The F50's engine predated the car; it was used in the Ferrari 333 SP for the American IMSA GT Championship in 1994, allowing it to become eligible for the stock engine World Sports Car category.

== Specifications ==
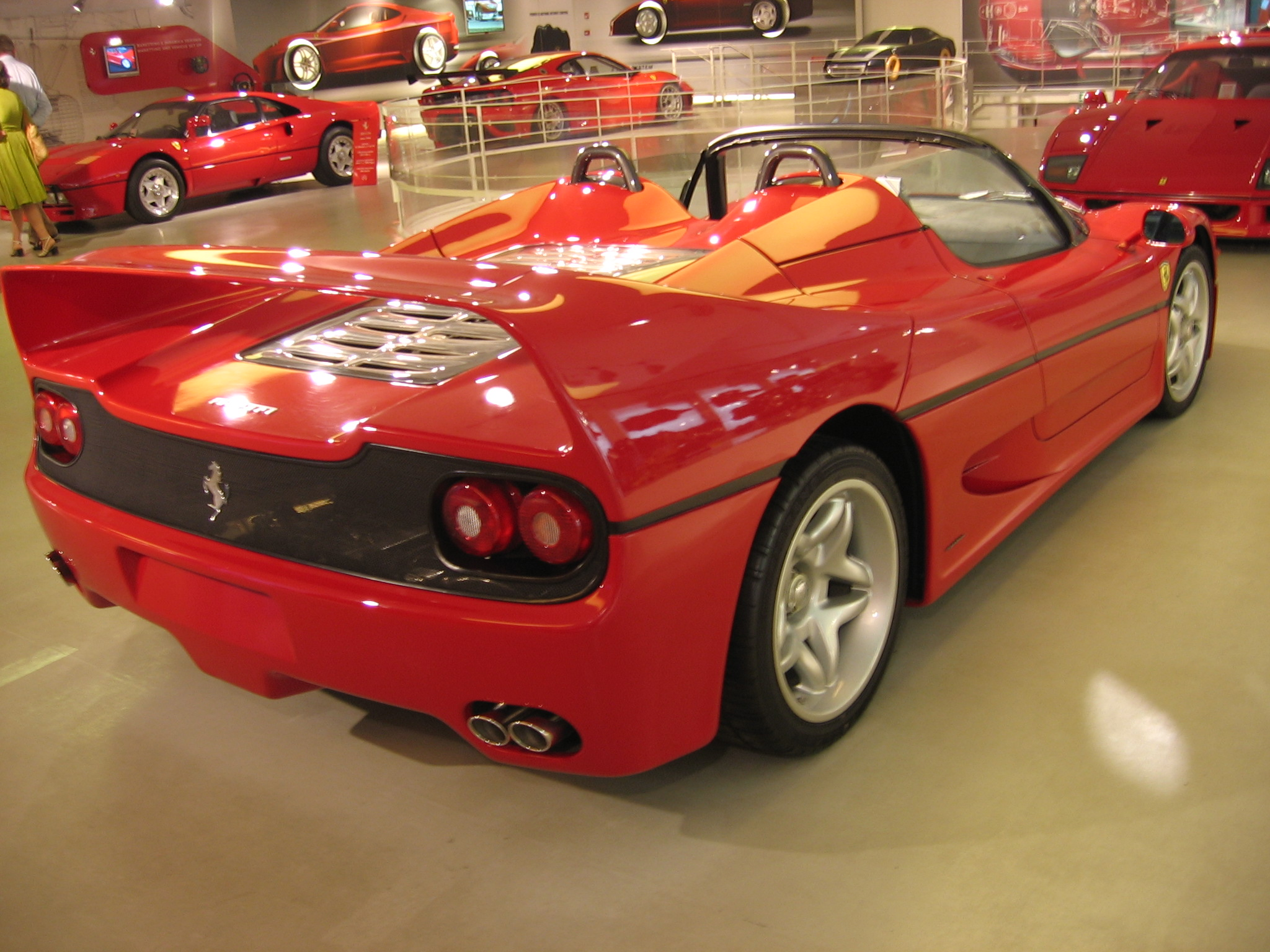
Rear view

=== Weight ===
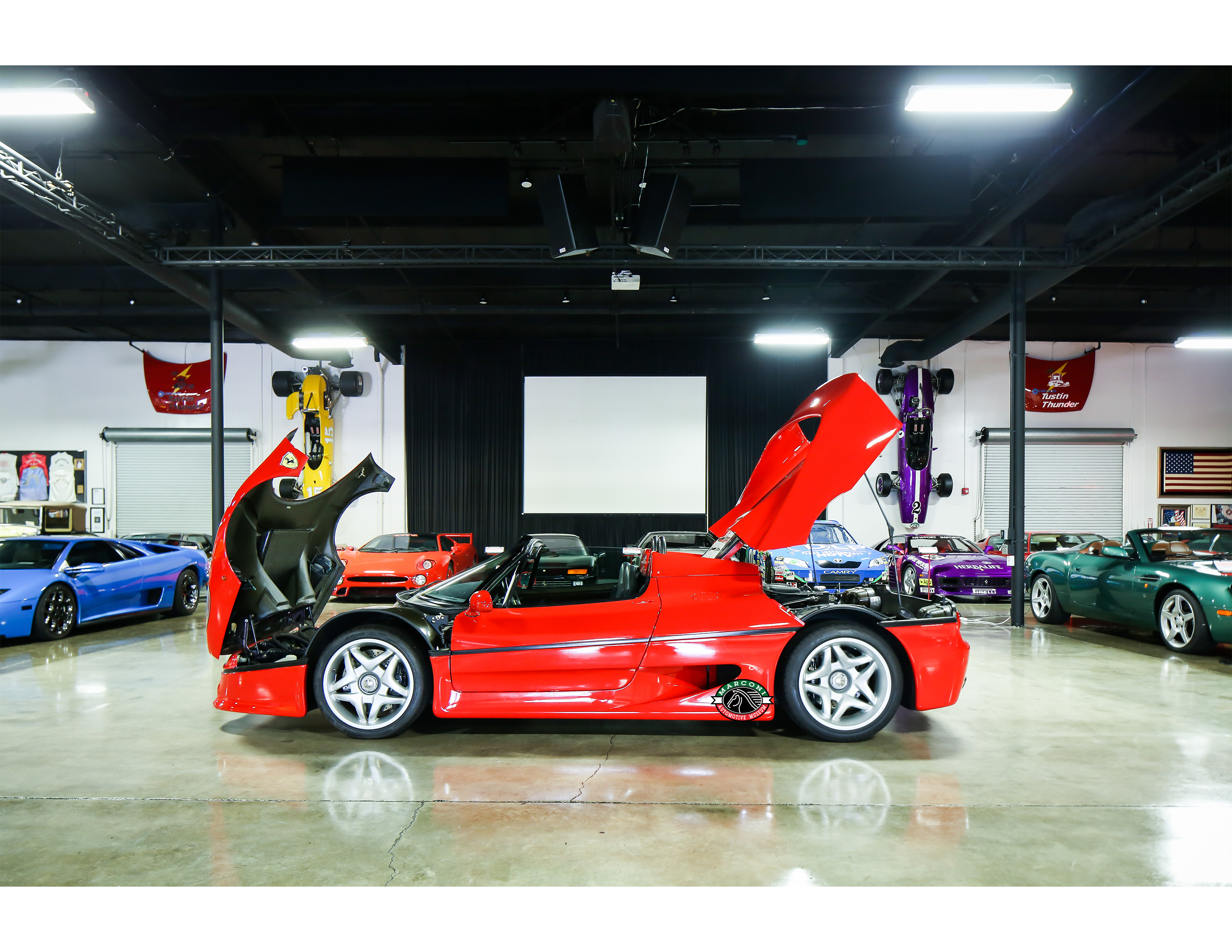
Ferrari F50 at the Marconi Automotive Museum

- Distribution: 42%/58% (front/rear)

=== Engine ===
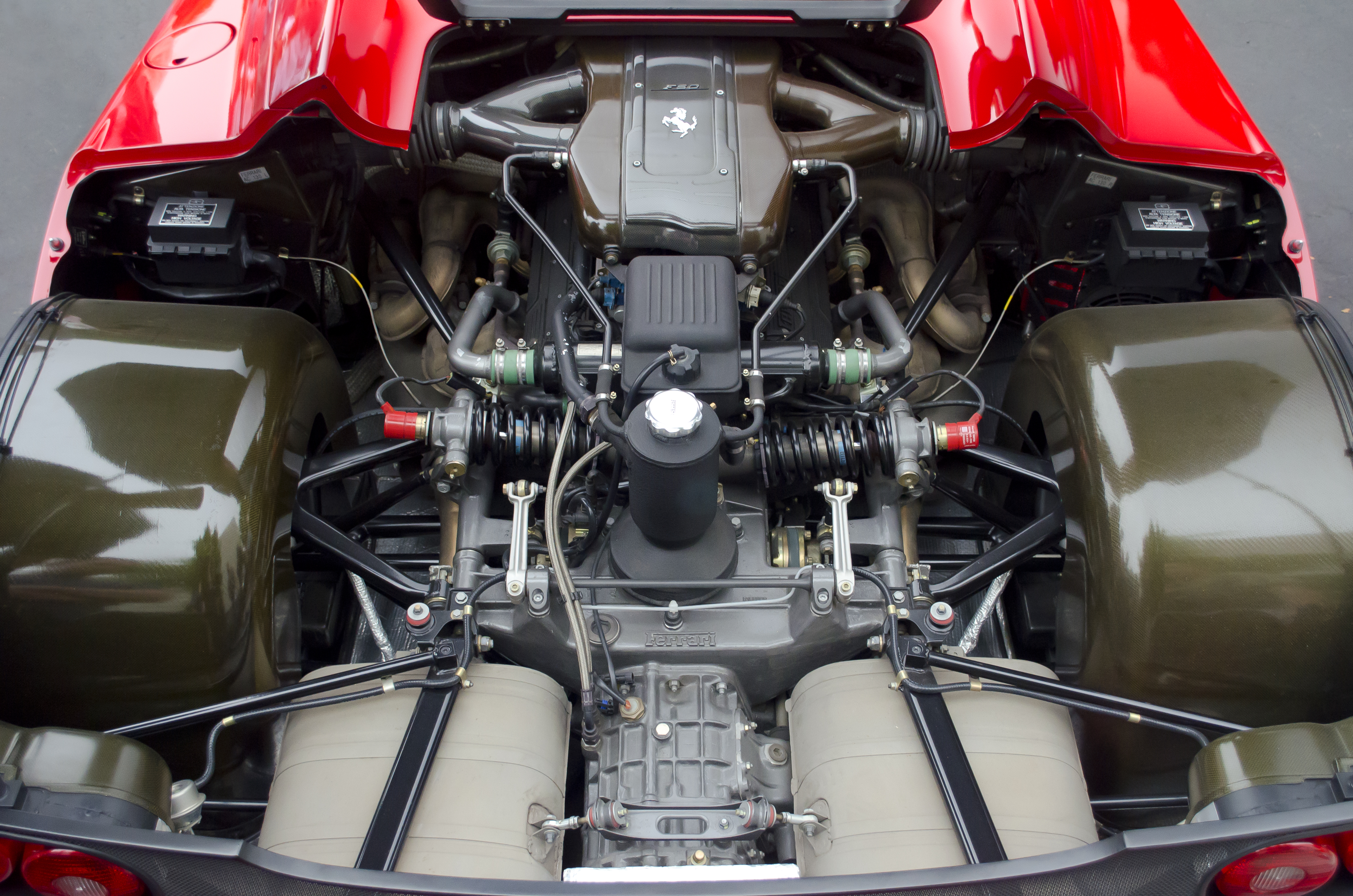
The 4.7-litre Tipo F130 B V12 engine

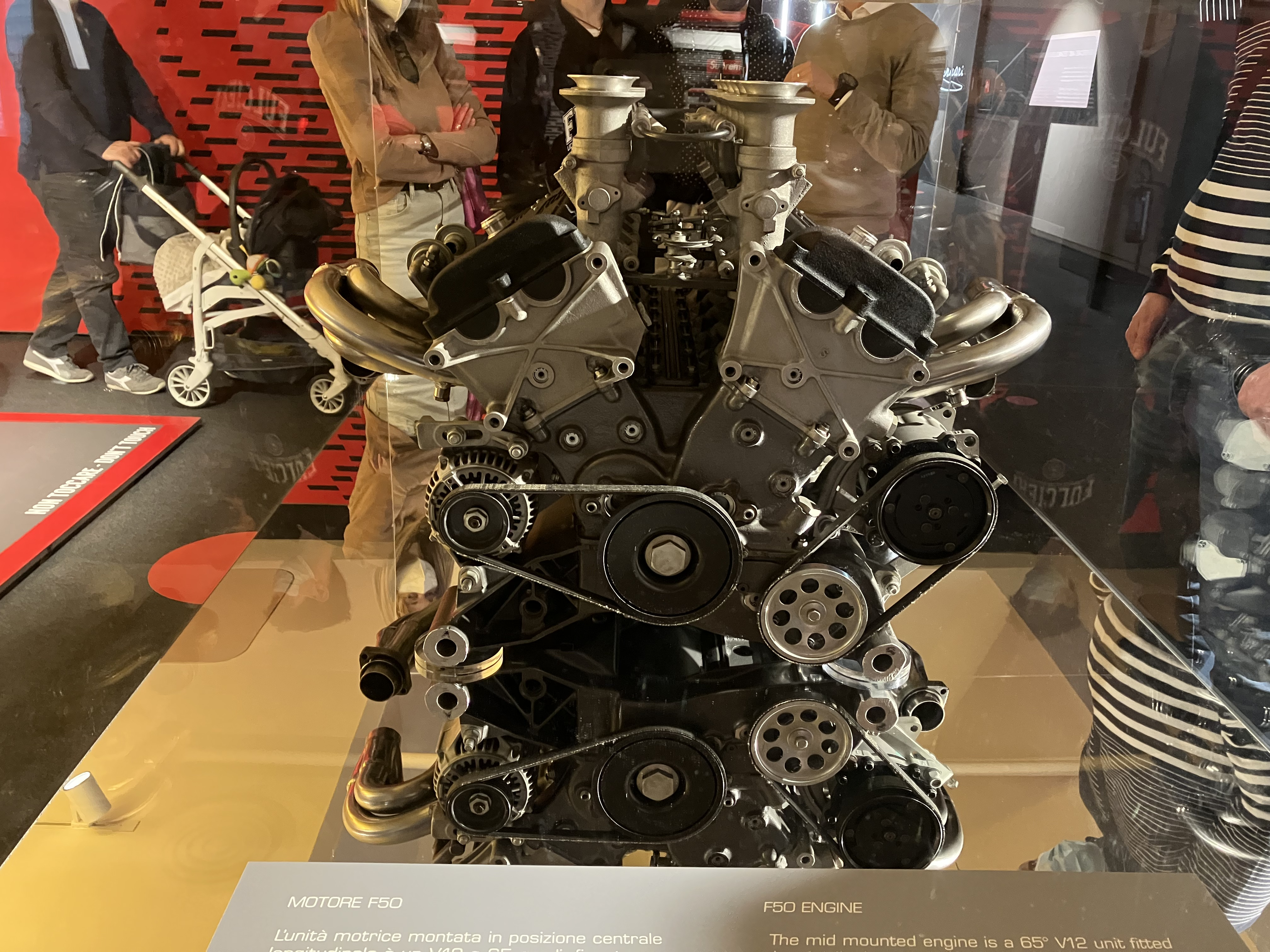
- F130 B at the Museo Ferrari
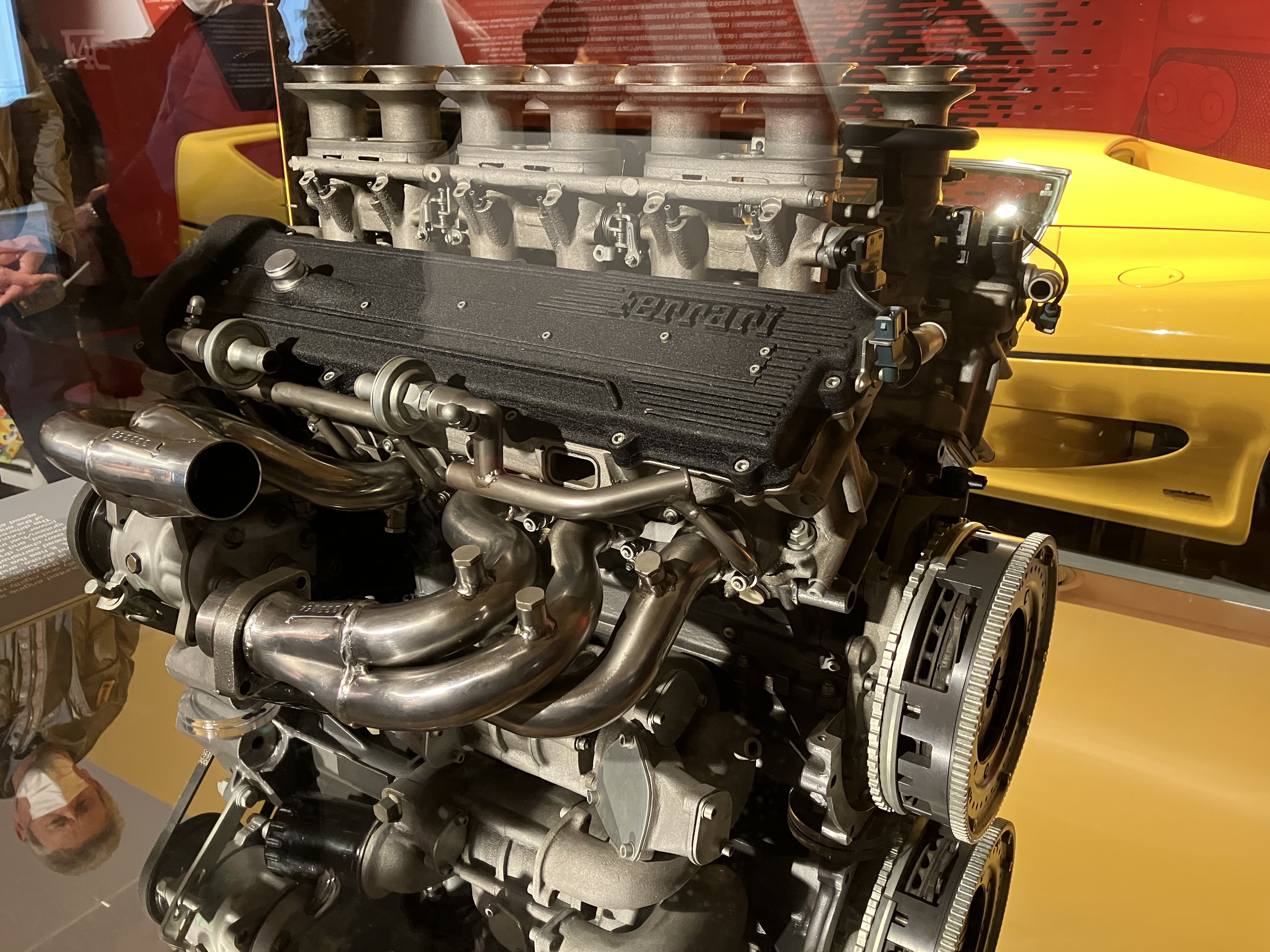
  F130 B
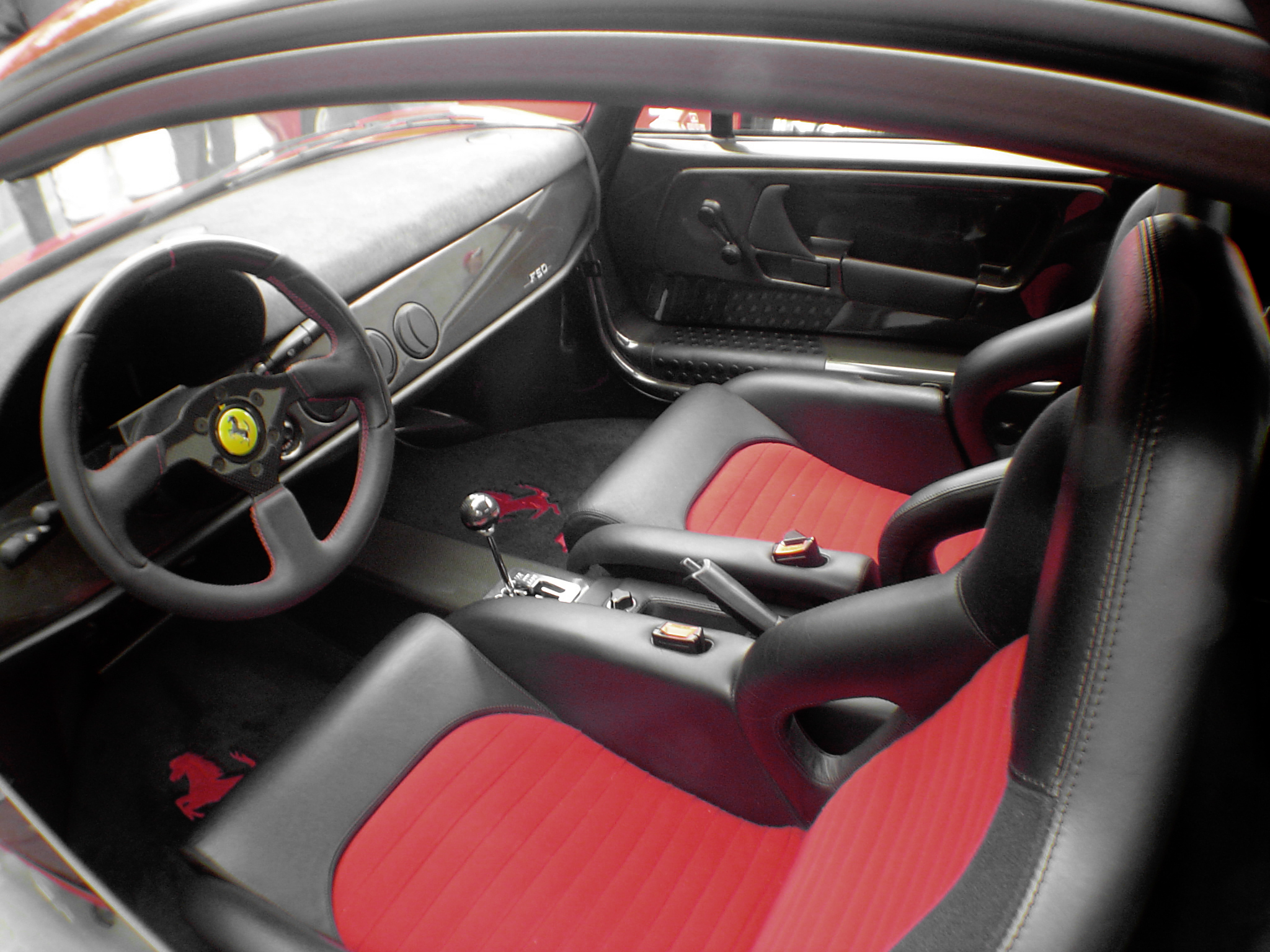
  Interior
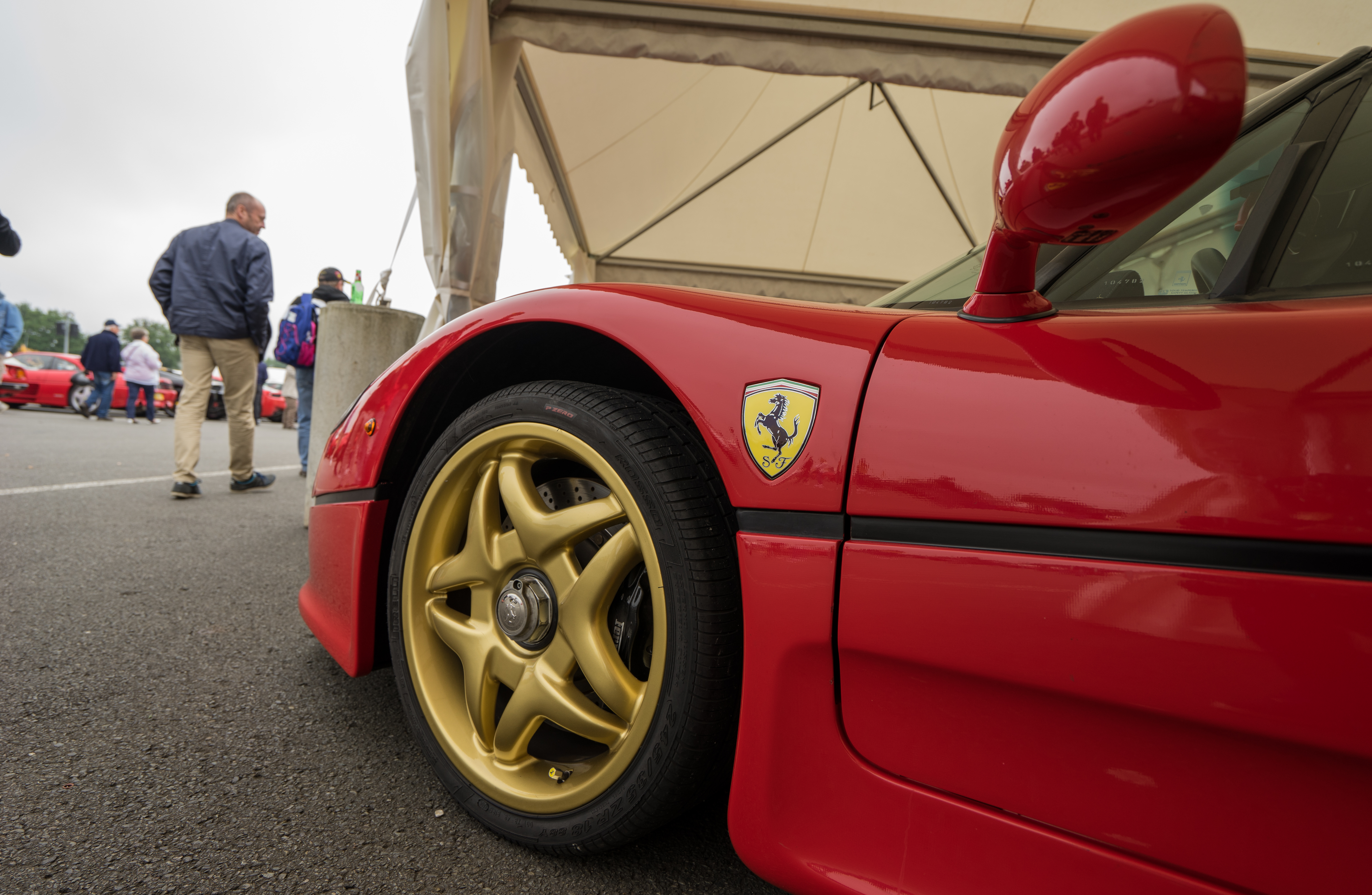
  The F50 had twin 5-spoke alloy wheels.
  Type: Tipo 036-derived, model SFE 4.7 VJGAEA, Tipo F130 B
- Position: rear mid-engine, rear-wheel-drive layout
- Configuration: longitudinally-mounted 65° V12
- Aspiration: naturally aspirated, with variable-length intake manifold via butterfly valve in intake manifold
  - Intake manifold: carbon fibre reinforced polymer
- Block: nodular cast iron
- Heads/pistons: light-alloy aluminum heads/forged Mahle pistons
- Oil sump: aluminium
- Connecting rods: forged titanium
- Crankshaft: forged steel
- Cam covers/oil and water pump housing: magnesium sand castings
- Exhaust manifold: stainless steel
- Engine weight: 198 kg (437 lb)
- Valvetrain: 5 valves per cylinder (3 intake, 2 exhaust), 60-valves (total) DOHC per cylinder bank driven by low-noise Morse chain
- Displacement: 4,698.50 cc (4.7 L; 286.7 cu in)
- Max. power: 382 kW (520 PS; 513 hp) at 8,500 rpm
- Max. torque: 471 N⋅m (48 kg⋅m; 347 lb⋅ft) at 6,500 rpm
- Specific output.: 81.3 kW (110.5 PS; 109.0 bhp)/litre
- Weight/power ratio: 2.69 kg/PS
- Bore X stroke: 85 mm × 69 mm (3.35 in × 2.72 in)
- Bore:stroke ratio: 1.23:1 (oversquare)
- Compression ratio: 11.3:1
- Redline: 8,500 rpm
- Fuel cutoff: 8,640 rpm
- Fuel feed: Bosch Motronic 2.7 sequential injection and Electronic control unit (controls the fuel feed, ignition timing, and variable length intake and exhaust systems)
- Ignition system: Bosch static electronic distributor-less ignition
- Lubrication: dry sump, tank incorporated within the final drive housing, 3 scavenger pumps
- Variable intake: butterfly valve in carbon fibre intake manifold closed at low rpm, open at high rpm
- Variable exhaust: butterfly valve in upper tailpipes closed at low rpm, open at high rpm
- Fuel tank: foam filled, aeronautical-style Sekur rubber bladder, 105 L (28 US gal; 23 imp gal)

=== Fuel consumption ===
- EPA premium gasoline
  - Combined 8 miles per U.S. gallon (29 L/100 km; 9.6 mpg_{‑imp})
  - City 7 miles per U.S. gallon (34 L/100 km; 8.4 mpg_{‑imp})
  - Highway 10 miles per U.S. gallon (24 L/100 km; 12 mpg_{‑imp})

=== Transmission ===
- Configuration: longitudinal 6-speed manual + reverse, limited-slip differential, RWD
- Gear ratios: 2.933:1 (1st), 2.157:1 (2nd), 1.681:1 (3rd), 1.360:1 (4th), 1.107:1 (5th), 0.903:1 (6th), 2.529:1 (reverse)
- Final drive: 3.70:1
  - Final drive assembly: aluminum sand casting
  - Remaining gearset housing: magnesium sand casting
  - Support bracing: steel
- Flywheel: steel
- Clutch: dry, twin plate
- Cooling: oil-water Oil cooler between gearbox lubricant and engine

=== Chassis ===
- Type: central carbon fiber tub, light-alloy suspension and engine-gearbox assembly mounting points co-polymerised to the chassis
- Materials: carbon fiber, epoxy resin, Nomex honeycomb structure core, sandwich construction
- Torsional stiffness: 34,570 N⋅m (25,500 lb⋅ft) per degree

=== Suspension ===
- Front: Rose-jointed unequal-length wishbones, push-rods, coil springs, Bilstein gas-pressurised monotube dampers, electronic adaptive damping, electronic height adjustment (40 mm max)
- Rear: Rose-jointed unequal-length wishbones, push-rods, coil springs, Bilstein gas-pressurised monotube dampers, electronic adaptive damping, mounting points on a spacer between the engine and gearbox
- Travel: 55 mm bump, 60 mm rebound
- Camber angle: -0.7 degrees front, -1.0 degrees rear
- Anti-roll bars: front and rear
- Max. roll angle: 1.5 degrees
- Electronic adaptive damping (based on steering wheel angle and velocity, the body's vertical and longitudinal acceleration, brake line pressure, and vehicle speed)
- Maximum reaction time (from minimum to maximum damping force or vice versa): 140 milliseconds (0.14 s)
- Average reaction time (from minimum to maximum damping force or vice versa): 25 to 30 milliseconds (0.025 to 0.03 s)

=== Steering ===
- Type: TRW rack and pinion, 3.3 turns lock-to-lock, unassisted
- Caster angle: 5.5 to 5.7 degrees
- Turning circle: 41 ft (12 m)

=== Wheels/tires/brakes ===
- Wheels: magnesium alloy, manufactured by Speedline
- Hubs: titanium
- Disc brake bells/suspension uprights/brake calipers: aluminum
- Upper and lower wishbones: black powder-coated steel
- Front wheels: 8.5 in × 18 in (220 mm × 460 mm)
- Front tires: 245/35ZR-18 Goodyear Eagle F1 GS Fiorano at 35 psi (240 kPa)
- Front brakes: Brembo cross-drilled & ventilated cast iron discs, 4 piston aluminum Brembo calipers, Pagid brake pads, (without ABS)
- Rear wheels: 13 in × 18 in (330 mm × 460 mm)
- Rear tires: 335/30ZR-18 Goodyear Eagle F1 GS Fiorano at 30 psi (210 kPa)
- Rear brakes: Brembo cross-drilled & ventilated cast iron discs, 4 piston aluminum Brembo calipers, Pagid brake pads, (without ABS)
- Unsprung mass: 99 lb/121 lb (front corners/rear corners)

=== Colour popularity ===
- Rosso Corsa (red): 302
- Giallo Modena (yellow): 31
- Rosso Barchetta (dark red): 8
- Argento Nurburgring (silver): 4
- Nero Daytona (black): 4
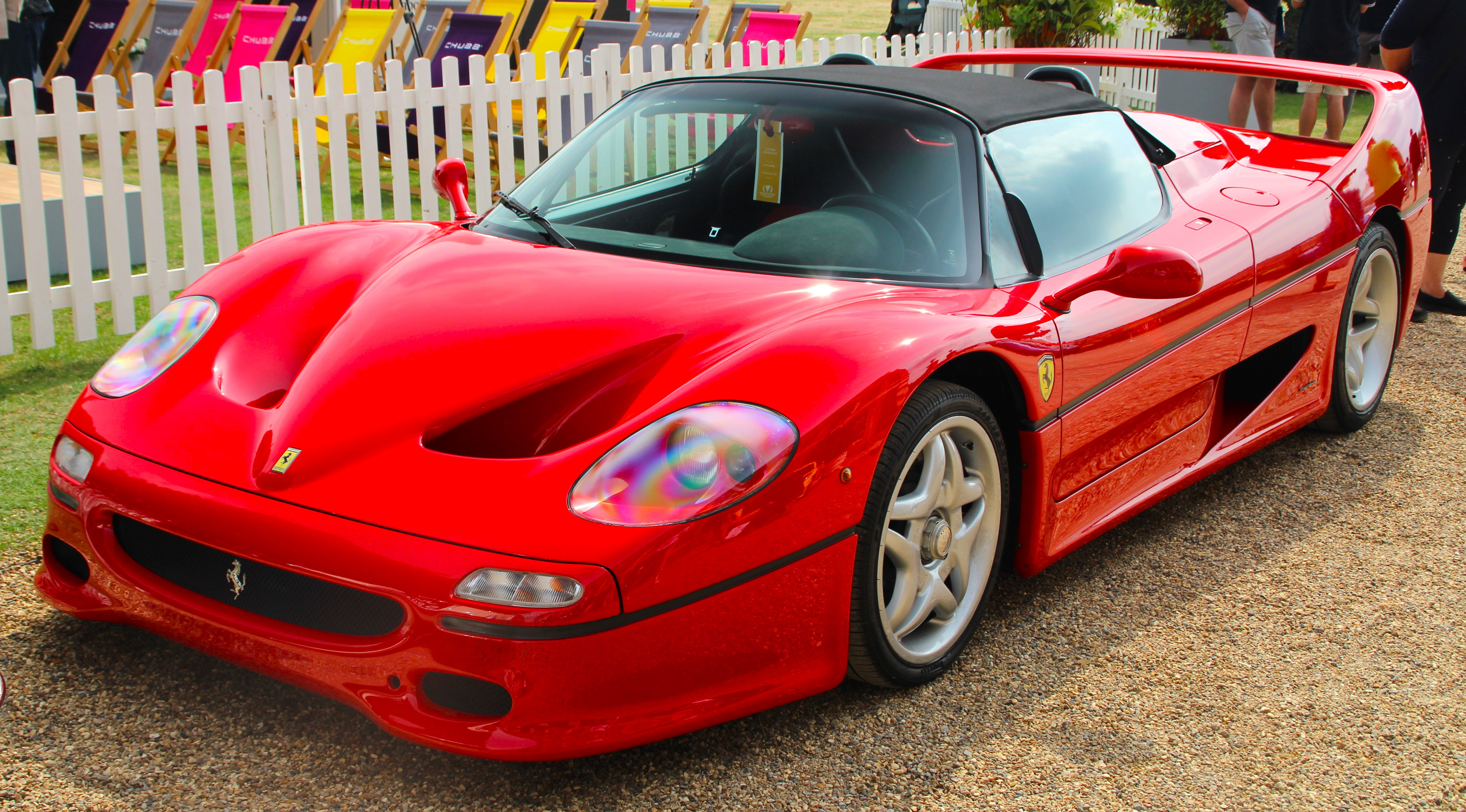
  Rosso Corsa
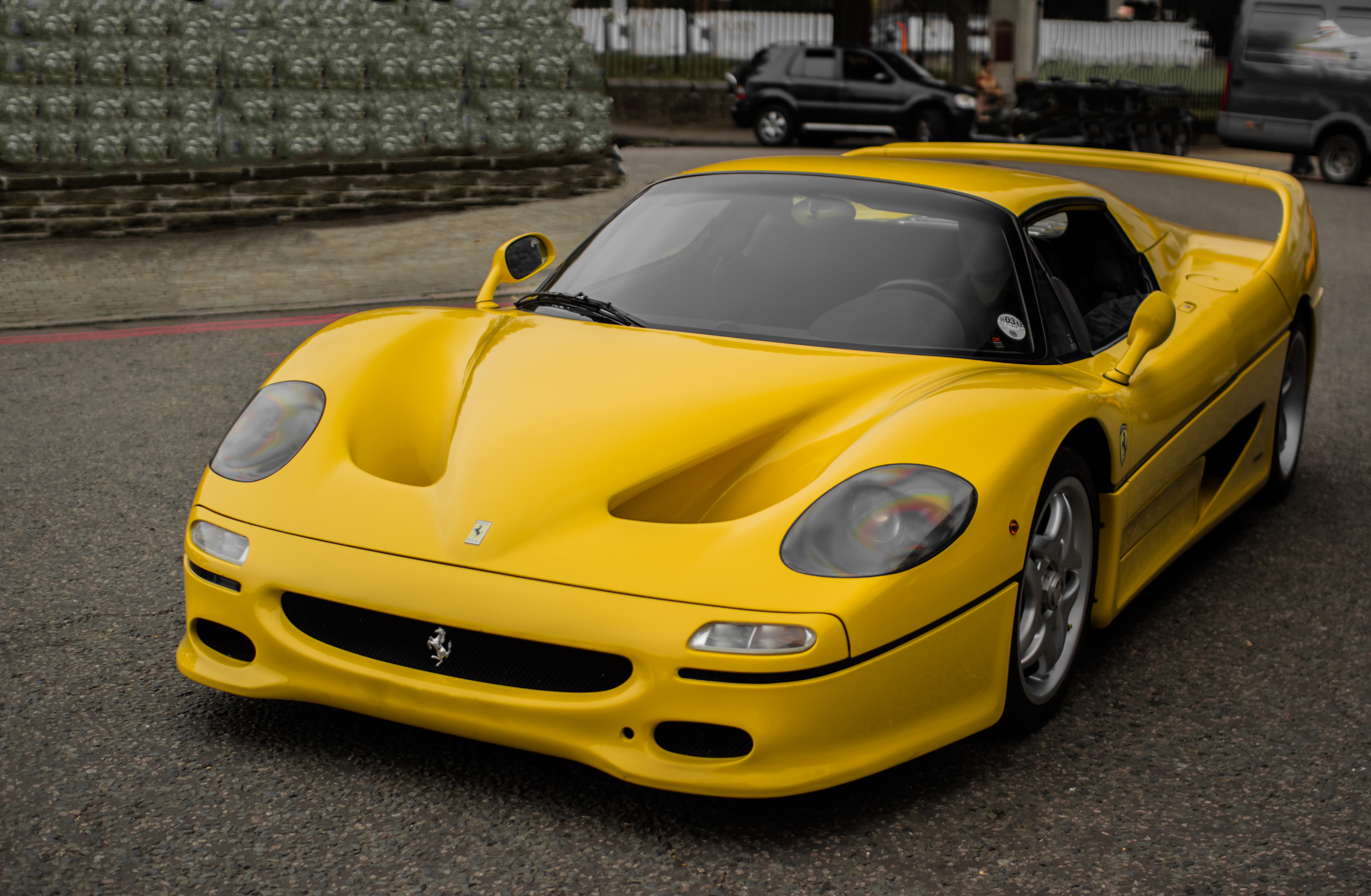
  Giallo Modena
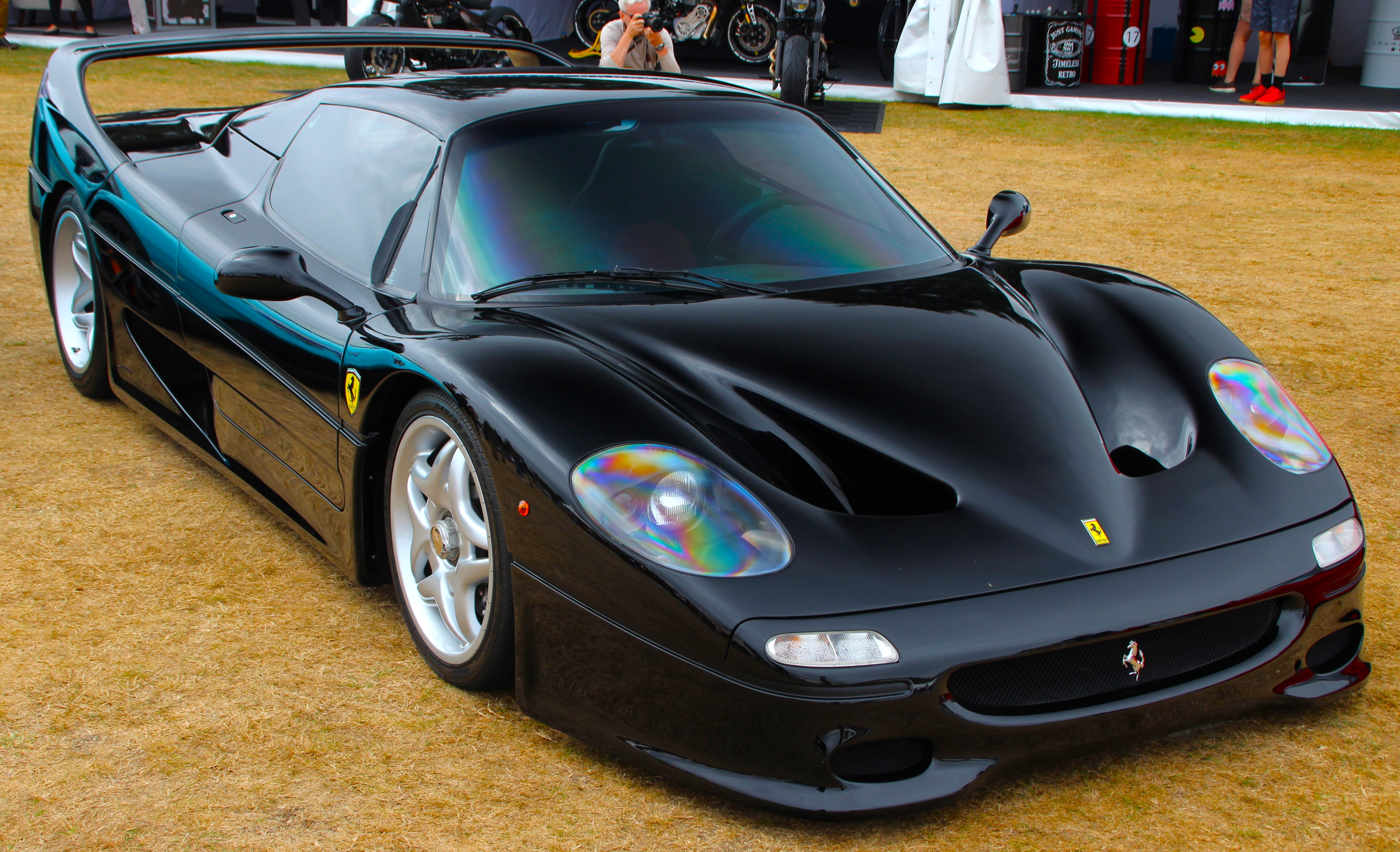
  Nero Daytona

== Performance ==
- 0–97 km/h (60 mph): 3.8 seconds
- 0–161 km/h (100 mph): 8.5 seconds
- 1/4 mile: 12.1 seconds at 198 km/h (123 mph)
- Skidpad: 0.95 g
- Braking 70–0 mph (113–0 km/h): 176 ft (54 m)
- Top speed: 325 km/h (202 mph) (claimed)

=== Track tests ===
The F50 has achieved the following track times:

- Tsukuba Circuit: 1:05.81
- Suzuka Circuit (2000): 2:25.525
- Sugo: 1:38.573
- Fiorano: 1:27.00

== Ferrari F50 GT ==
The Ferrari F50 GT (also known as the Ferrari F50 GT1) is a racing derivative of the F50, intended to compete in the BPR Global GT Series against other series rivals, such as the McLaren F1 GTR. After the series folded, Ferrari was unhappy with homologation specials such as the Porsche 911 GT1 being allowed in the newly formed FIA GT Championship and decided to cancel the project due to lack of funding to compete.

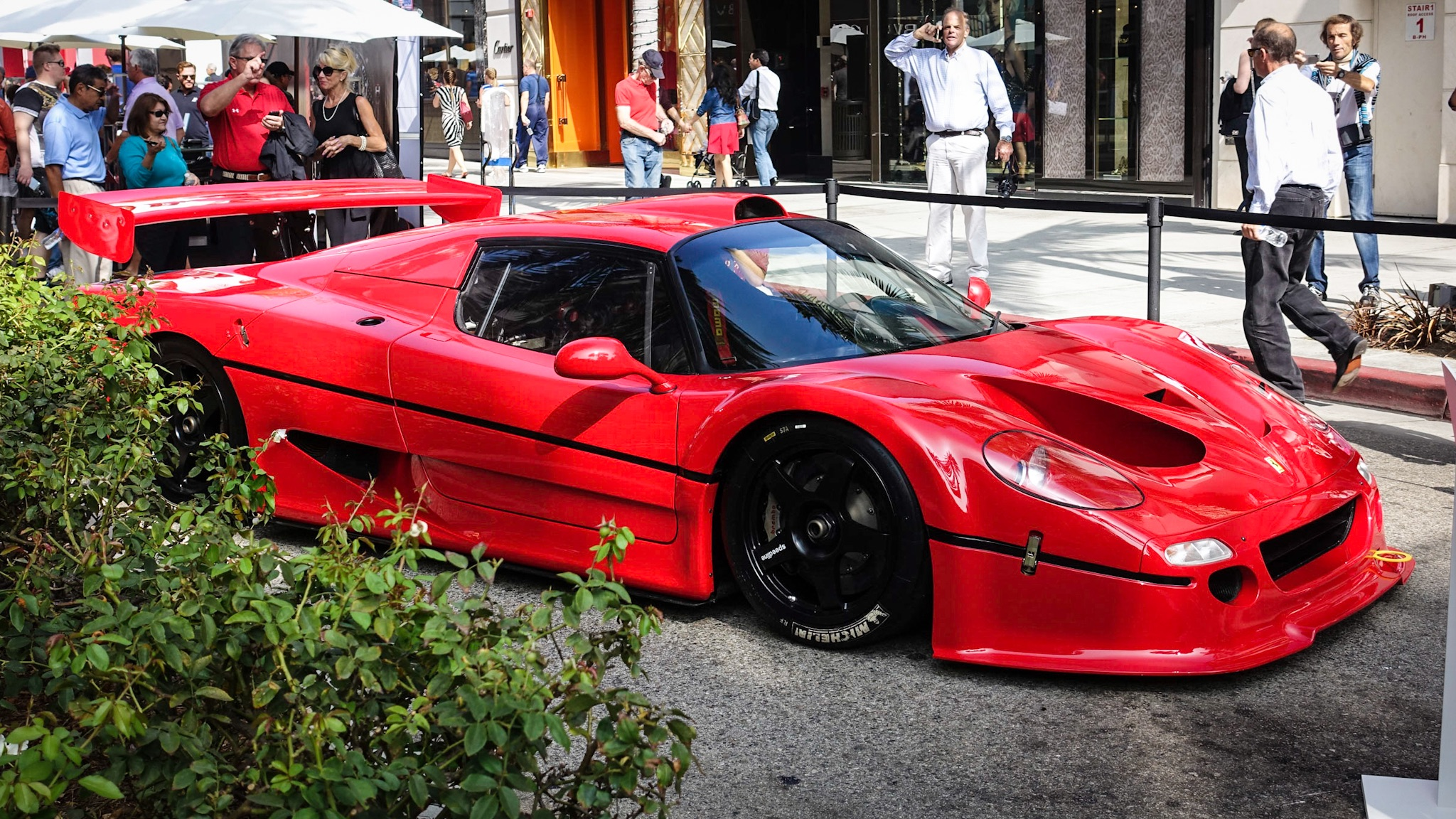
F50 GT (front view)

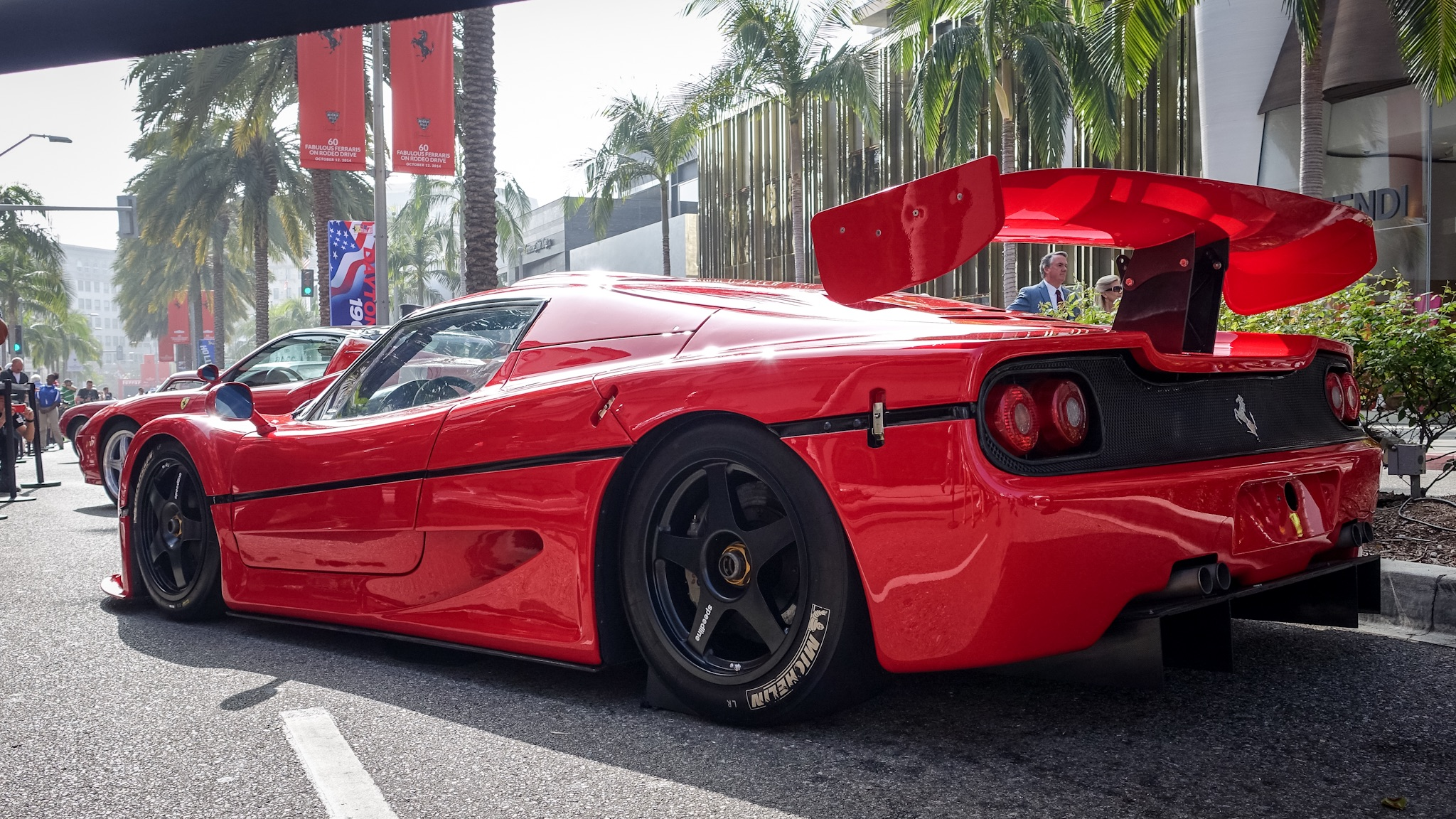
F50 GT (rear view)

The car was co-developed with Dallara and Michelotto.

Following the motorsport theme of the Ferrari F40 LM, Ferrari developed the F50 GT, a prototype based on the F50 that was built to compete in GT1-class racing. The car had a fixed roof, a large rear wing, new front spoiler and many other adjustments. The 4.7 litre V12 engine was tuned to generate around 750 brake horsepower (760 metric horsepower; 559 kilowatts) at 10,500 rpm and 380 lb⋅ft (520 N⋅m) of torque at 7,500 rpm. A test held in 1996 proved the car to be quicker even than the 333 SP, but this went unnoticed as Ferrari cancelled the F50 GT project because it was unhappy with FIA allowing homologation special cars such as the Porsche 911 GT1 in the series. Ferrari instead focused on Formula One after the BPR Global GT Series folded. The company sold off the three complete chassis out of the six planned chassis that were built–the test car 001, 002 and 003. Chassis 002 and 003 had bodies fitted before being sold. The remaining three tubs were reportedly destroyed.
