= Test Drive III: The Passion =

1990 racing video game

- MS-DOS cover art depicting the driver driving the Pininfarina Mythos
- Developer(s): Accolade
- Publisher(s): Accolade
- Producer(s): Sam Nelson
- Designer(s): Tom Loughry
- Artist(s): Justin R. Chin; Roseann Mitchell
- Composer(s): Russell Shiffer
- Series: Test Drive
- Platform(s): MS-DOS
- Release: NA: 1990
- Genre(s): Racing, simulation
- Mode(s): Single-player, multiplayer

Test Drive III: The Passion is a racing video game developed and published by Accolade in 1990 for MS-DOS. It is the third game in the Test Drive series. While the first two Test Drive titles were developed by Distinctive Software, the third one was developed in-house at Accolade. This resulted in many differences from the first two games.

== Gameplay ==
Unlike the first two titles, the third game has the concept of a free landscape; the player does not have to drive on a preset course. Each section contains alternate routes and shortcuts for reaching the finish line and the player can go wherever they want, i.e. drive off the road and onto the grass, hills, farms etc. The landscape includes features such as bridges, tunnels, water, hills and mountains. It also features railroad crossings with a real train running in a loop. The player must also obey the speed limit when a police car is in sight, otherwise they could be caught and fined.

The test course, situated in Northern California from Pacific Coast to Yosemite National Park, consists of five distinct sections (Scenic Coast, Coast Hills, Valley Farms, Foothills, and Sierra Vista) featuring varied landscapes. The game features three cars to drive; the Lamborghini Diablo, Ferrari Mythos Pininfarina Concept, and the Chevrolet Corvette CERV III Concept. Other features include changeable radio stations, windscreen wipers, headlights, and varying weather conditions and times of day.

Racing options include nine skill levels, head-to-head competition against two computer-controlled drivers, time trials against the clock, and racing against up to three other players, one at a time, on the same computer. Gameplay includes joystick and keyboard support as well as multiple viewpoints and replay options.

== Development and release ==
While the first two Test Drive titles were developed by Distinctive Software, the third one was developed in-house at Accolade. This resulted in many differences over the first two games. The game was radically different from the previous two installments by abandoning sprite graphics and using a combination of bitmapped and polygon-fill 3D graphics, and digitized car interiors instead. Unlike the previous games which were released on a variety of platforms, it was released exclusively for DOS.

An add-on package, Road & Car, was released in 1991 as an extra purchase, featuring a New England road course from Cape Cod to Niagara Falls, and the Acura NSX and Dodge Stealth R/T Turbo cars. New to the Test Drive III environment were covered bridges, low-flying airplanes, hot air balloons, horses and buses. It allows the player to combine vehicles and landscapes from both the original game and the add-on for variety.

== Reception ==
Computer Gaming World stated that Test Drive III: The Passion, while not spectacular, was a fine driving simulator and "a well-designed package". The magazine praised the Road & Car expansion's New England scenery and automobile reproductions, and stated that it provided "more of the same, with a slightly different angle" to the original game.
