= Fittipaldi EF7 =

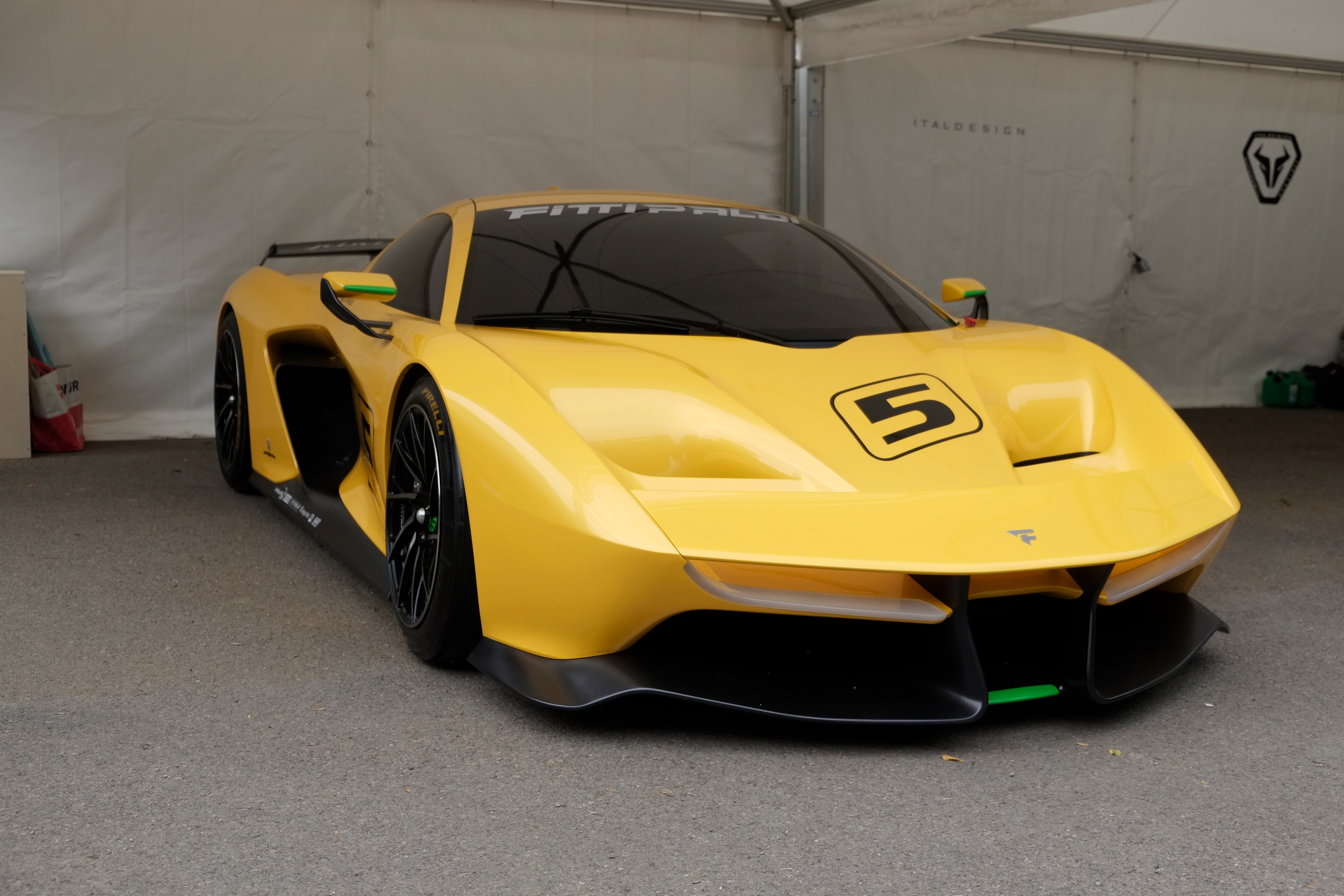

Overview
- Manufacturer: Fittipaldi Motors LLC; HWA AG
- Also called: Fittipaldi EF7 GTR; Fittipaldi EF7 Vision Gran Turismo by Pininfarina
- Production: 2018 (canceled)
- Designer: Pininfarina: Fabio Filippini; Paolo Pininfarina

Body and chassis
- Class: Sports car (S)
- Body style: 2-door coupe
- Layout: RMR layout

Powertrain
- Engine: 4.8 L Fittipaldi naturally-aspirated dry-sump lubricated V8
- Transmission: 6-speed Sequential

Dimensions
- Wheelbase: 2,700 mm (106.3 in)
- Length: 4,600 mm (181.1 in)
- Width: 1,980 mm (78.0 in)
- Height: 1,225 mm (48.2 in)
- Curb weight: 1,000 kg (2,205 lb)

The Fittipaldi EF7 was a Brazilian mid-engined sports car from Fittipaldi Motors, designed in collaboration with Pininfarina and HWA. Originally released as a Vision Gran Turismo concept car for the Gran Turismo Sport racing video game, former Formula One and IndyCar champion and company founder Emerson Fittipaldi announced that a production track-only version would be manufactured and released by spring 2018 as the EF7 GTR. However, the plan did not materialize, and the company became inactive in March 2019.

== History ==
The EF7 was the first Fittipaldi-badged car since the Fittipaldi F8 Formula One car in 1982, and was originally created to be part of the Vision Gran Turismo concept car programme. It was designed by Fabio Filippini and headed by Paolo Pininfarina. According to Emerson Fittipaldi, the design was created to loosely represent a shark and the process took six months. The car was also inspired by wind and how it travels the car. The production model would have featured differences from the concept model had it been produced.

Only 39 real-life units were planned to be made as track-only sports cars. The production number '39' originates from the 39 Formula One and IndyCar victories Fittipaldi achieved throughout his open-wheel motorsport career. Each customer was intended to receive personal racing coaching from Emerson Fittipaldi himself.

The purpose of the car was to have high power, low weight, and high downforce design; features that Emerson Fittipaldi wanted to have in a car. His most important goal for the EF7 was to allow his customers have the best driving enjoyment and experience.

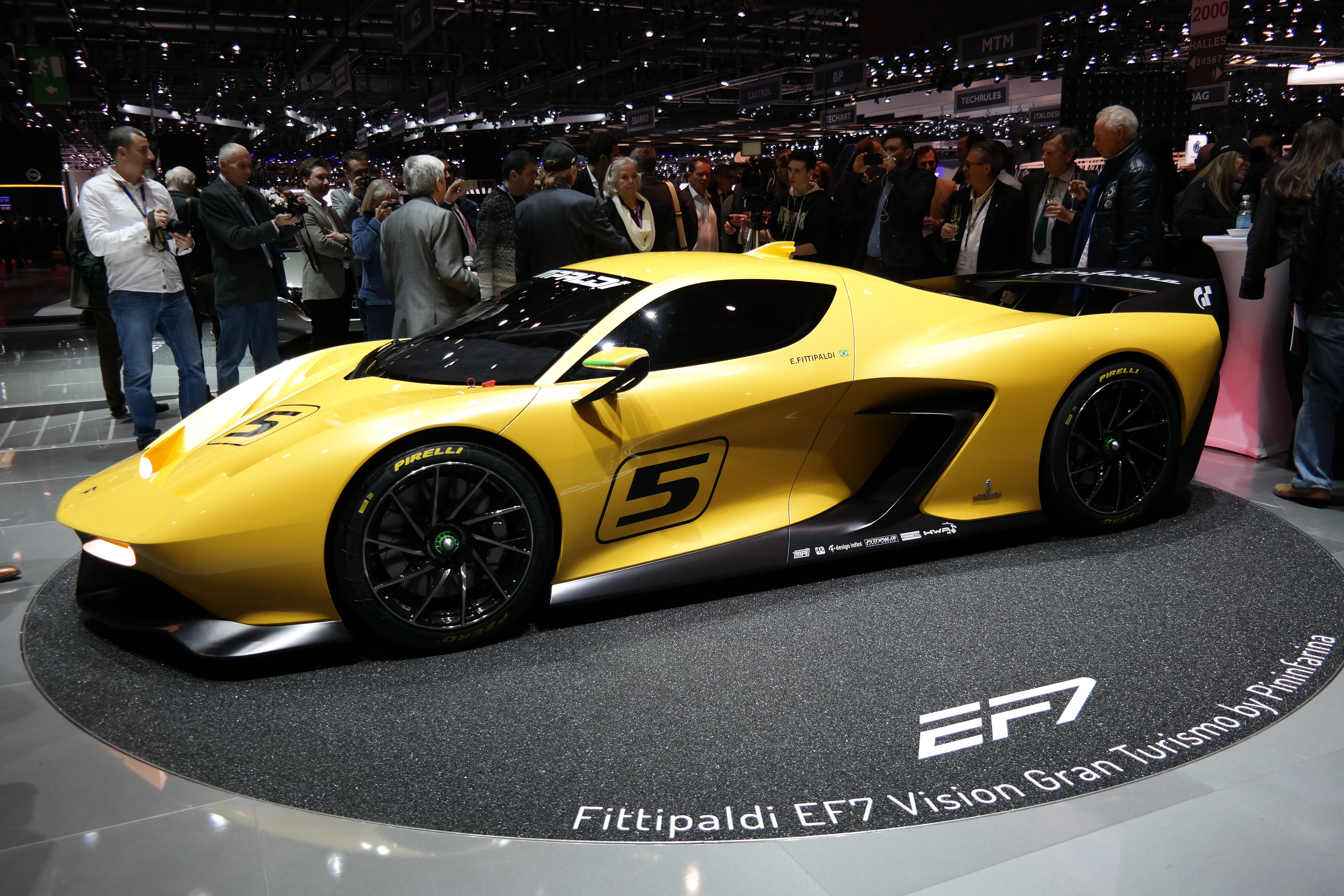
Side view of the Fittipaldi EF7.

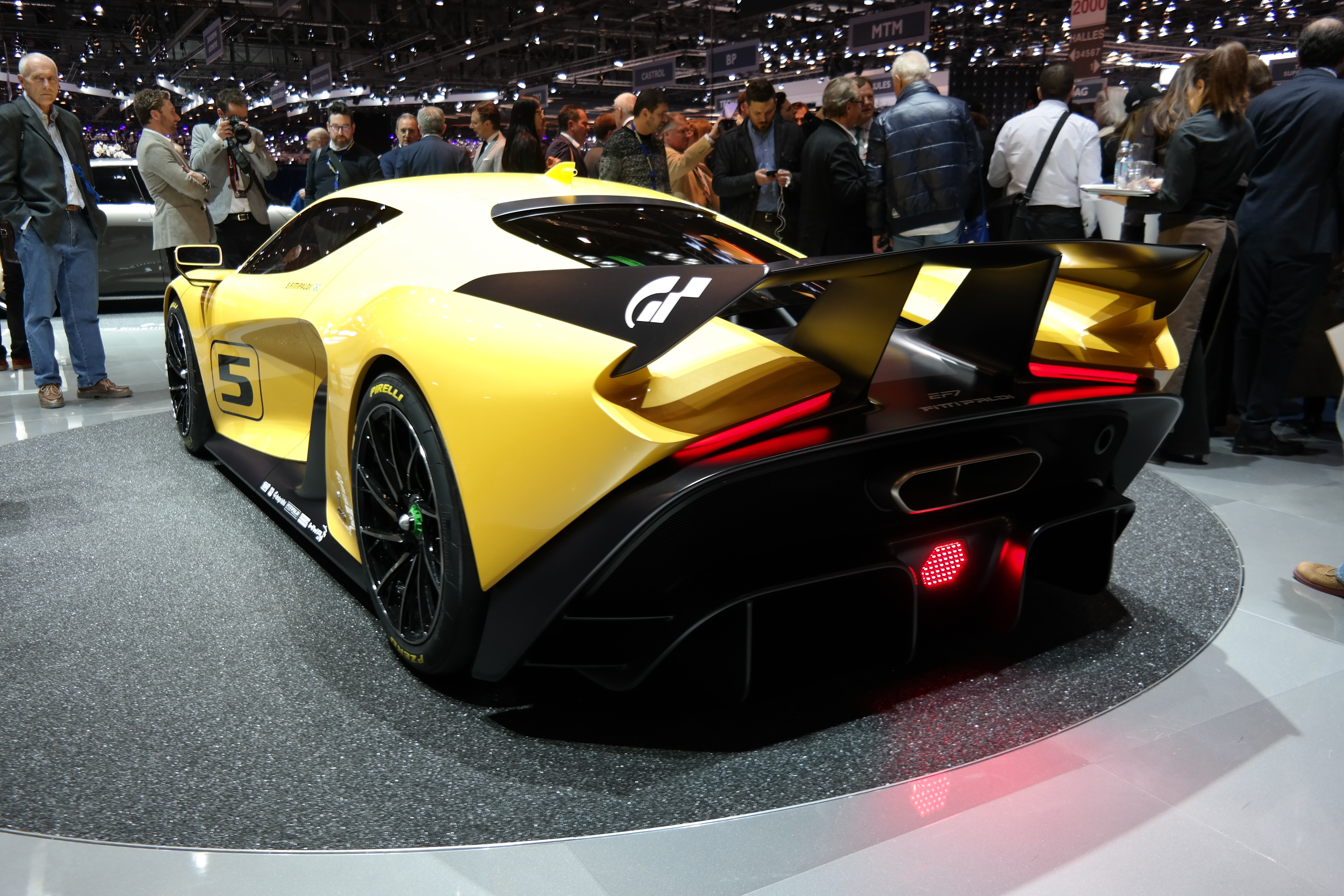
Rear view of the Fittipaldi EF7.

== Specifications ==
The EF7 contains a 4.8-liter naturally-aspirated V8 that is dry-sump lubricated. It is expected to have 600 hp (447 kW; 608 PS) or more. This is still to be decided on the final car. Emerson Fittipaldi says the torque, which is at 320 lb⋅ft (434 N⋅m), will help for faster launch, thanks to low-RPM for the torque. This should help for running under-3-second 0–60 mph (0–97 km/h) runs. The engine fumes come out of an eight-pipe exhaust that gathers into one exhaust. The engine will also have a 9000 rpm redline. All of this power will be sent by a 6-speed semi-automatic transmission.

The car's weight is said to stand at 1,000 kg (2,205 lb). The weight distribution is also said to be at 52 up front, and 48 down the rear. This was made possible thanks to a carbon-fiber construction for both the monocoque and body panels.

The car's suspension was planned to be constructed by HWA AG, who was planned to build part of the car.
