= Ferrari Mythos =

Concept car developed by Ferrari in 1989 based on the Ferrari Testarossa

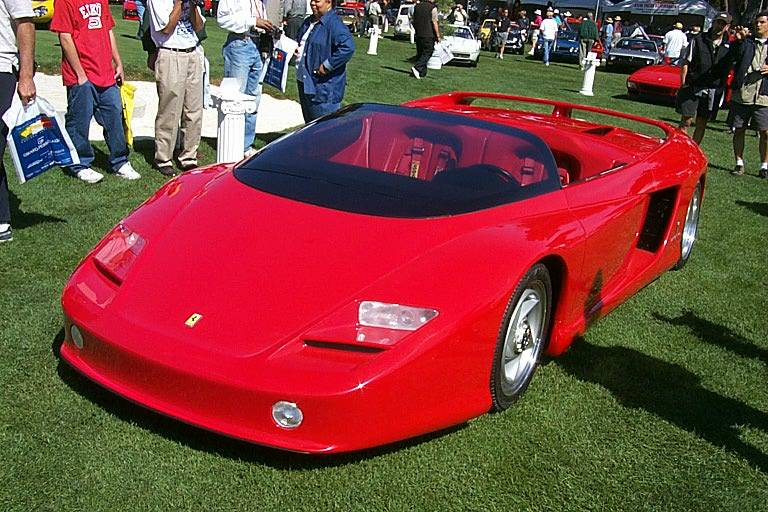

Overview
- Manufacturer: Ferrari S.p.A.
- Also called: Ferrari P7
- Production: 1989; 3 units (plus the prototype)
- Assembly: Cambiano, Italy
- Designer: Pietro Camardella, Lorenzo Ramaciotti at Pininfarina

Body and chassis
- Class: Concept car
- Body style: 2-door barchetta
- Layout: Rear mid-engine, rear-wheel-drive
- Related: Ferrari Testarossa; Ferrari F50

Powertrain
- Engine: 4.9 L Tipo F113 B Flat-12
- Transmission: 5-speed manual

Dimensions
- Wheelbase: 2,550.2 mm (100.4 in)
- Length: 4,335.8 mm (170.7 in)
- Width: 2,100.6 mm (82.7 in)
- Height: 1,064.3 mm (41.9 in)
- Curb weight: 2,756 lb (1,250 kg)

The Ferrari Mythos is a mid-engine, rear wheel drive concept car based on the mechanical underpinnings of the Ferrari Testarossa. Designed by Italian design house Pininfarina and developed by automobile manufacturer Ferrari, its world premiere was at the 1989 Tokyo Motor Show.

== Design ==
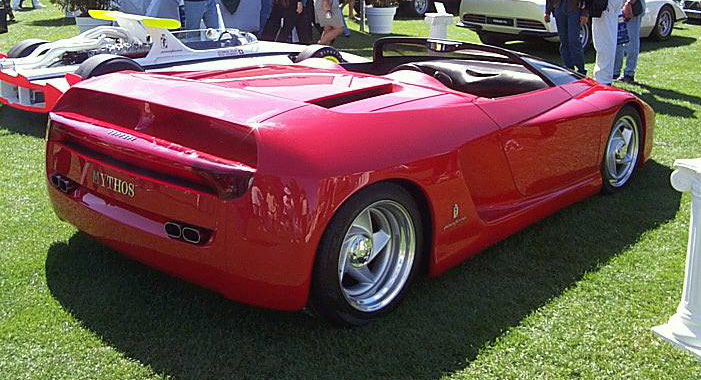
Rear 3/4 view

The design was implemented on the platform of the Ferrari Testarossa, which dictated the car's wedge shape and large air intake ahead of the rear wheels. The design of the Mythos later evolved into the Ferrari F40's successor, the F50.

The show car is stored at the Pininfarina style center at Cambiano (Italy).

== Performance ==
The Mythos is powered by a 4.9 L Tipo F113 B Ferrari flat-12 engine sourced from the Testarossa, the engine has a power output of 390 hp (291 kW; 395 PS) at 6,300 rpm and 354 N⋅m (261 lb⋅ft) of torque at 4,500 rpm while having a power-to-weight ratio of 308 hp per tonne. Power is sent to the rear wheels through a Testarossa sourced 5-speed manual transmission. The car utilises a helical coil suspension system with transverse arms on the front and rear. Acceleration figures of the car remain unknown but the car has a projected top speed of around 290 km/h (180 mph).

== Production ==
Although not intended to be sold to the public, the brother of the current Sultan of Brunei, Prince Jefri Bolkiah, is known to have commissioned three Mythos, with one being red, blue for Prince Hakeem and the other being black, with the black example not being verified until late 2024.

== Gallery ==
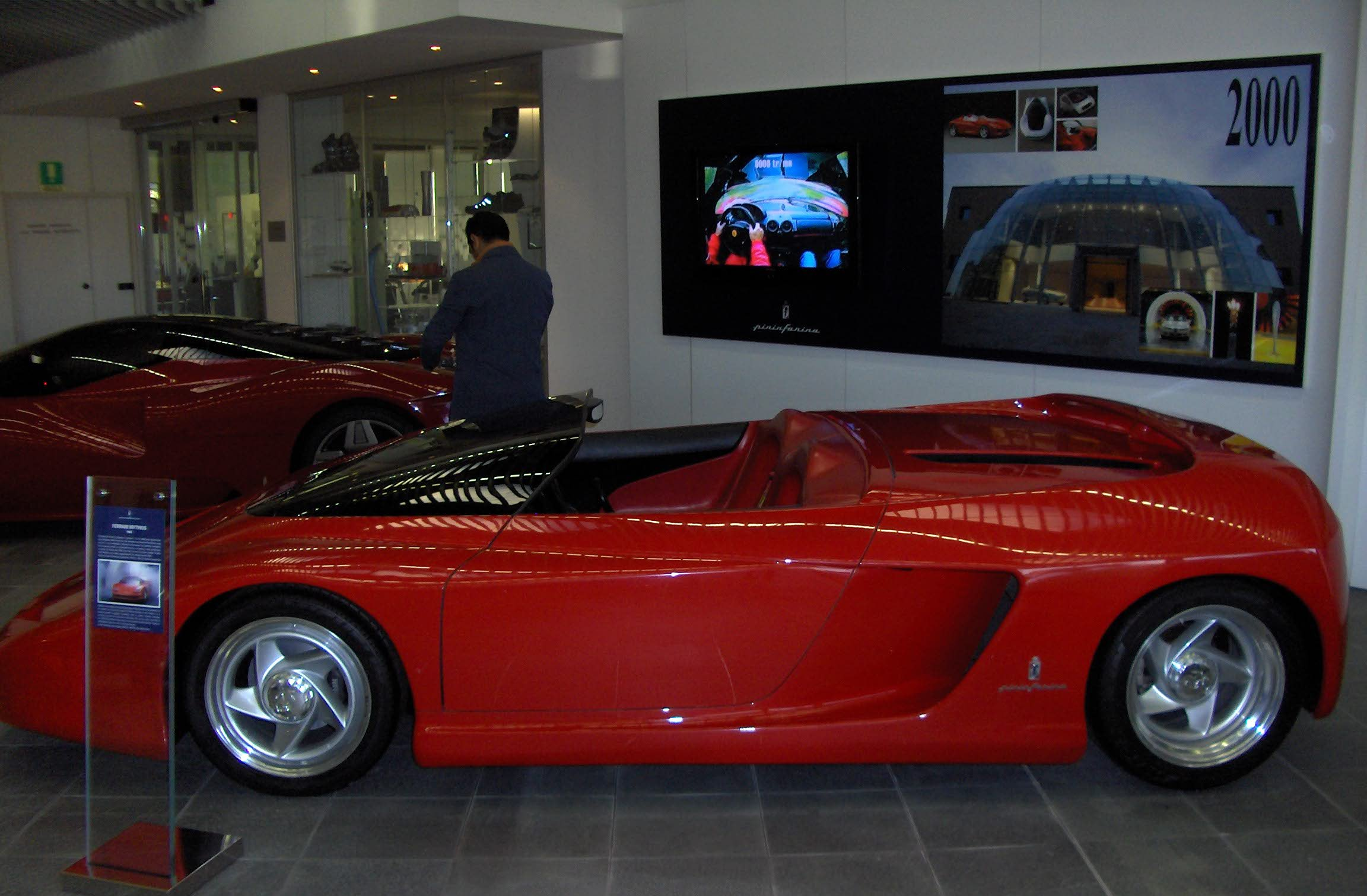
Side view

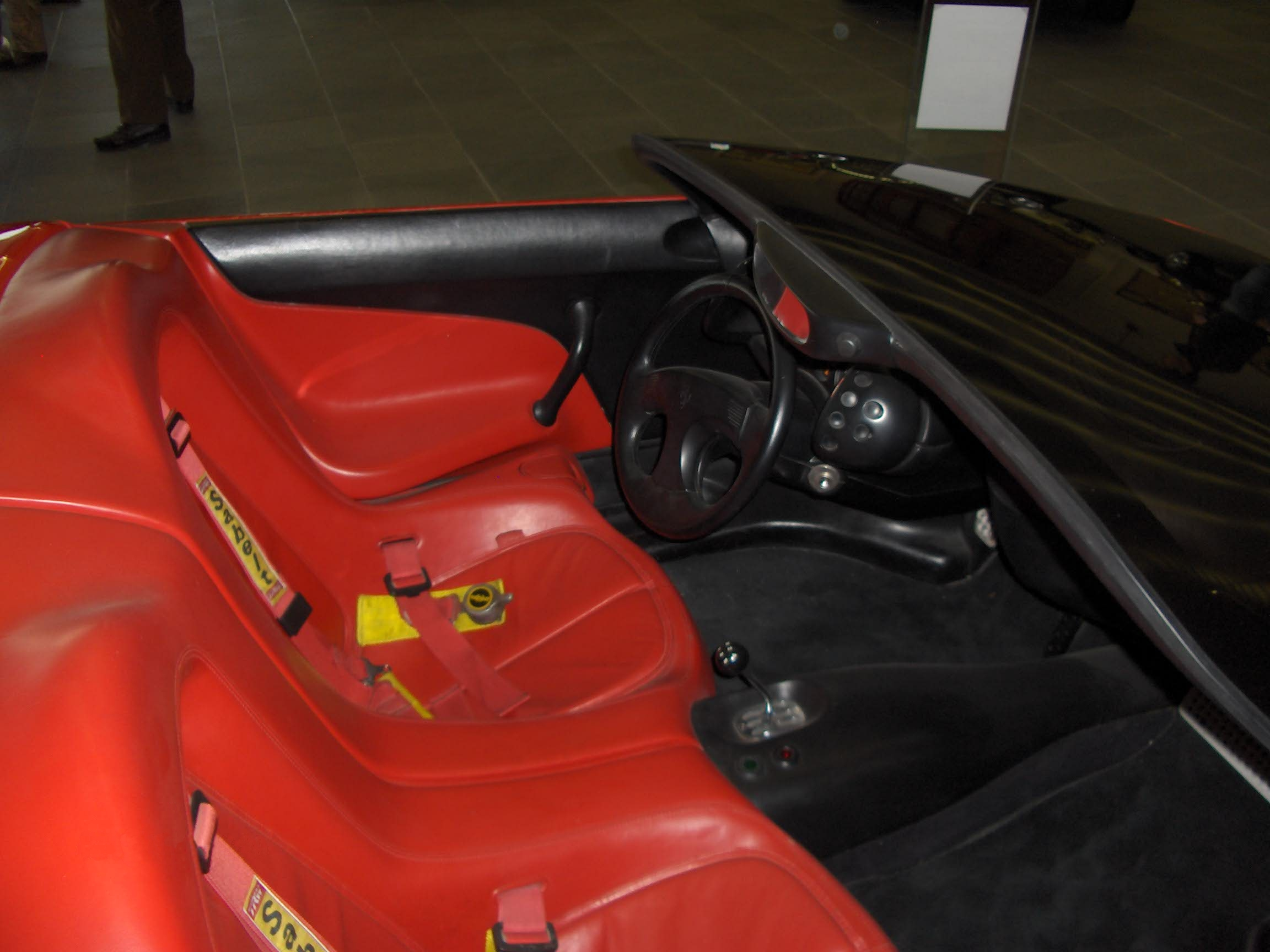
Interior

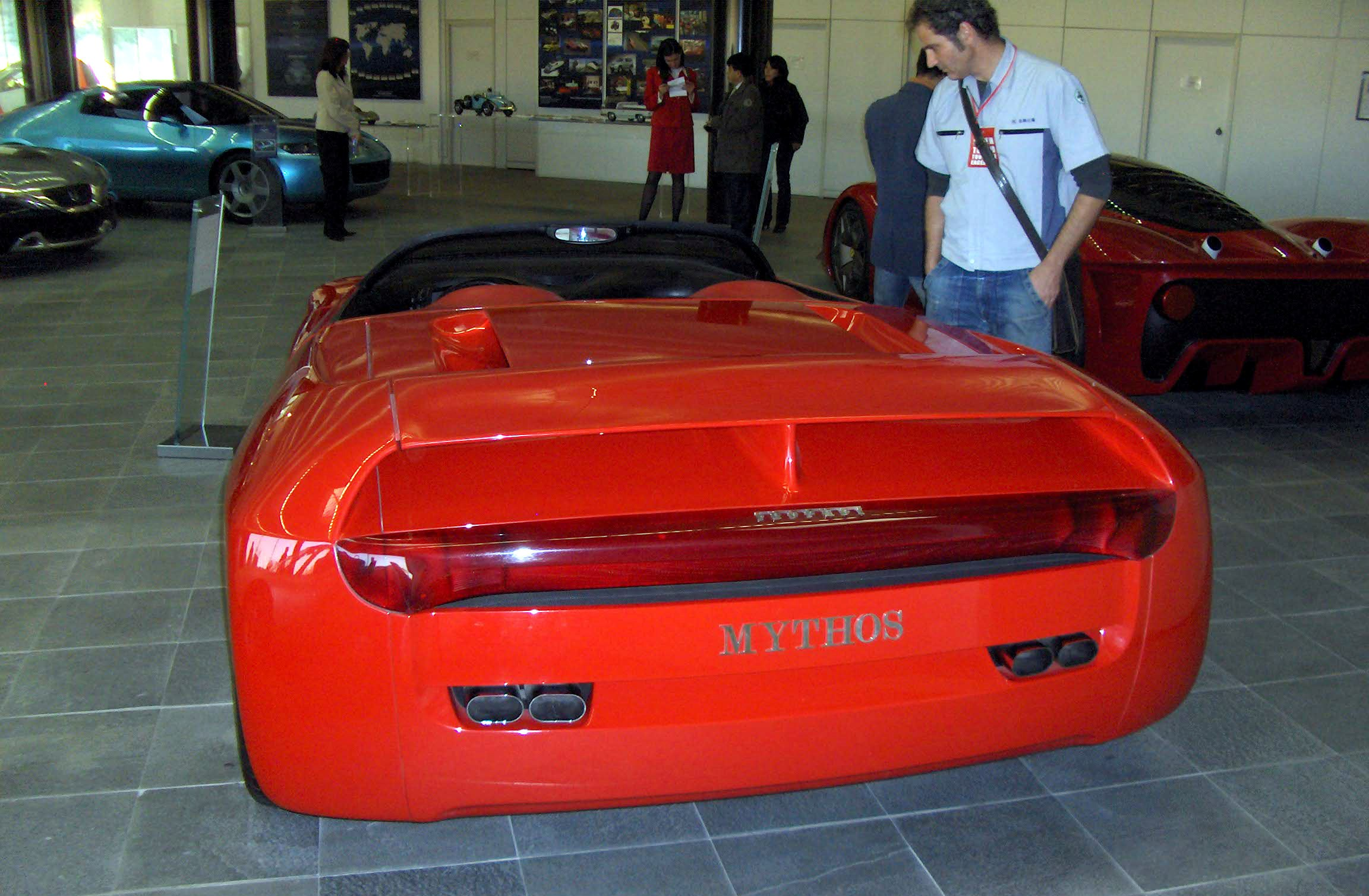
Rear view

== Other media ==
The Mythos was prominently featured in the 1990 racing video game Test Drive III.
