= Fiat Dino =

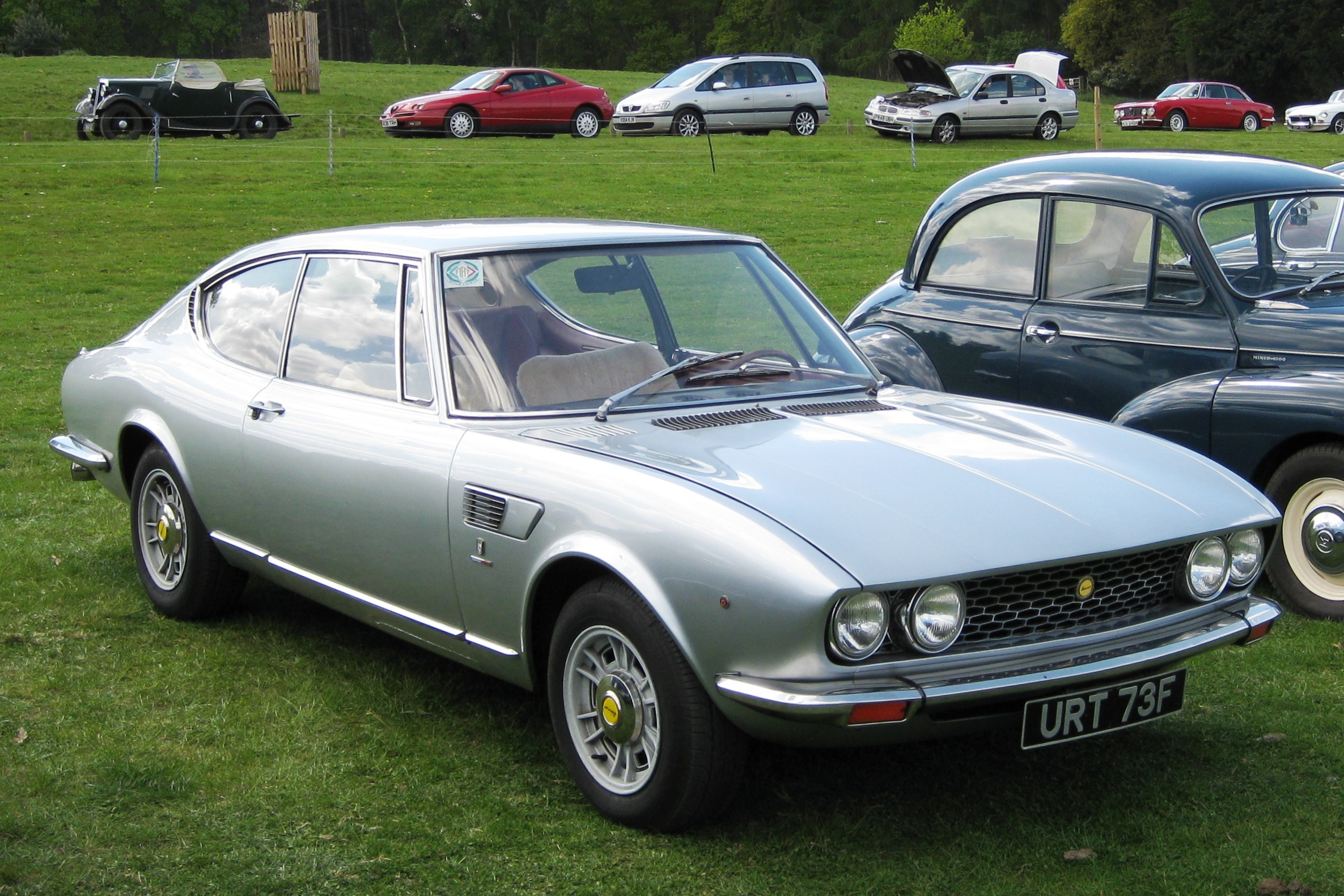
- Fiat Dino Coupé

Overview
- Manufacturer: Fiat
- Production: 1966–1973
- Assembly: Italy: Rivalta, Turin (1966–1969); Italy: Maranello, Modena (1969–1973)
- Designer: Spider: Filippo Sapino at Pininfarina; Coupé: Giorgetto Giugiaro at Bertone (initial design, 1963); Marcello Gandini at Bertone (final design)

Body and chassis
- Class: Sports car (S)
- Body style: 2-door coupé 2-door spider
- Layout: Front-engine, rear-wheel-drive
- Related: Dino 206 GT and 246 GT

Powertrain
- Engine: 2.0 L Dino V6 (1966–69); 2.4 L Dino V6 (1969–73)
- Transmission: 5-speed manual

Dimensions
- Wheelbase: Coupé: 2,550 mm (100.4 in); Spider: 2,280 mm (89.8 in)
- Length: Coupé: 4,507 mm (177.4 in); Spider: 4,109–4,237 mm (161.8–166.8 in)
- Width: Coupé: 1,696 mm (66.8 in); Spider: 1,709 mm (67.3 in)
- Height: Coupé: 1,287–1,315 mm (50.7–51.8 in); Spider: 1,245–1,270 mm (49.0–50.0 in)
- Kerb weight: Coupé: 1,270–1,380 kg (2,800–3,042 lb); Spider: 1,150–1,240 kg (2,535–2,734 lb)

The Fiat Dino (Type 135) is a front-engine, rear-wheel-drive sports car produced by Fiat from 1966 to 1973. The Dino name refers to the Ferrari Dino V6 engine, produced by Fiat and installed in the cars to achieve the production numbers sufficient for Ferrari to homologate the engine for Formula 2 racing.

== History ==
=== Background ===
The Dino road cars came to be because of Enzo Ferrari's need to homologate a V6 engine for Formula 2 racing cars. In 1965, the Commission Sportive Internationale de la FIA drew up new rules, to be enacted for the 1967 season. Formula 2 engines were required to have no more than six cylinders, and to be derived from a production engine, from a road car homologated in the GT class, with at least 500 examples manufactured within 12 months. Since a small manufacturer, like Ferrari was in the mid 60s, did not possess the production capacity to reach such quotas, an agreement was signed with Fiat and made public on 1 March 1965: Fiat would produce the 500 engines needed for the homologation, to be installed in a GT car which remained to be specified.

Dino was the nickname of Enzo's son Alfredo Ferrari, who had died in 1956 and was credited with the original concept for Ferrari's Formula 2 V6 racing engine, believed to be designed by Vittorio Jano with a peculiar 65° angle between the cylinder banks. In his memory, V6-engined Ferrari sports prototype racing cars had been named Dino since the late 1950s. The conversion of this racing engine for road use and series production was entrusted to the renowned engineer Aurelio Lampredi, who had previously designed several 4-cylinder Ferrari engines. Interviewed in the early 1980s, Lampredi noted that "things didn't work out exactly as Ferrari had foreseen": Enzo Ferrari had counted on building the engines at Maranello, but Fiat's management insisted on taking control of production, to avoid any breaks in the engine supply. The resulting Fiat-built V6 ended up being installed in two very different vehicles: the Fiat Dino, a front-engined grand tourer assembled in Turin by Fiat, and in Ferrari's first series-produced mid-engined sports car, built in Maranello and sold under the newly created Dino marque. Even on the cylinder block casting, the name FIAT was visible, which was not in line with the Enzo's aspirations for the newly created DINO marque.

=== Fiat Dino (1966–1969) ===
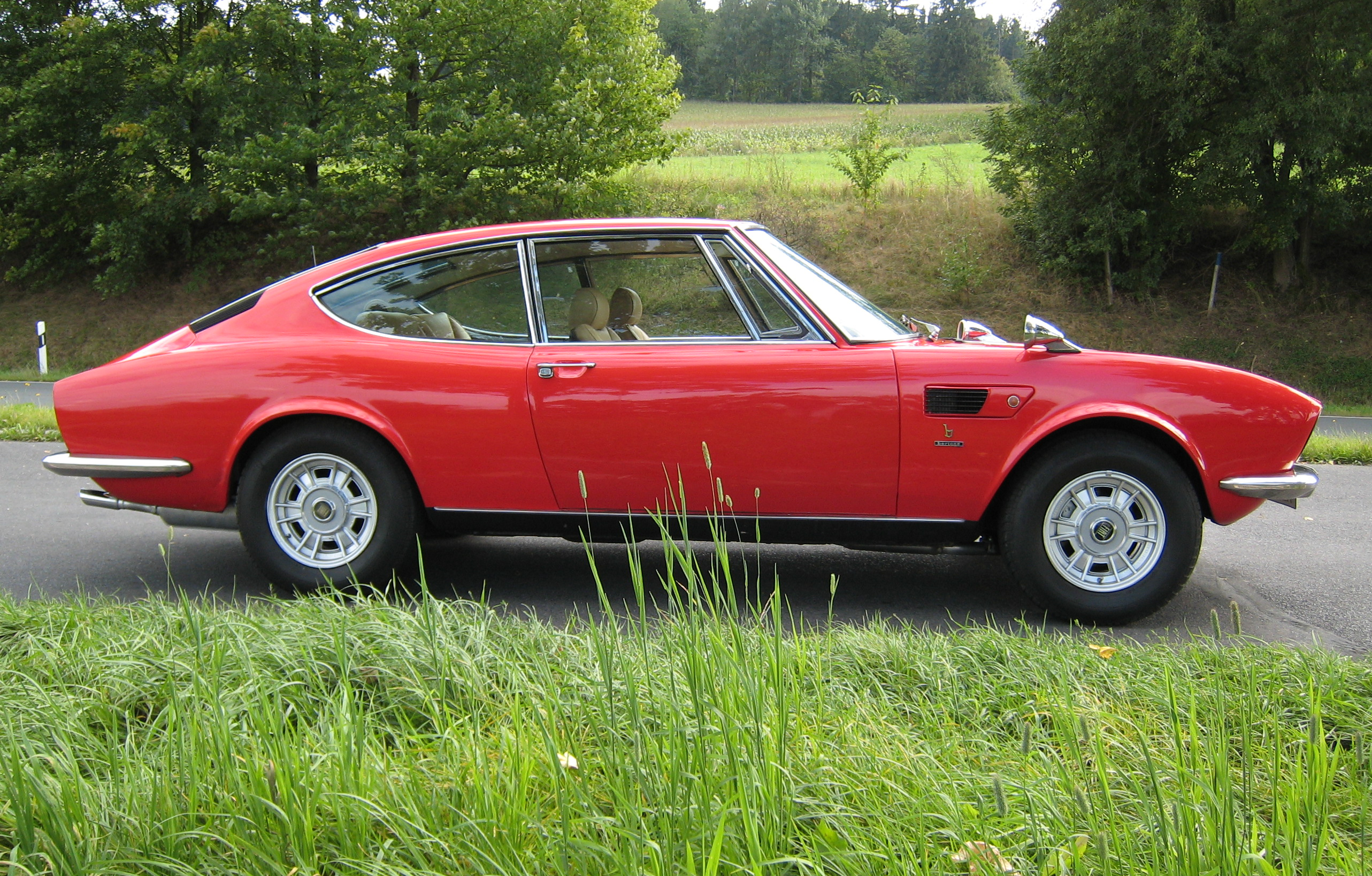
Side view of a 1971 Dino coupé 2400

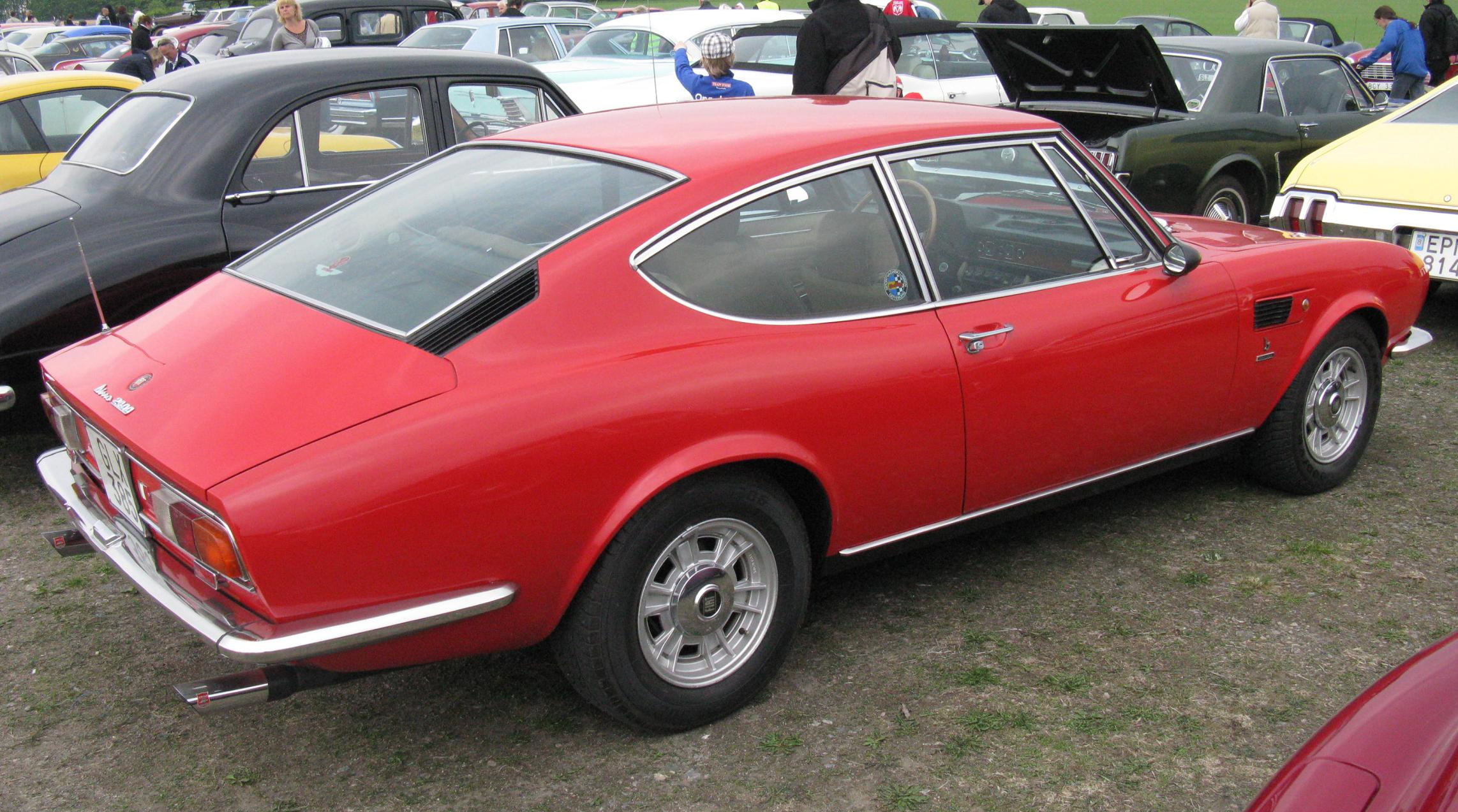
Rear 3/4 view of a Dino coupé

The Fiat Dino was introduced as a 2-seater Spider at the Turin Motor Show in October 1966; a 2+2 Coupé version, built on a 270 mm (10.6 in) longer wheelbase, was unveiled a few months later at the Geneva Motor Show in March 1967. The two bodies showed very different lines, as they had been designed and were manufactured for Fiat by two different coachbuilders: the Spider by Pininfarina, and the Coupé by Bertone — where it had been sketched out by Giorgetto Giugiaro in 1963 and finished by his replacement, Marcello Gandini, after Giugiaro's departure to Ghia. Curiously, the Spider type approval identified it as a 2+1 seater. The Spider had poorer interior trim than the Coupé, below par for its class: the dashboard was covered in vinyl, the metal-spoke steering wheel had a plastic rim, and the interior switchgear was derived from cheaper Fiat models. After a few months this issue was addressed, and Spiders produced after February 1967 had a wood-rimmed steering wheel as well as a wood trim on the dashboard like the sister Coupé car had since the beginning. Option lists for both models were limited to radio, metallic paint, leather upholstery, and for the Spider a vinyl-covered hardtop with roll-bar style stainless steel trim.

The car was offered with an all-aluminium DOHC 2.0 L V6, coupled to a 5-speed manual transmission. The same 2.0-litre engine was used in mid-engined, Ferrari-built Dino 206 GT, which was introduced in pre-production form at the 1967 Turin Motor Show and went on sale in 1968. Fiat quoted 160 PS (118 kW; 158 hp) for the Fiat Dino, while in 1967 Ferrari—presenting the first prototype of the Dino 206 GT—claimed 180 hp (130 kW) despite both engines being made by Fiat workers in Turin on the same production line, without any discrimination as to their destination. Jean-Pierre Gabriel in "Les Ferraris de Turin" notes that, "La declaration de Ferrari ne reposait sur aucun fondament technique"—Ferrari's statement had no technical basis.

=== Fiat Dino 2400 (1969–1973) ===
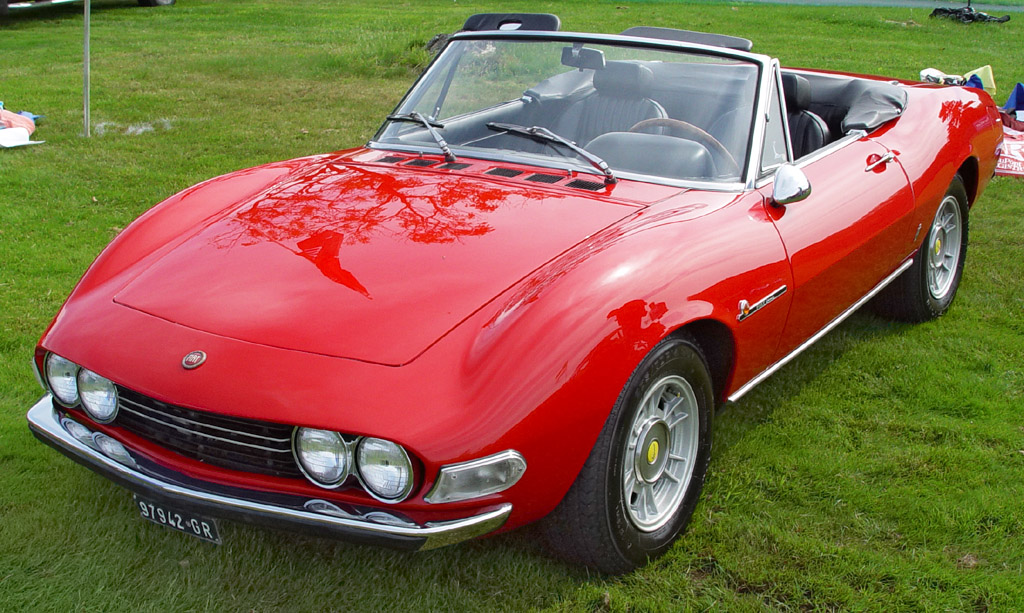
1970 Fiat Dino 2400 Spider

In 1969, both Ferrari and Fiat introduced new 2.4-litre Dino models. The Fiat Dino 2400 premiered in October 1969 at the Turin Motor Show; besides the larger engine, another notable improvements was independent rear suspension. The V6 now put out 180 PS (132 kW; 178 hp), and used a cast iron instead of the previous light alloy engine block; the same engine was installed on the Dino 246 GT, Ferrari's evolution of the 206. Whereas the original Dino was equipped with a rigid axle suspended by leaf springs and 4 shock absorbers, 2.4-litre cars used a coil-sprung independent rear suspension with 2 shock absorbers derived from the Fiat 130. Rather than engine power and absolute speed, the most important consequence of the larger displacement was a marked increase in torque, available at lower engine speeds; the Dino 2400 had much better pickup, and it was found more usable, even in city traffic. Other modifications went on to improve the car's drivability and safety: larger diameter clutch, new dogleg ZF gearbox with revised gear ratios, wider section Pirelli Cinturato tyres, and upsized brake discs and callipers.

Cosmetic changes were comparatively minor. Both models were now badged "Dino 2400". On the Coupé the previous silver honeycomb grille with the round Fiat logo on its centre had been replaced by a new black grille and a bonnet badge. A host of details were changed from chrome to matte black, namely part of the wheels, the vents on the front wings and the cabin ventilation outlets—the latter moved from next to the side windows to the rear window. At the rear there were different tail lights. The spider also sported a new grille with two horizontal chrome bars, five-bolt instead of knock-off wheels, as well as a new bumpers with rubber strips. Inside only the Coupé received an entirely redesigned dashboard and new cloth seats, with optional leather seat upholstery; front seat headrests were standard on the Coupé and optional on the spider.

=== Production ===
Spider and Coupé bodies were produced respectively by Pininfarina and Bertone. 2.0-litre and early 2.4-litre cars were assembled by Fiat in Rivalta di Torino. Starting from December 1969, the Fiat Dino was assembled in Maranello on Ferrari's production line, alongside the 246 GT. Between 1966 and 1969, there were 3,670 2.0-litre Coupés and 1,163 2.0-litre Spiders made; with only 420 built, the 2400 Spider is the rarest of the Fiat's Dinos. Of the total 7,803 Fiat Dino produced, 74% were the popular Coupé and only 26% were spiders.

== Specifications ==
The Fiat Dino Coupé used an all-steel unibody construction. The Spider had an aluminum trunk lid. The dual-circuit braking system with vacuum servo operated on four wheel disc brakes. The upgraded Girling brakes of the Dino 2400 were shared with sports cars like the De Tomaso Pantera and Lamborghini Miura. Steering was of the worm and roller type by French manufacturer Gemmer.

=== Suspension ===
Front suspension was of the double wishbone type. The upper wishbone consisted of a stamped steel control arm, the lower one of a stamped steel link and an adjustable forward radius rod. Coaxial coil springs and hydraulic dampers were attached to the upper wishbone; an anti-roll bar was fitted.

On 2.0-litre cars, the rear suspension consisted of a rigid axle on semi-elliptic springs (single-leaf on the spider, two-leaf on the Coupé) and twin hydraulic dampers on each side. It was located by a longitudinal reaction strut on each side, linked to the axle at the front and to the aft leaf spring attachment point at the rear.

On 2.4-litre cars, the independent rear suspension consisted on each side of a long oblique stamped steel link (incorporating the spring seat) and a transverse link, attached to the same crossmember which supported the differential; there were coil springs, single hydraulic dampers and an anti-roll bar.

=== Engines ===
A peculiarity of Dino V6 engines was a 65° angle between the cylinder banks, instead of the usual 60°. The valvetrain consisted of 12 poppet valves timed by two chain-driven overhead camshafts. Compression ratio was 9:1 on both engines. Fuel was delivered via three twin-choke downdraught Weber Carburetors, normally 40 DCN 14 on 2.0 cars and 40 DCNF 12 on 2.4 cars.

The 2.0-litre V6 had bore and stroke respectively of 86 mm (3.4 in) and 57 mm (2.2 in), for a total displacement of 1,986.6 cc. The engine block was alloy, with inserted special cast iron wet cylinder liners; cylinder heads were aluminium as well, with cast iron valve seats and hemispherical combustion chambers. In 1968, the 2.0-litre Fiat Dino became the first car to have electronic ignition as standard. The Dinoplex C electronic capacitive discharge ignition was developed by Magneti Marelli expressly for the high-revving Dino V6 engine. Performance was impressive, with a 0–60 mph time of less than 8 seconds. Early Dino's were later on equipped with the Dinoplex C ignition. Its primary function was to prevent fouling of the sparkplugs in town use.

The 2.4-litre V6 had bore and stroke respectively of 92.5 mm (3.6 in) and 60 mm (2.4 in), for a total displacement of 2,418 cc. The redesigned engine block was cast iron.

| Model | Type | Configuration | Displacement | Power | Torque | Top speed |
|---|---|---|---|---|---|---|
| Dino | 135 B.000 | DOHC 12v 65° V6 aluminium block | 1,986.6 cc (121.2 cu in) | 160 PS DIN (118 kW; 158 hp) at 7,200 rpm | 163 N⋅m (120 lb⋅ft) at 6,000 rpm | Coupé: 200 km/h (124 mph) |
| Dino | 135 B.000 | DOHC 12v 65° V6 aluminium block | 1,986.6 cc (121.2 cu in) | 160 PS DIN (118 kW; 158 hp) at 7,200 rpm | 163 N⋅m (120 lb⋅ft) at 6,000 rpm | Spider: 210 km/h (130 mph) |
| Dino 2400 | 135 G.000 | DOHC 12v 65° V6 cast iron block | 2,418 cc (147.6 cu in) | 180 PS DIN (132 kW; 178 hp) at 6,600 rpm | 216 N⋅m (159 lb⋅ft) at 4,600 rpm | Coupé: 205 km/h (127 mph) |
| Dino 2400 | 135 G.000 | DOHC 12v 65° V6 cast iron block | 2,418 cc (147.6 cu in) | 180 PS DIN (132 kW; 178 hp) at 6,600 rpm | 216 N⋅m (159 lb⋅ft) at 4,600 rpm | Spider: 210 km/h (130 mph) |

=== Transmission ===
Both series cars used an all-synchromesh 5-speed manual transmission, with an hydraulic single-plate dry clutch (up-sized on the 2400), and a limited-slip differential. Two-litre Dinos used a transmission of Fiat's own design. This was changed on the 2400 to a ZF-sourced S5-18/3 dog-leg gearbox, the same found on the Fiat 130 as well as on other manufacturers' cars.

== Motorsport ==
The Fiat Dino was never raced officially, and only seldom by privateer drivers. The one notable participation was at the 1968 24 Hours of Le Mans, where a two-litre Spider was entered by the French Fiat-Abarth importer in the sports prototype class. Driven by Marcel Martin, Jean-André Mesange and Hubert Roche, it finished the race 18th overall.

== Concept cars ==
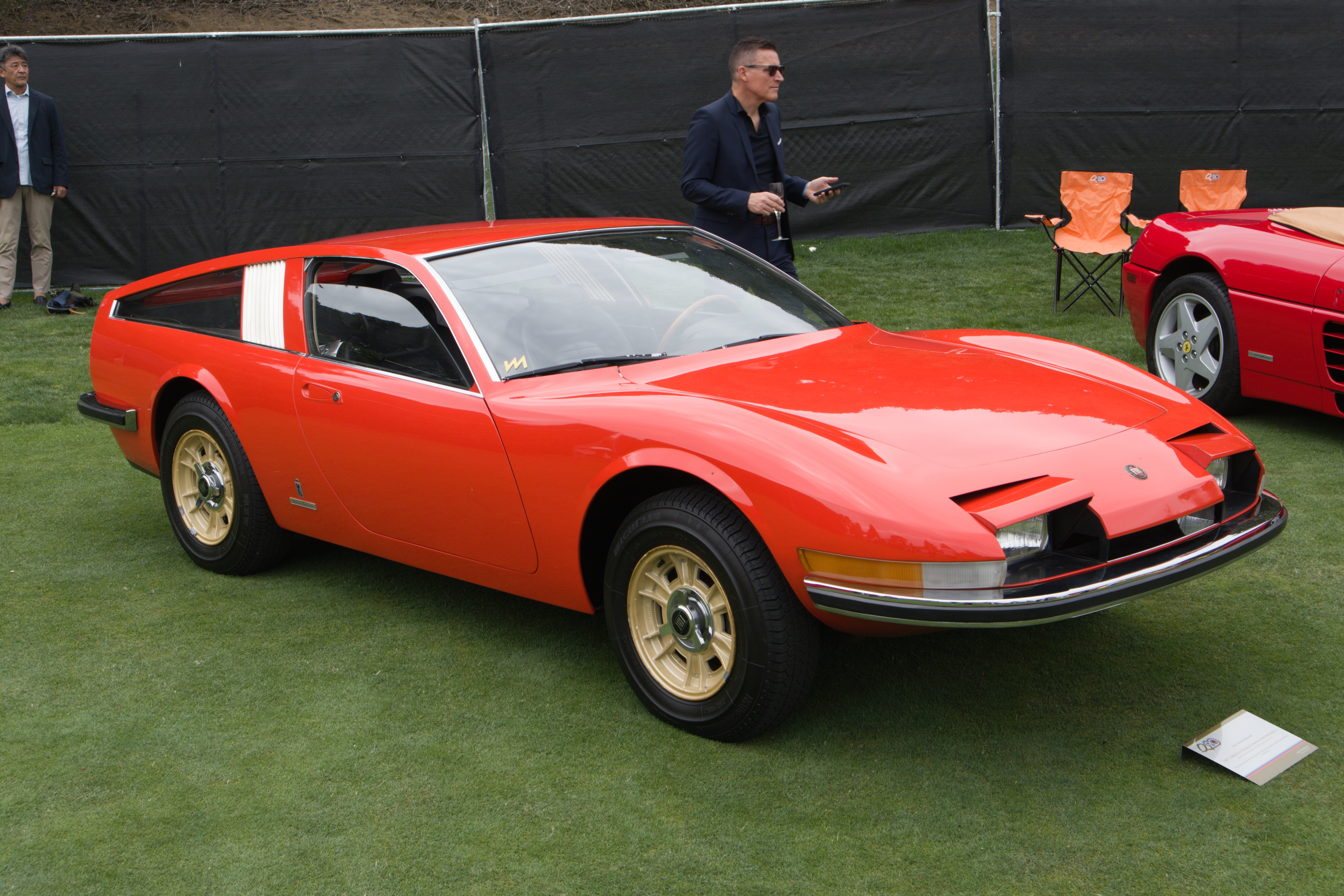
1968 Fiat Dino Ginevra

The 1967 Fiat Dino Parigi was presented at the 1967 Paris Motor Show and named after this venue, applying the Kammback designs and a shooting brake body style. A year later, at the 1968 Geneva Motor Show Pininfarina showcased the Fiat Dino Ginevra, a specially bodied berlinetta based on Dino Spider mechanicals. Both concepts were designed by Paolo Martin.
