= Buried Dino 246 GTS incident =

1978 incident in Los Angeles, California, US

- Date: February 1978
- Location: Los Angeles, California
- Type: Vehicle theft
- Motive: Insurance fraud
- Target: 1974 Dino 246 GTS
- First reporter: Priscilla Painton
- Outcome: Recovery of allegedly stolen car
- Accused: Rosendo Cruz (vehicles owner)

In January 1978, a stolen 1974 Dino 246 GTS was discovered buried in a yard in Los Angeles, gathering national media attention, although the origins and fate of the car remained a mystery for some time. The car was eventually revealed to have been involved in a more complicated and fraudulent scheme than was first thought.

== Incident ==
=== Disappearance ===
After leaving their anniversary dinner on the evening of December 7, 1974, the original owner of the vehicle, Rosendo Cruz, and his wife, discovered that the vehicle had been stolen. It had been bought only two months earlier, in October, by Cruz, as a present to his wife who had only driven it for about 500 mi (800 km) before it disappeared. In the police report filed afterwards, Cruz stated that after "...noticing a suspicious gleam in the valet’s eye..." he decided to park the car himself some distance from the restaurant.

=== Discovery ===
In February 1978, two boys were playing outside their Los Angeles home, digging in the yard, when one of the boys struck something metallic. They alerted two passing sheriff's deputies, Joe Sabas and Dennis (misreported as Lenny) Carroll, who had a team investigate the object which proved to be a Ferrari Dino. It was initially reported that the car had been stolen in 1974 and buried by the thieves.

During the investigation, it was discovered that the thieves had clumsily attempted to preserve the car by covering it with plastic, tarps, and carpets, but left the windows open. Despite being buried for about three years, the car was reported to be in fairly good condition, although an investigator for Farmers Insurance found this not to be the case, citing corrosion in the body and interior, along with non-burial-related damage to the roof, engine compartment, and windshield that presumably occurred as the car was being recovered.

== Aftermath ==
Media coverage resulted in a flood of phone calls to Farmers asking about purchasing the Dino. Hoping to capitalize on the publicity, the company decided to sell the car in a special auction with sealed bids, placing it on display for two weeks in a private warehouse. The plan backfired; while it was on display, thieves stripped the car of "almost everything not bolted down, including her oil dip stick." Farmers then discovered that many of the bids were illegitimate and invited the original callers to submit new bids.

It was subsequently discovered that the owner, plumber Rosendo Cruz, had conspired to commit insurance fraud with the supposed thieves. The thieves were to take the Dino to a chop shop to be broken up for parts, but instead hid it, intending to dig it up later – forgetting the burial location.

Real estate businessman Brad Howard purchased the car from Farmers, to which ownership had defaulted, and had it restored by Ferrari expert Giuseppe Cappalonga. Due to the drought conditions during the car's burial, there was relatively little rust. It was registered with a vanity license plate reading "DUG UP" to represent the vehicle's unusual history. As of 2019, it was in perfect running condition in Howard's possession. It was easily restored and has been very active since 1978 when he purchased it. The owner continued to drive it regularly, taking it to car shows and classic races.
