= Rolls-Royce Camargue =

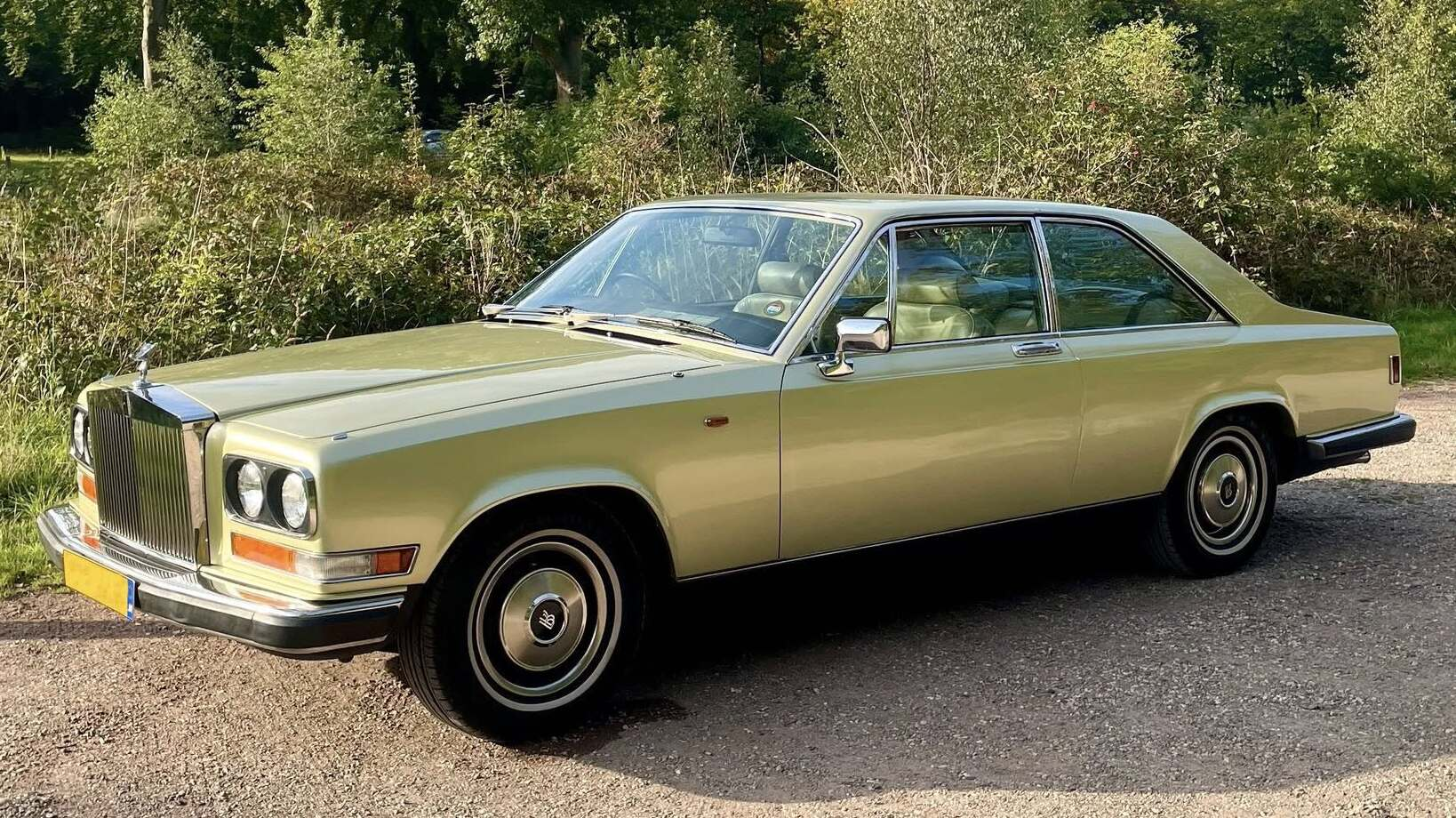

Overview
- Manufacturer: Rolls-Royce Motors
- Production: 1975–1986; 531 produced
- Assembly: United Kingdom: Crewe, Cheshire, England
- Designer: Paolo Martin at Pininfarina

Body and chassis
- Class: Luxury car
- Body style: 2-door saloon
- Layout: FR layout
- Related: Rolls-Royce Silver Shadow; Rolls-Royce Corniche; Bentley T-series

Powertrain
- Engine: 6.75 L (412 cid) Rolls-Royce V8
- Transmission: 3-speed TH400 automatic

Dimensions
- Wheelbase: 3,048 mm (120 in)
- Length: 5,169 mm (203.5 in)
- Width: 1,918 mm (75.5 in)
- Height: 1,473 mm (58 in)
- Curb weight: 2,329 kg (5,135 lb)

The Rolls-Royce Camargue is a 2-door luxury saloon manufactured and marketed by Rolls-Royce Motors from 1975–1986. Designed by Paolo Martin at Pininfarina, the Camargue was the first post-war production Rolls-Royce not designed in-house (not including the more prolific coachbuilt Corniche by Mulliner-Park Ward, and the coachbuilt variants of production models such as Silver Wraith, Silver Cloud, and Silver Shadow which were built by firms such as James Young, Mulliner, Park Ward, Hooper, et al).

The Camargue derives its name from the coastal region in southern France.

== Debut and design ==
At launch, the Camargue was the Rolls-Royce flagship and the most expensive production car in the world. At its official U.S. launch, the Camargue had already been on sale in the UK for over a year. The New York Times noted that the U.S. price at this stage was approximately $5,000 higher than the UK price. In the 1970s, many European models retailed for significantly less in the U.S. than they did in Europe in order to compete with prices set aggressively by Detroit's Big Three and Japanese importers. The manufacturer rejected this approach with the Camargue, referencing the high cost of safety and pollution engineering needed to adapt the few cars (approximately 30 per year) it expected to send to North America in 1976.

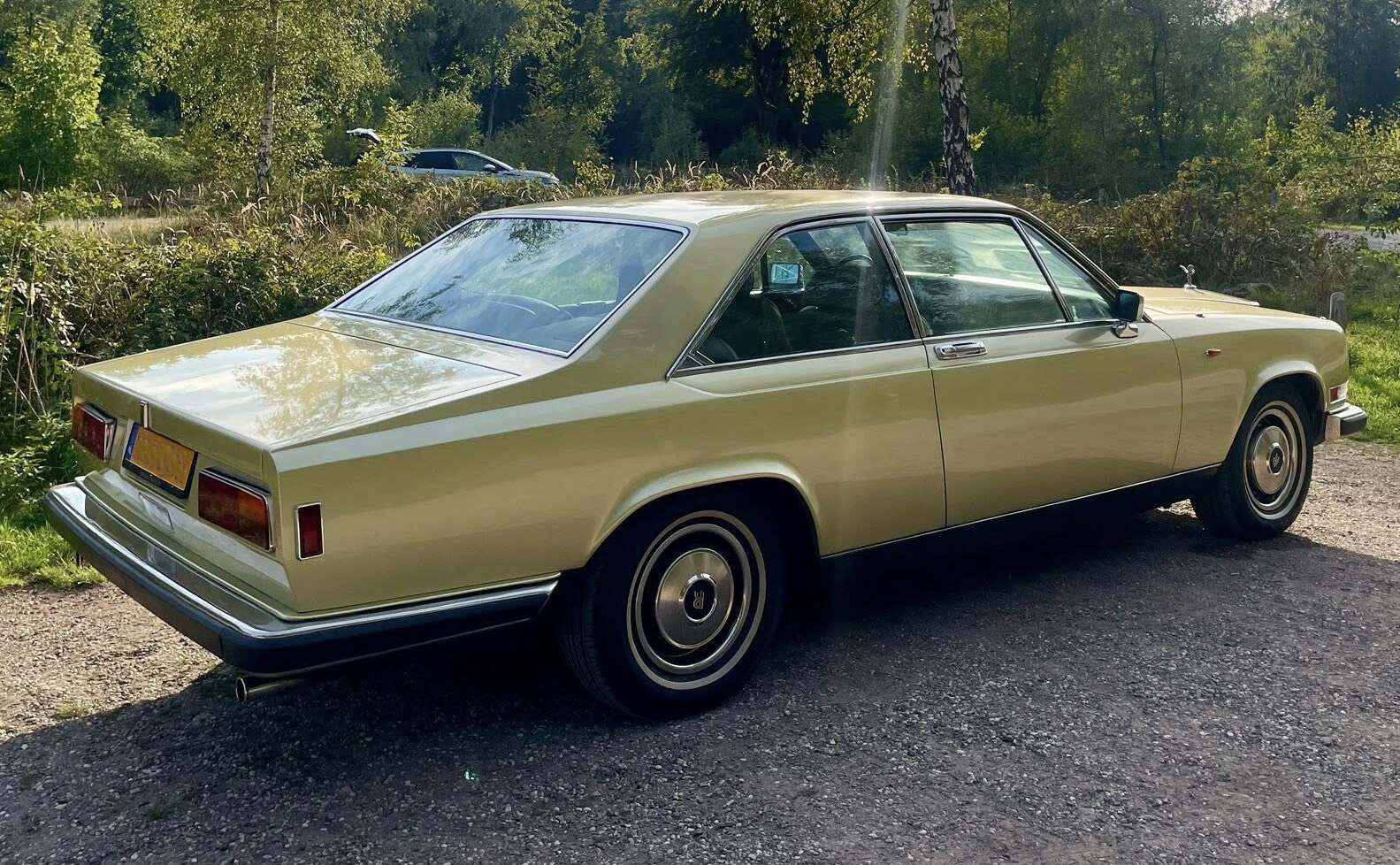
1980 Rolls-Royce Camargue rear 3/4 view

At its 1975 press debut, Rolls-Royce highlighted automatic split-level climate control system, the first of its kind. According to Rolls-Royce, the system's development took eight years. The recommended price of a new Camargue at launch on the UK market in March 1975 was £29,250, including sales taxes. Rapid currency depreciation would greatly raise the price of the Camargue in the late 1970s, both in the UK and North America.

The Camargue shared its platform with the Rolls-Royce Corniche and Silver Shadow and was powered by the same 6.75 L (411.9 cu in) V8 engine as the Silver Shadow, although the Camargue engine was slightly more powerful. The transmission was also carried over – a General Motors Turbo-Hydramatic 3-speed automatic. The first 65 Camargues produced used SU carburettors, while the remaining carburetted cars used Solex units. US delivered cars used Bosch Jetronic fuel injection during the 1980s which it shared with the Corniche and Silver Spirit/Spur. The Camargue was fitted with the Silver Shadow II's power rack and pinion steering rack in February 1977. In 1979, it received the rear independent suspension of the Silver Spirit.

With a 3,048 mm (120 in) wheelbase, the Camargue was the first Rolls-Royce automobile to be designed to metric dimensions, and was the first Rolls-Royce to feature an inclined rather than perfectly vertical grille; the Camargue's grille was slanted at an angle of seven degrees.

The car was sold in very limited numbers in European, American, Canadian, Australian and Asian markets. Several of the cars have since been modified into convertibles by after-market customizers.

== Reception ==
The Camargue received a varied reception, having ranked as one of the "10 Worst Cars" as chosen in 2010 by readers of The Globe and Mail; and having ranked 92 in a 2008 poll of the 100 ugliest cars of all time by readers of The Daily Telegraph. Autoblog said the Camargue had been ranked "conspicuously low on the list," adding the Camargue "really was horrid, no matter how well it sold."

In response, noted automotive journalist James May said the Camargue "is not ugly, either. It has presence, like that pug-faced but well-dressed bloke down the pub."

In his 2019 study of the car, Bernard L. King argues that the Camargue was an important statement-car, proving that the motor-division of Rolls-Royce could bring new product to market after its near financial ruin following the collapse and nationalisation of the Rolls-Royce aero-division. In addition, its high price-point not only raised much needed revenue for the cash-strapped motor company, it also acted as a "halo" car avant la lettre, generating new customer interest in the marque, showroom footfall, and increased sales of the relatively more economical Silver Shadows. As King writes:

It proved to be what is known in the motor industry as a "traffic builder". [...] When the 1976 Rolls-Royce sales figures for the USA were totalled, it was revealed that there had been a massive 42 percent increase over those in 1975, with 1,230 cars delivered to customers compared with the 1975 figure of 865. This substantial increase David Plastow [then managing director of Rolls-Royce] put down to 'the heightened awareness of the Rolls-Royce marquee [sic] generated by the introduction of the Camargue to the American market'.
