= Dino 206 GT and 246 GT =

Sports cars

Dino 206 GT Dino 246 GT and GTS
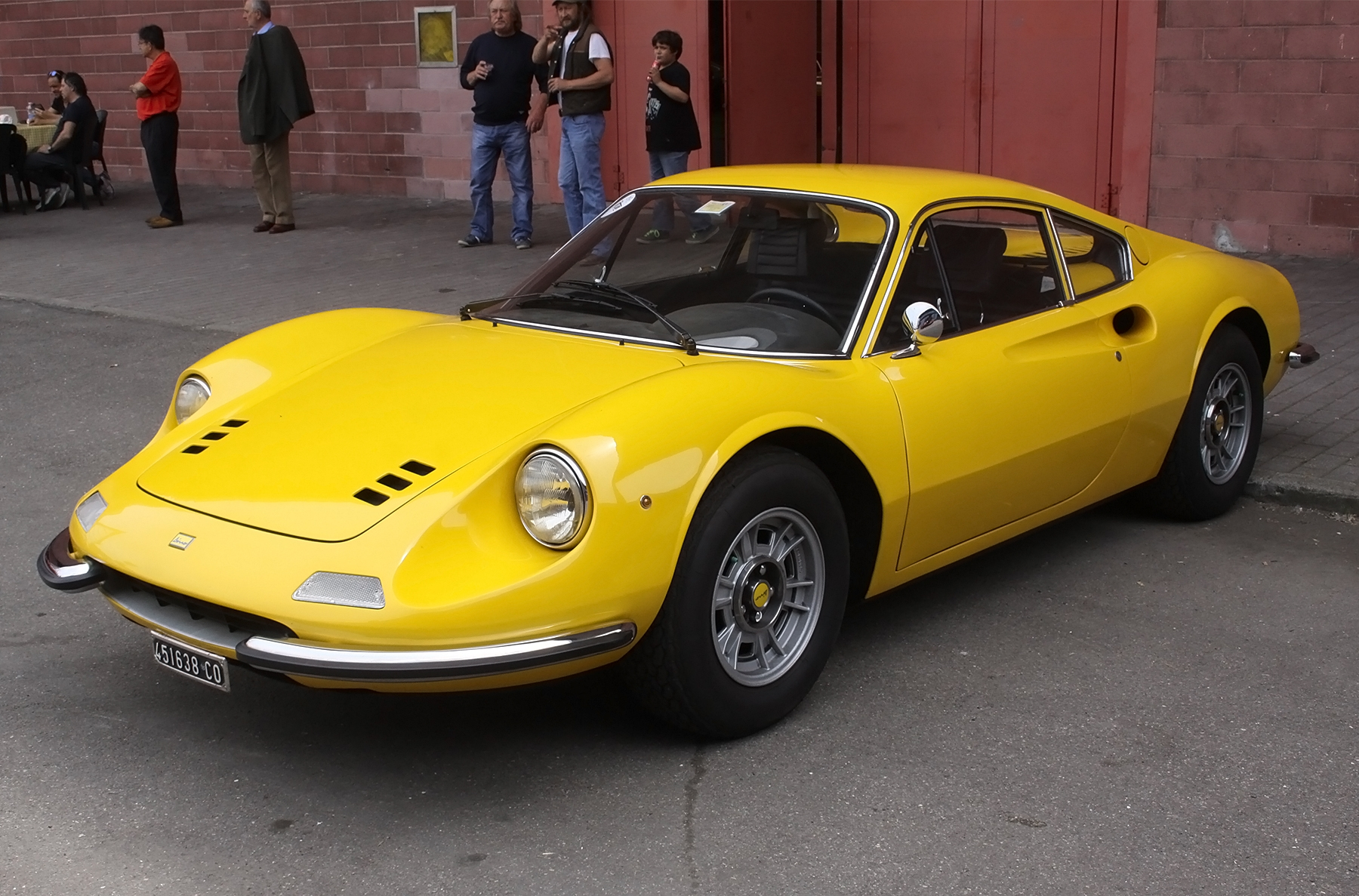
- Dino 246 GT

Overview
- Manufacturer: Ferrari
- Designer: Pininfarina; Aldo Brovarone; Leonardo Fioravanti

Body and chassis
- Class: Sports car (S)
- Layout: Transverse, rear mid-engine, rear-wheel-drive

Powertrain
- Engine: Dino 65° V6

Chronology
- Successor: Dino 308 GT4 2+2 & Ferrari 308 GTB/GTS

The Dino 206 GT, 246 GT and 246 GTS are V6 mid-engined sports cars produced by Ferrari and sold under the Dino marque between 1967 and 1974.

The Dino 246 was the first automobile manufactured by Ferrari in high numbers. It is lauded by many for its intrinsic driving qualities and groundbreaking design. In 2004, Sports Car International placed the car at number six on its list of Top Sports Cars of the 1970s. Motor Trend Classic placed the 206/246 at number seven in their list of the 10 "Greatest Ferraris of all time".

== Dino 206 GT ==
Dino 206 GT
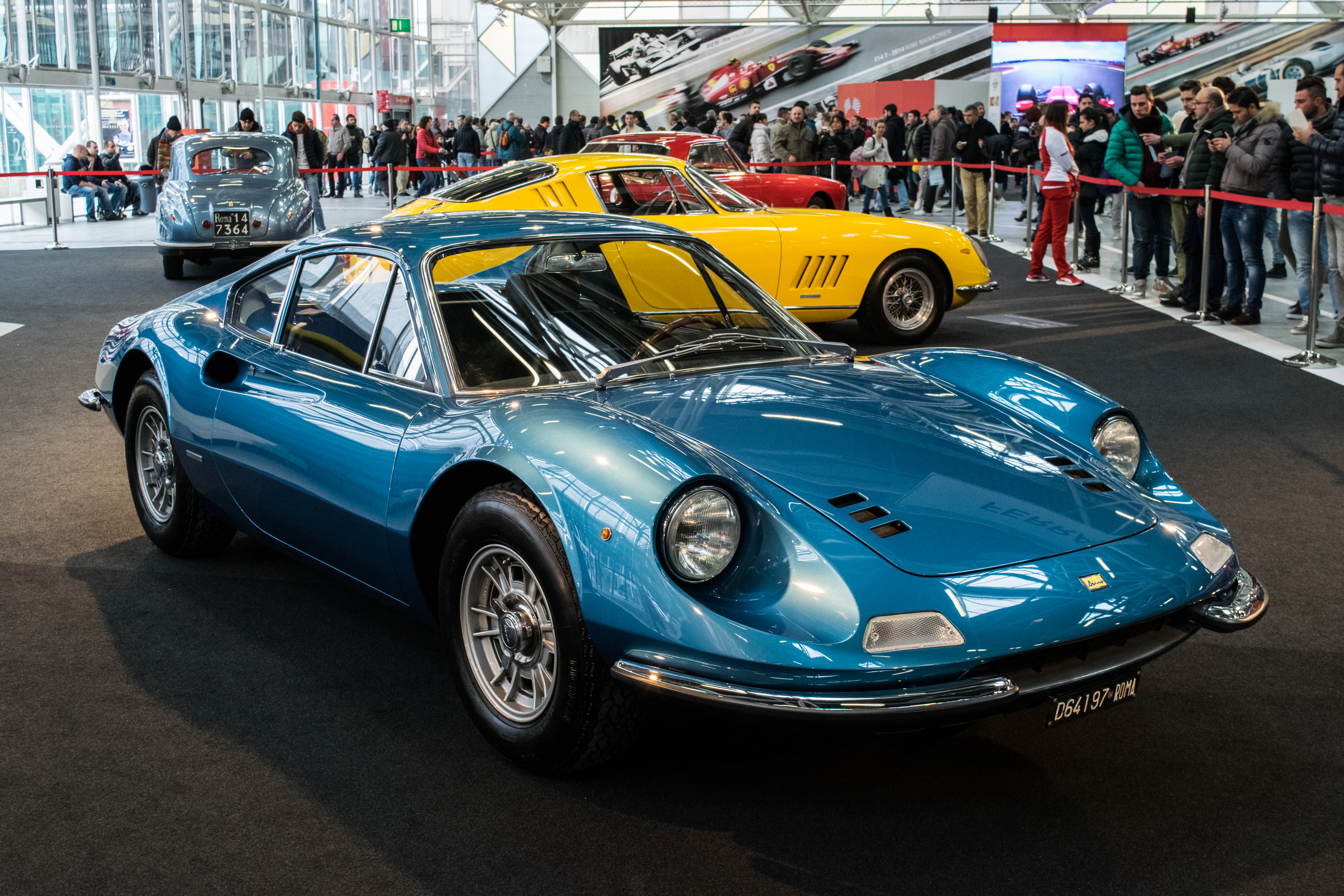

Overview
- Also called: Ferrari Dino 206 GT
- Production: 1967–1969; 152 produced
- Assembly: Italy: Modena

Body and chassis
- Body style: 2-door berlinetta

Powertrain
- Engine: 2.0 L (1,986.60 cc) Dino 65° V6
- Transmission: 5-speed manual

Dimensions
- Wheelbase: 2,280 mm (90 in)
- Length: 4,150 mm (163 in)
- Width: 1,700 mm (67 in)
- Height: 1,115 mm (44 in)
- Kerb weight: 900 kg (1,984.2 lb) (dry)

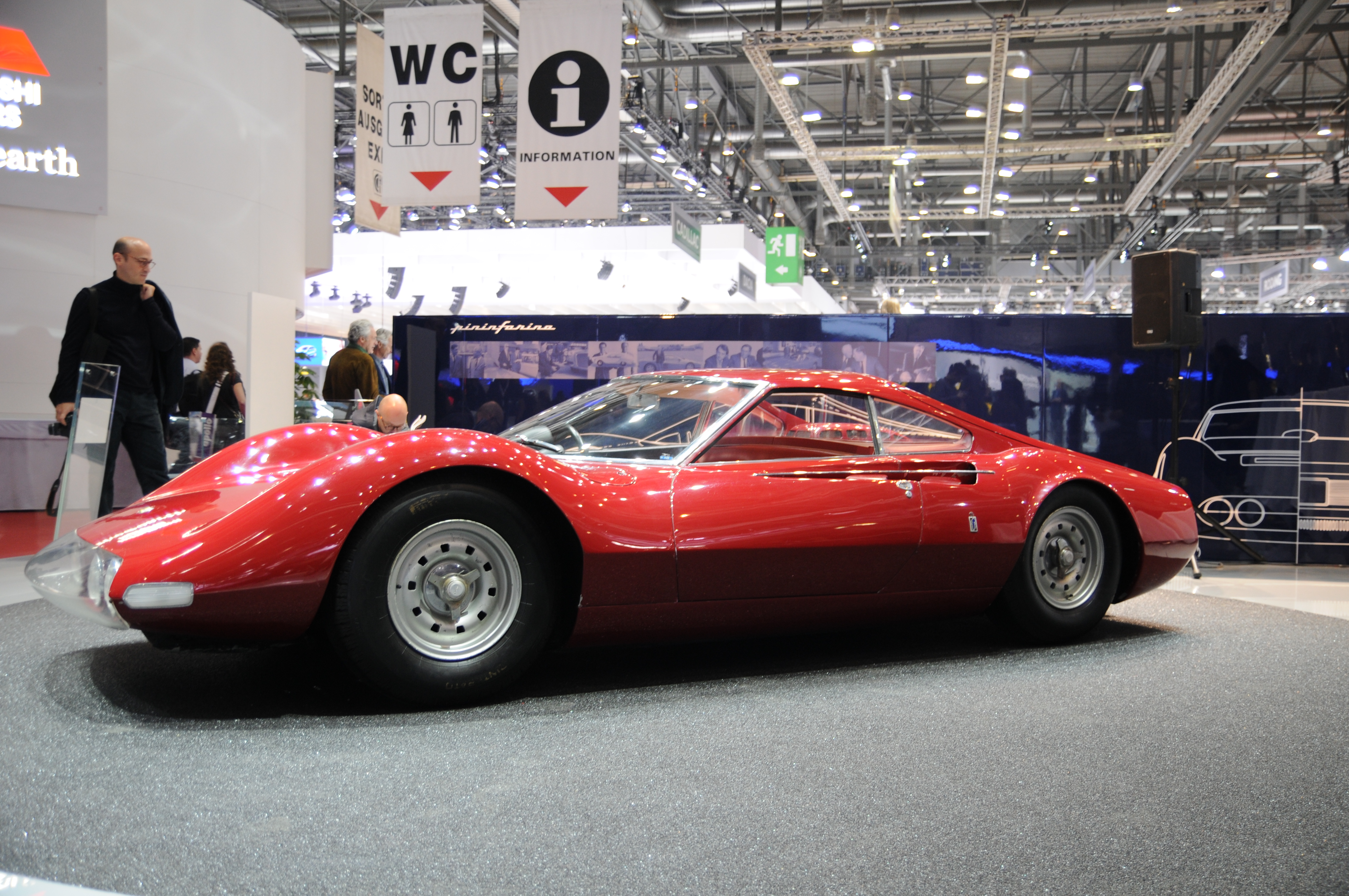
Dino Berlinetta Speciale, the concept design that inspired the 206 GT

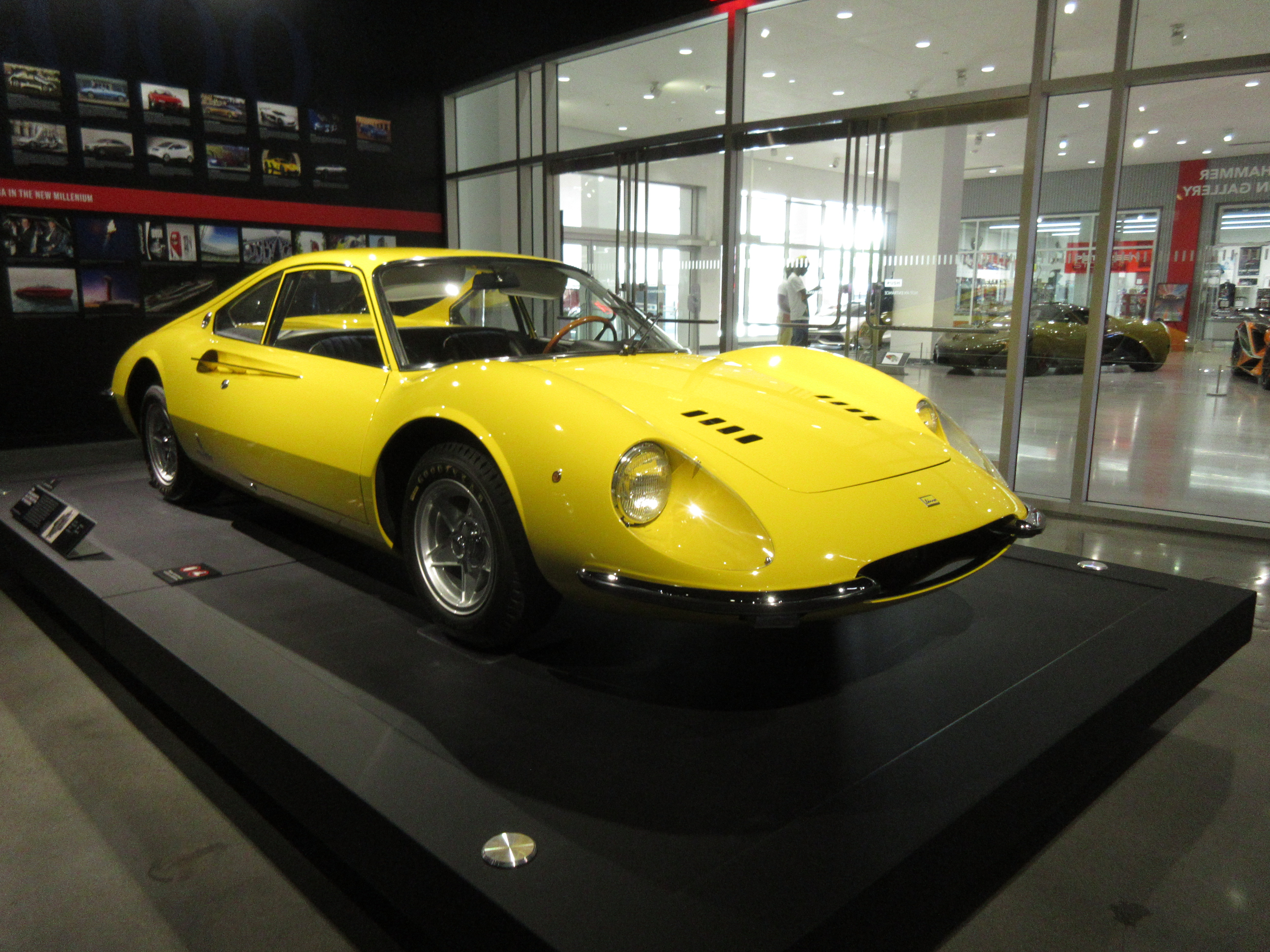
Dino Berlinetta GT prototype s/n 00106, displayed at the Petersen Automotive Museum

The production Dino 206 GT was designed by Aldo Brovarone and Leonardo Fioravanti at Pininfarina and built by Scaglietti. It had the soft edges and curving lines typical of earlier Italian cars, unlike its angular successor, the 308 GT4.

The 206 GT used a transverse-mounted 2.0 litre all-aluminium, 65-degree V6 engine with dual overhead camshafts and a 9:1 compression ratio, making 180 PS (178 bhp; 132 kW) at the 8,000 rpm redline. Torque was 138 lb⋅ft (187 N⋅m) at 6,500 rpm. The crankshaft featured four main bearings. Induction was via three Weber 40 DCN/4 2-barrel carburetors. The 206 GT was the first car sold by Ferrari which used an electronic ignition, a Dinoplex C capacitive discharge ignition system that was developed by Magneti Marelli for the high revving Dino V6 engine. It was also the first Ferrari product to have a direct rack-and-pinion steering.

The 206 GT frame featured a light-weight, aluminium body, full independent suspension, and all round disc brakes. It had a 90.0-inch (2,290 mm) wheelbase and a top speed of 146 mph (235 km/h).

152 were built in total between 1967 and 1969, in left hand drive only.

The same 2.0 L (1,986.60 cc) engine was used in the Fiat Dino Coupe and Spider, produced during the same period. The conversion of the Dino 206 SP/S twin-cam racing engine for road-going use in the Dino (and the two Fiat models) was entrusted by Fiat to Aurelio Lampredi, to whom Ferrari owed so many great engines. Lampredi, interviewed in the early 1980s (he died in 1989 at the age of 71), noted that, "Things didn't work out exactly as Ferrari had foreseen." Ferrari had counted on building the engines at Maranello, but Fiat's management insisted on taking control of production, to avoid any breaks in the engine supply.

Fiat quoted 160 hp (119 kW) DIN for the Fiat Dino and Coupé, and in 1967 Ferrari – presenting the first prototype of the Dino 206 GT – claimed 180 hp (134 kW). This, however, was not the case. Both engines were made by Fiat workers in Turin on the same production line, without any discrimination as to their destination, and all were identical. 150 units were simply taken from the first production batch at the beginning of 1968 to power the Dino 206 GTs.

Later Fiat Dinos also used the 2.4L engine, although significantly fewer were produced with this engine.

== Dino 246 GT and GTS ==
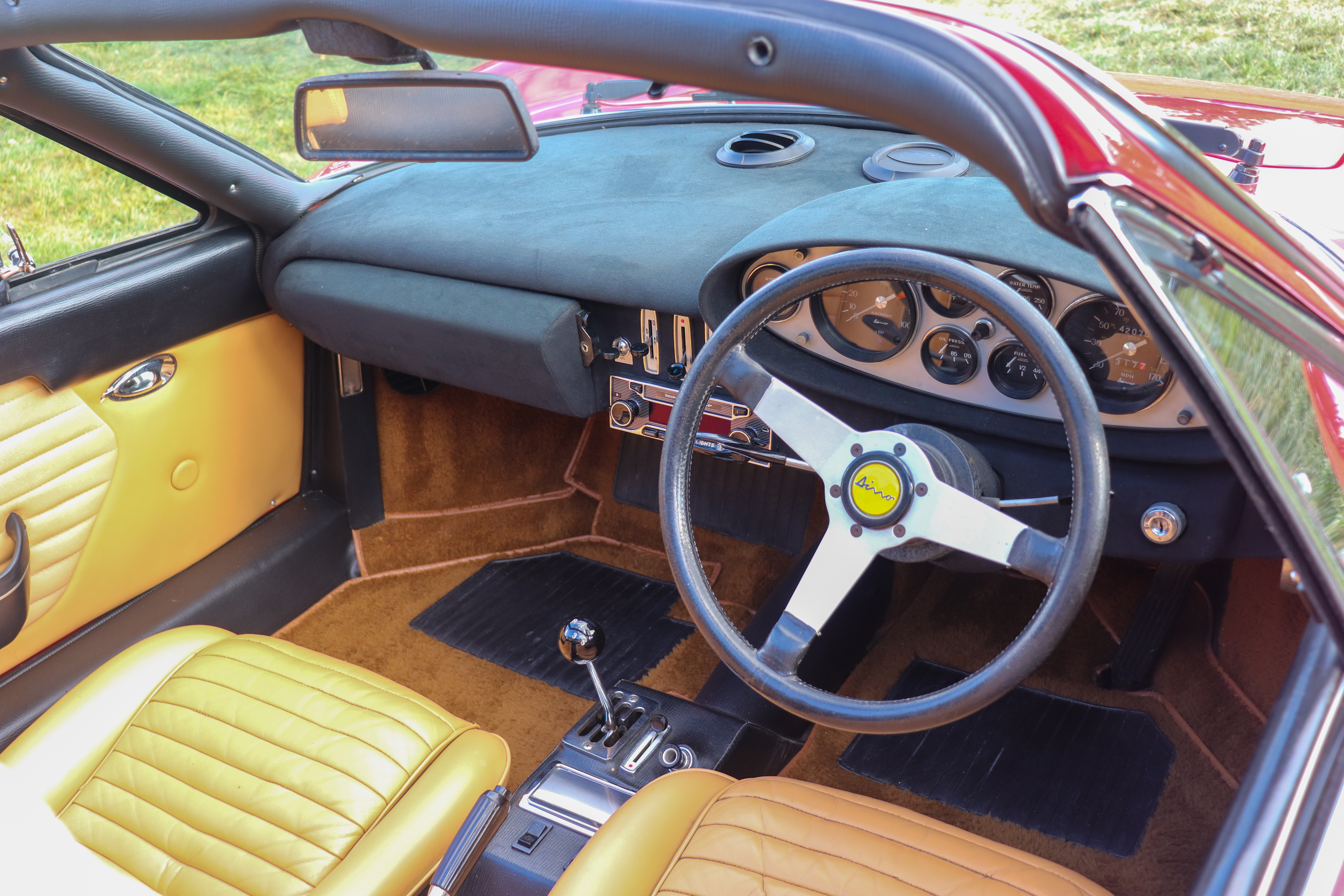
1972 Dino 246 GTS interior

Dino 246 GT Dino 246 GTS
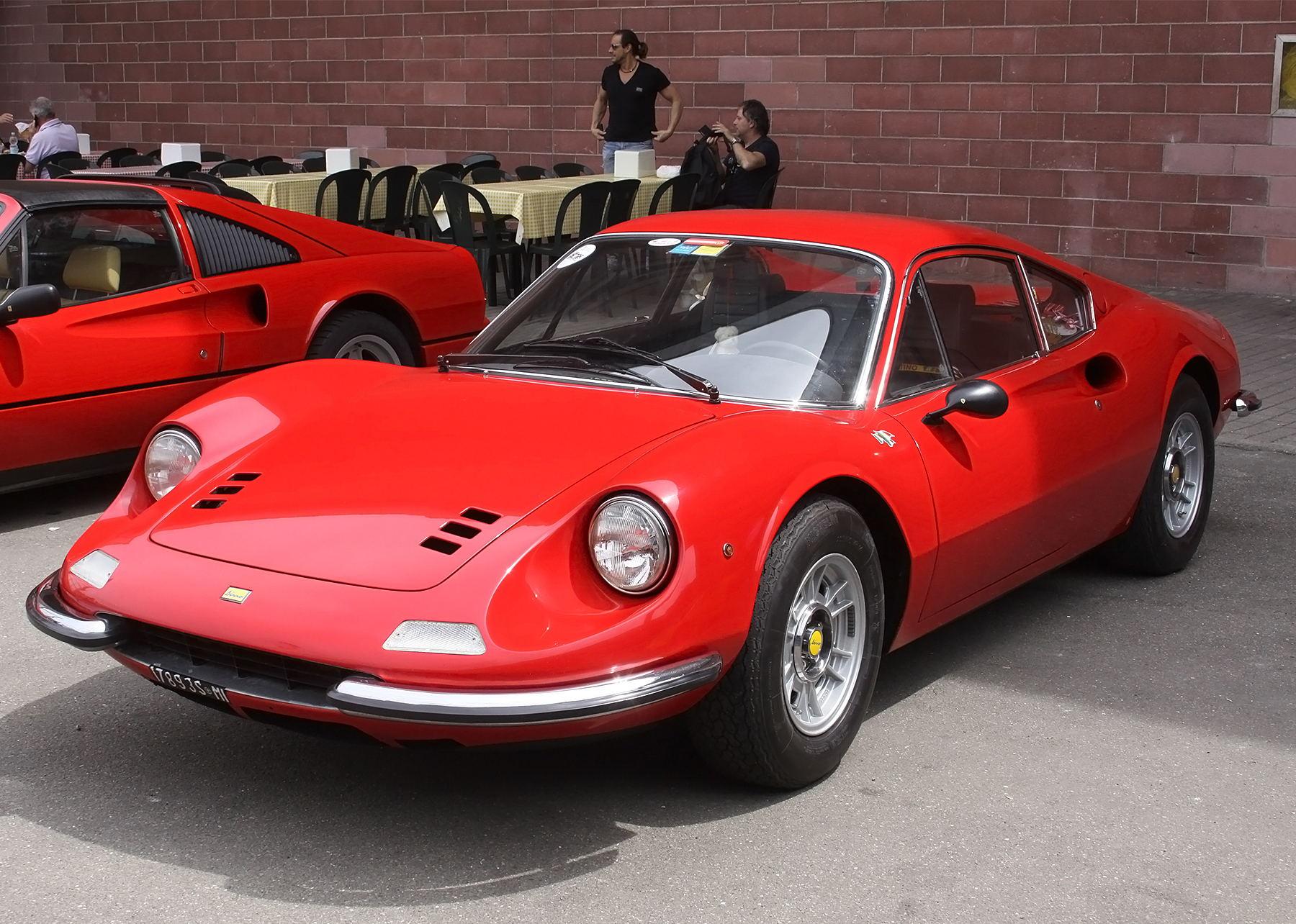
- 1970 Dino 246 GT

Overview
- Also called: Ferrari Dino 246 GT; Ferrari Dino 246 GTS
- Production: 1969–1974; 3,569 produced
- Assembly: Italy: Modena

Body and chassis
- Body style: 2-door berlinetta (GT); 2-door targa top (GTS)

Powertrain
- Engine: 2.4 L (2,419.20 cc) Dino 65° V6
- Transmission: 5-speed manual all-synchromesh

Dimensions
- Wheelbase: 2,340 mm (92 in)
- Length: 4,235 mm (167 in)
- Width: 1,700 mm (67 in)
- Height: 1,135 mm (45 in)
- Kerb weight: 1,080 kg (2,381.0 lb) (dry)

Calls for more power were answered with the 2.4 L (2,419.20 cc) Dino 65° V6 engine, DOHC, 2 valves per cylinder, 9.0:1 compression ratio, iron block with alloy heads. It produced 195 PS (192 bhp; 143 kW) at 7,600 rpm and 226 N⋅m; 166 lbf⋅ft (23 kg⋅m) at 5,500 rpm of torque, and was available as a fixed-top GT coupé or, after 1971, an open Spyder GTS. A detuned American version had an exhaust air pump, and timing changes which resulted in 175 hp (130 kW). The GT had 3X2-barrel 40 DCNF/6 or 40 DCNF/7 Weber carburetors. For the 246 a new version of the Dinoplex ignition was deployed, the more compact Magneti Marelli AEC103A system.

The 246 Dino GT weighed 2,380 lb (1,080 kg). The 246 Dino GTS weighed 2,426 lb (1,100 kg). The body was now mostly made of steel to save cost. The 246 Dino had a 2.1-inch (53 mm) longer wheelbase than the 206, at 92.1 inches (2,340 mm). The height of the 246 was the same as the 206 at 43.9 inches (1,120 mm). The new car had a revised interior. Other differences were 2 rows of 7 vents on the slightly longer engine lid of the 246 instead of 6 and a fuel cap flap cover instead of the exposed one of the 206.

Dino 246 production numbered 2,295 GT coupés and 1,274 GTS spyders, the latter being built after the Series III revision from 1972 to 1974 only, for a total production run of 3,569 cars. Three series of the Dino were built, with differences in wheels, windshield wiper coverage, and engine ventilation. The Series I cars (also known as L series), 357 of which were built until the summer of 1970, used the same center-bolt wheels and "clapping hands" windscreen wipers as did the 206. Series II cars (M series, built until July 1971 in 507 examples) received five-bolt Cromodora alloys and parallel moving wipers. The Series III cars (E series) had minor differences in gearing and fuel supply, and were built at a much higher rate as sales in the United States commenced with this version. 1,431 Series III GT coupés and 1,274 GTS removable top cars were built.

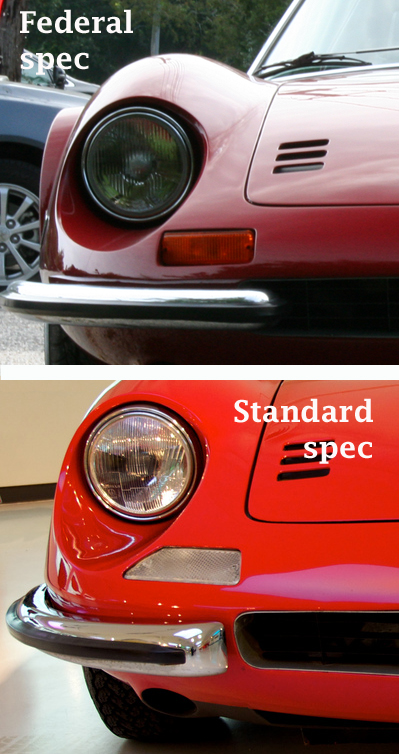
US market Dino compared with standard model

The 246 had a claimed top speed of 146 mph (235 km/h), although in July 1971 a road test by Britain's Motor magazine reported a top speed of 148 mph (238 km/h), which compared favourably with the 136 mph (219 km/h) achieved by a recently tested (though by now replaced) Porsche 911S. With a 0 to 50 mph (0 to 80 km/h) acceleration time of 5.5 seconds the Dino narrowly outperformed the Porsche again, although the Porsche was narrowly the winner on fuel economy. The manufacturer's recommended UK retail price of £5,485 was higher than the £5,211 asked for the Porsche. For comparison, the much larger, four-passenger Citroën SM high-performance luxury coupe sold for £4,700.

A Dino 246 GTS won the Cannonball Baker Sea-to-Shining-Sea Memorial Trophy Dash in 1975.

In one 1978 incident, a Dino 246 GTS was discovered buried in a yard by some Los Angeles children. The car was later found to be the subject of an elaborate insurance fraud perpetrated by the owner.

The Dino's 2.4 L V6 was also used in the Fiat Dino 2400 and the Lancia Stratos rally car.

Minor trim differentiated various markets, including side marker lights required in the US market. Group 4-style flared wheelarches were optional, as were seats from the 365 GTB/4 Daytona, the pair often ordered in conjunction with wide, sand-cast Campagnolo alloy wheels.

246 GTS at the Museo Casa Enzo Ferrari

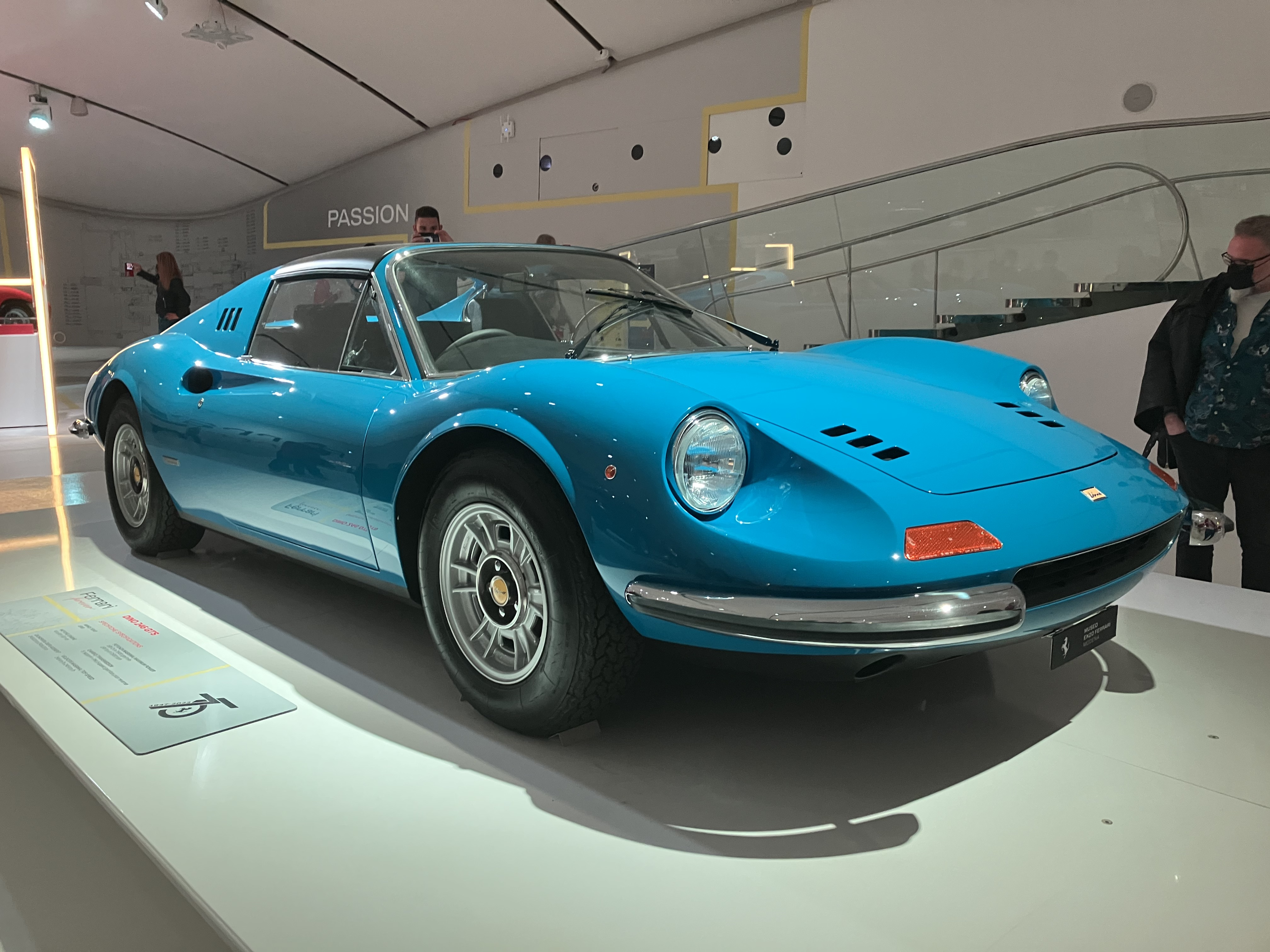

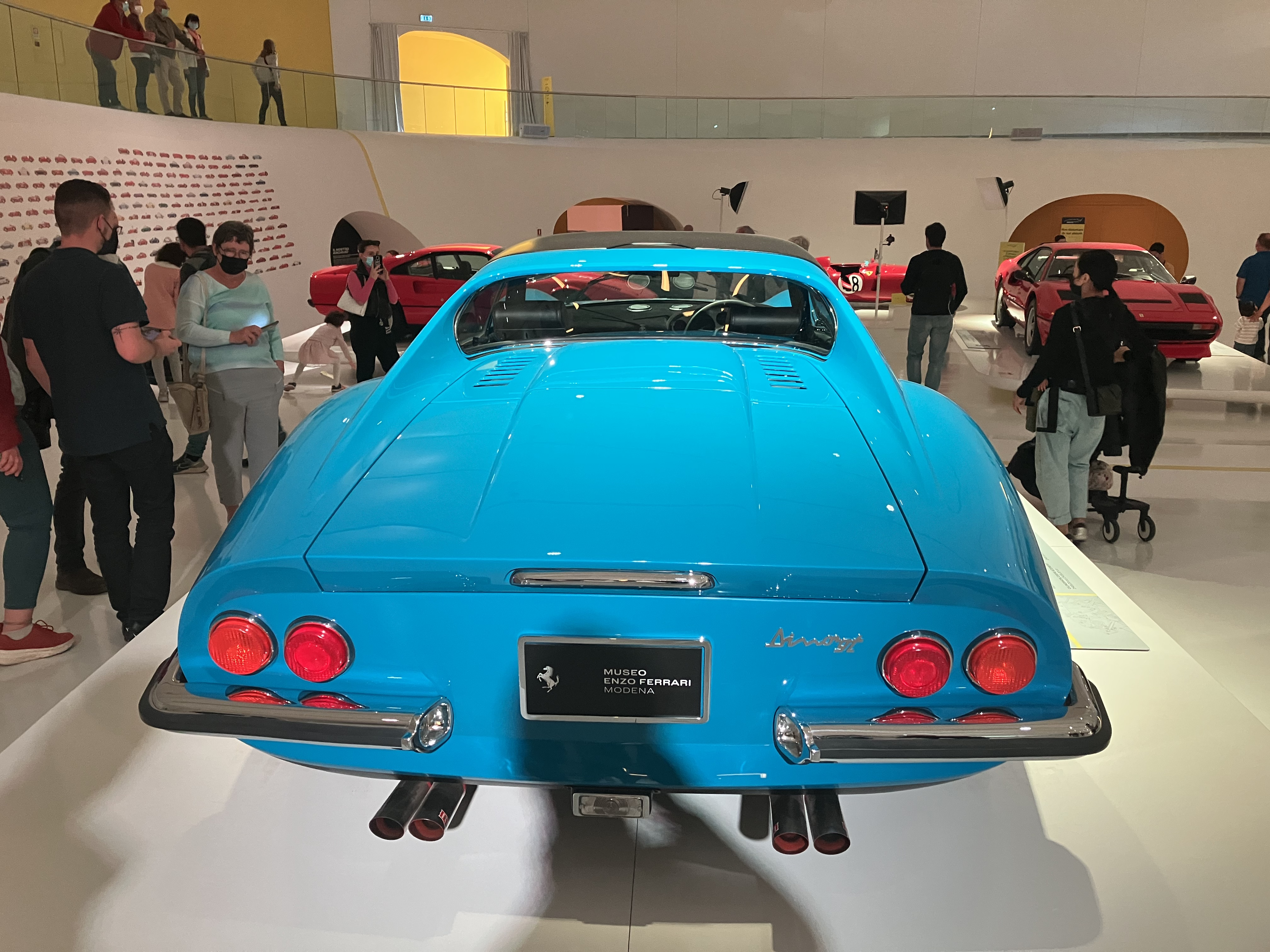

=== John Corbani and the "Do-It-All Dino" ===
One of the most well-known individual Dino 246 GTs was chassis number 04504, owned by California enthusiast John Corbani. A retired electronics engineer from Santa Barbara, Corbani became a prominent figure on the FerrariChat online forum, where he documented his experiences with the car in extensive detail. Unlike many owners who kept such cars as low-mileage collectibles, Corbani used his 1972 Dino as a daily driver for more than two decades, accumulating over 150,000 miles under his ownership and more than 190,000 miles in total. Corbani performed much of the mechanical work himself, including an engine rebuild at 181,000 miles and regular valve adjustments. He also made practical modifications, such as repainting the car from its original Bianco Polo Park to Midnight Blue Metallic and fitting Gotti wheels. The car was frequently used for unconventional purposes – such as commuting, long-distance trips, and even towing light equipment – which earned it the nickname “Do-It-All Dino” in Forza magazine. Following Corbani’s death in 2009, the car was sold and exported to Germany in 2009 and later re-imported to the United States in 2023. Its history has been noted in Matthias Bartz’s Dino Compendium and other enthusiast publications, and the car’s provenance as the “Ex-John Corbani Dino” accompanied its US$300,000 sale at a Bring a Trailer auction in August 2024. Corbani’s approach to ownership – prioritizing driving and maintenance over strict preservation – has continued to be discussed within the Ferrari community as an alternative ethos toward classic Ferrari use.
