= Paolo Martin =

Italian car designer widely (born 1943)

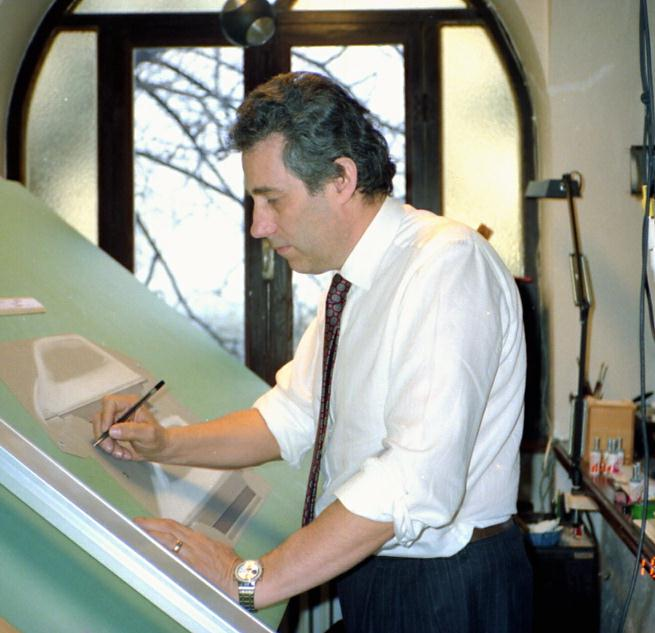
- Martin in 2000
- Born: 7 May 1943 (age 83); Turin, Italy
- Occupation: Automotive, boat and motorcycle designer
- Known for: Fiat 130 Coupe, Rolls-Royce Camargue and the Ferrari Modulo

Paolo Martin (born 1943) is an Italian car designer widely known for his career with Studio Tecnico Michelotti, Carrozzeria Bertone, Pininfarina and De Tomaso/Ghia where he styled the Ferrari Dino Berlinetta Competizione, Ferrari Modulo concept, Fiat 130 Coupé and the Rolls-Royce Camargue.

== Background and career ==
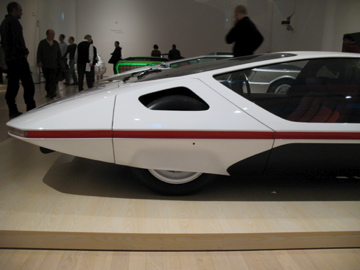
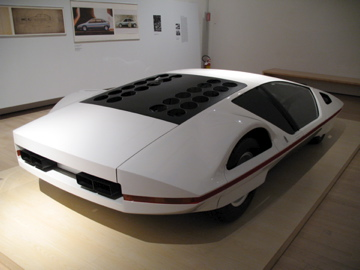
Ferrari Modulo.

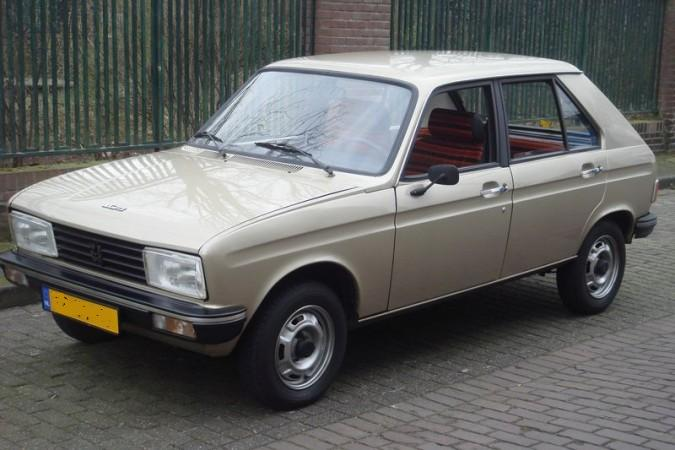
Peugeot 104

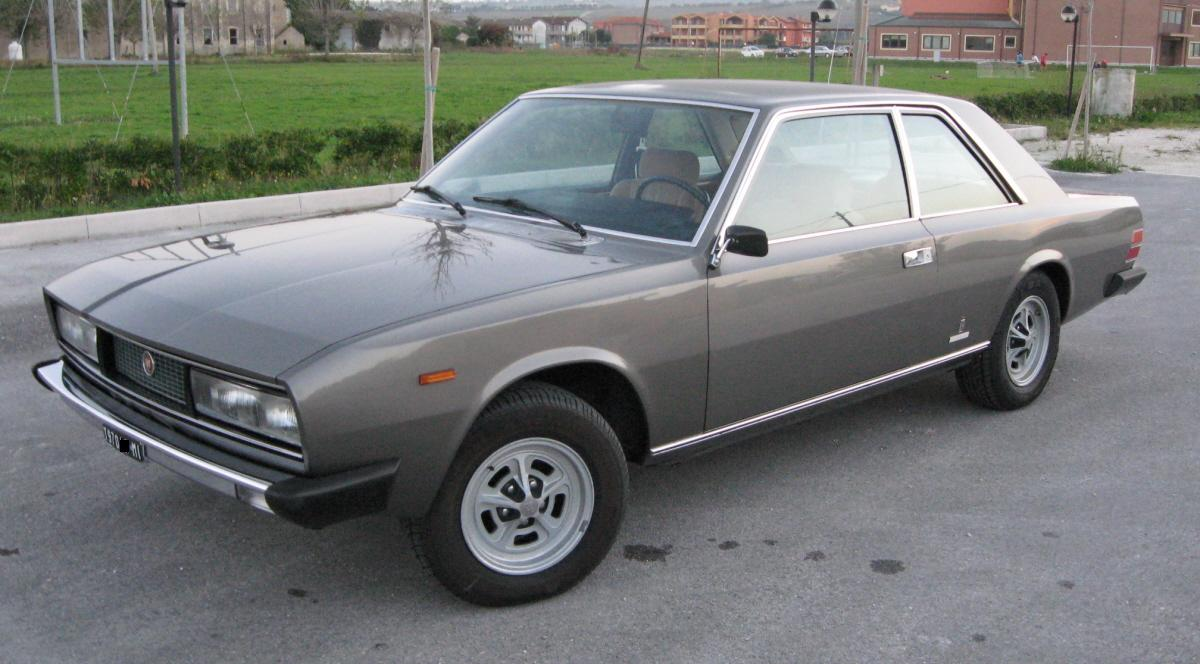
Fiat 130 Coupé

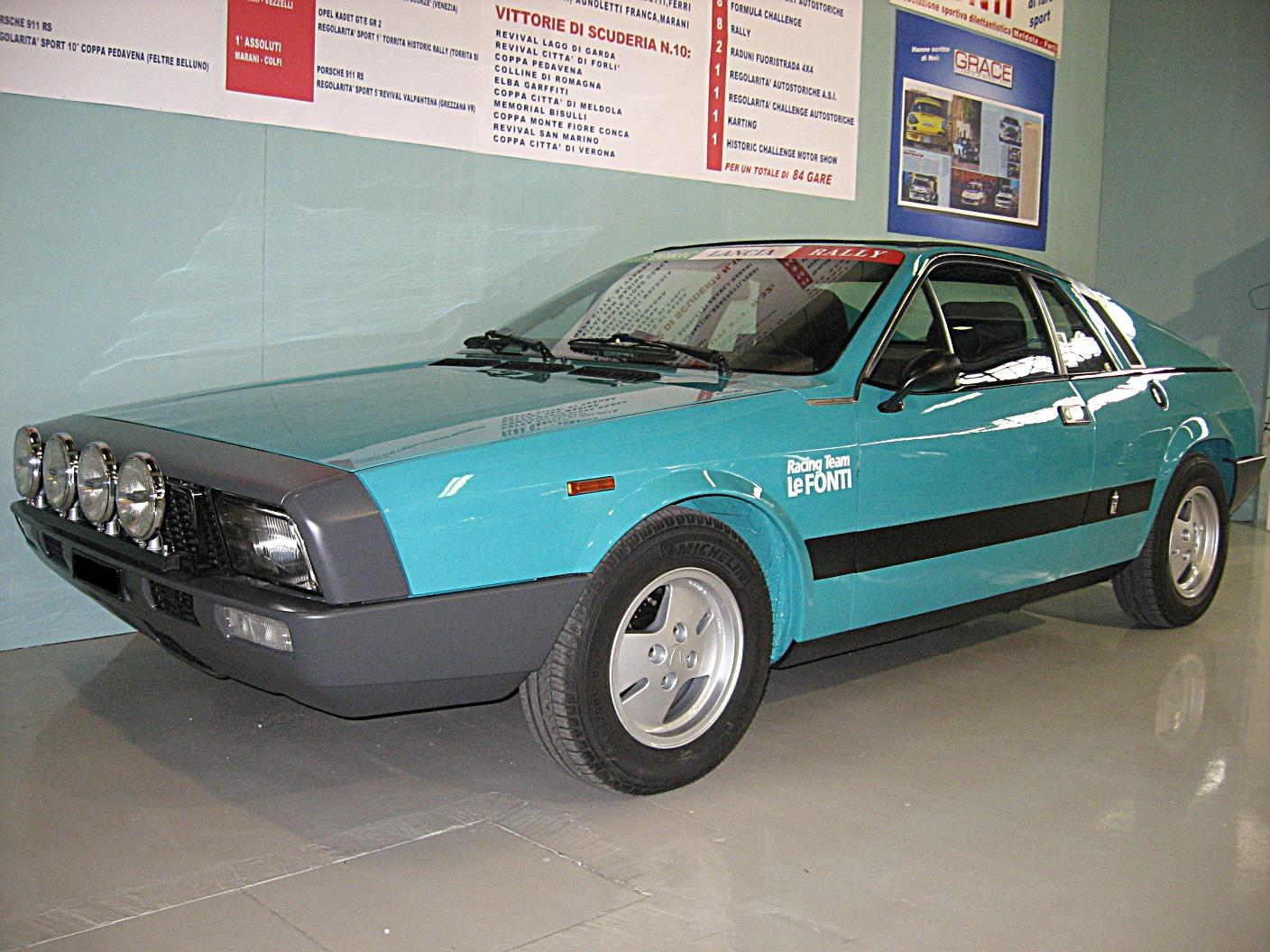
Lancia Beta Montecarlo

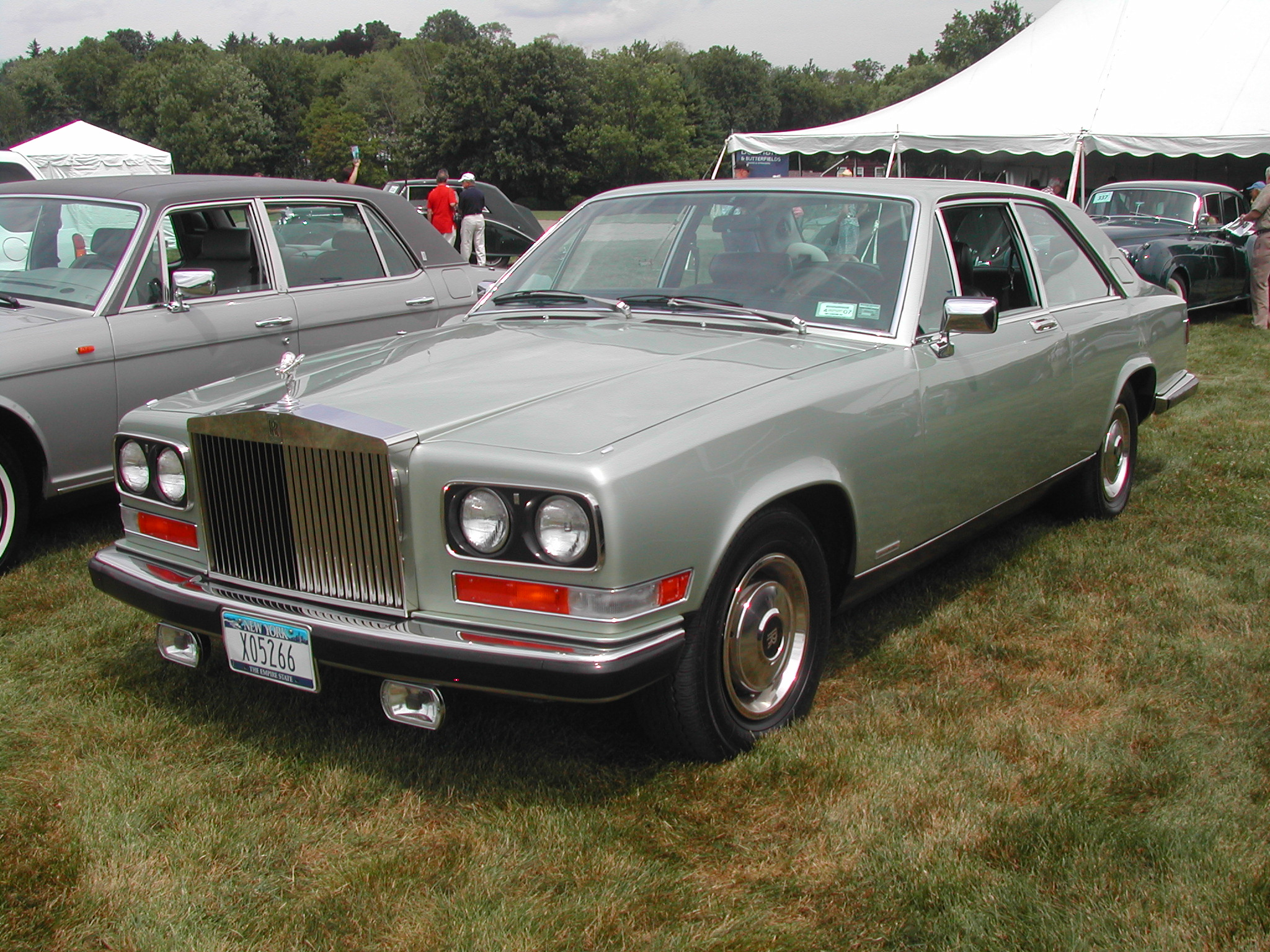
1982 Rolls-Royce Camargue

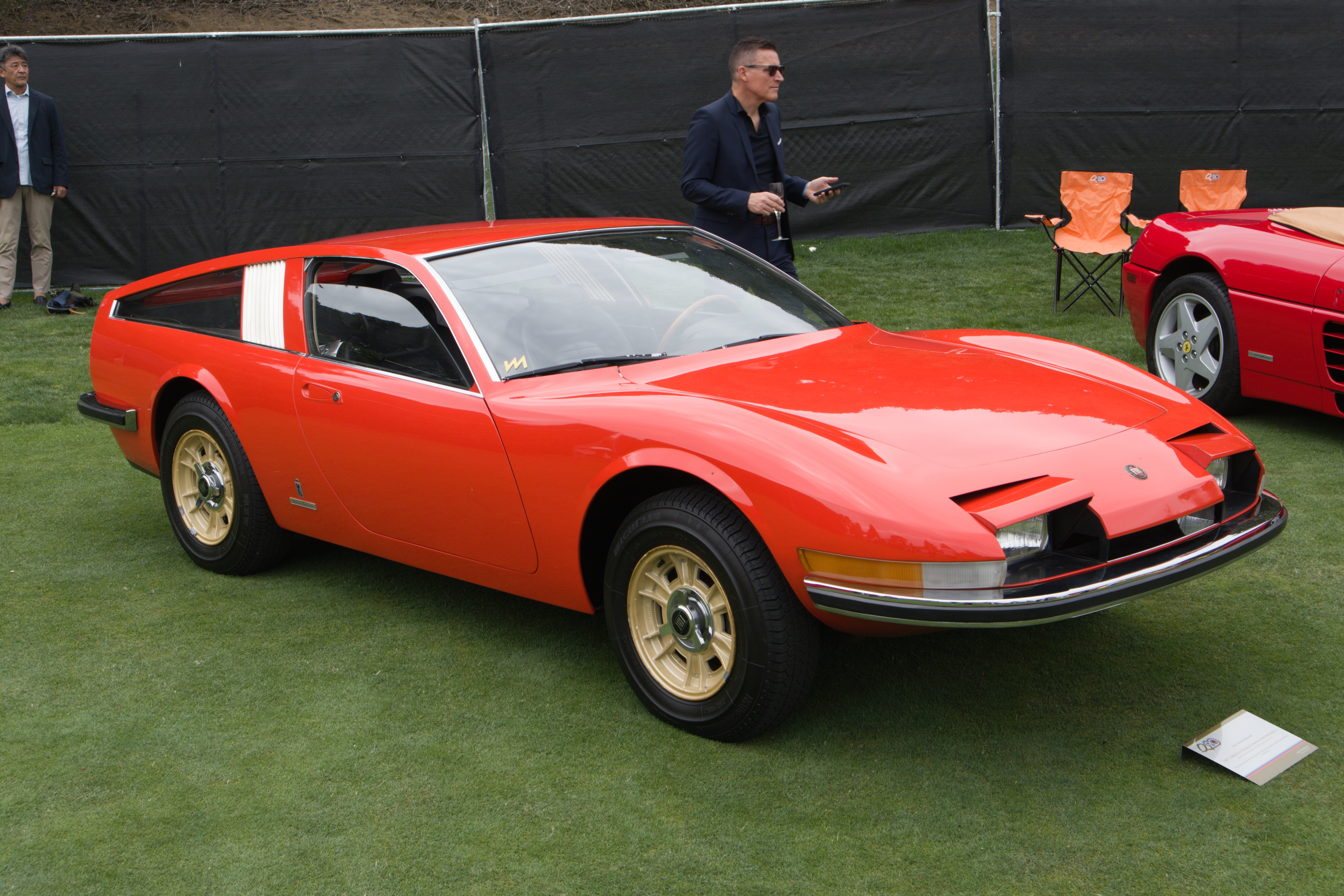
1968 Fiat Dino Ginevra

Born in Turin, Italy in 1943, Martin began working in 1960 for Giovanni Michelotti's Studio Tecnico Michelotti. In 1967, he started to work for Carrozzeria Bertone, and one year later, in 1968 he became Chief of the Styling Department at Carrozzeria Pininfarina. He subsequently worked for De Tomaso (1972–76), where he was Style Center Director for Ghia.

Martin's work has included motorcycle and boat design, as well as automotive projects for Stutz, Bugatti, Ferrari, Peugeot, Alfa Romeo as well as Triumph. Since 1976 he has headed a Turin-based independent design consultancy, with clients including Fiat, Nissan, BMW, Subaru, Piaggio, Moto Guzzi, Gilera, Ferretti Kraft, Cigarette, Magnum Marine and Dassault Aviation. He participated in the Auto 2011 Design Conference, in Zagreb, Croatia.

== Design work ==
Martin's work has received varied reception. In 2005, the Daily Telegraph called the Fiat 130 Coupé a "majestic blend of severity and grace, boldness and subtlety, sharp angles joined by soft curves, a true catwalk beauty, a masterclass that was widely copied in the Seventies but never equaled."

After its debut at the 1970 Geneva Motor Show, the Ferrari Modulo went on to be shown (repainted white, from its original black) at the 1970 Turin Motor Show and at Osaka's Expo '70, before winning 22 international design awards. A 2007 retrospective said the Modulo was "a milestone in the automobile design history with a deep influence on the 1970′s car styling." In 2008, Car Design News called the Modulo "iconic". The Modulo placed third in Jalopnik's 2008 competition for the top ten best "Wedge Car Designs Of The 60s, 70s and 80s."

By contrast, the Rolls Royce Camargue ranked in 2010 as one of the "10 Worst Cars" as chosen by readers of The Globe and Mail; ranked 38 in the 2005 book Crap Cars by Richard Porter (the author saying the car "looked utterly terrible)" and ranked 92 in a 2008 poll of the 100 ugliest cars of all time by readers of The Daily Telegraph. Autoblog said the Camargue had been ranked "conspicuously low on the list," adding the Camargue "really was horrid, no matter how well it sold." Responding to the Telegraph list, noted automotive journalist James May said the Camargue "is not ugly, either. It has presence, like that pug-faced but well-dressed bloke down the pub."

=== Series production designs ===
Martin's design work that has seen series production includes:

- Triumph Spitfire (with Giovanni Michelotti)
- Fiat 130 Coupé
- Rolls-Royce Camargue
- Peugeot 104
- Lancia Beta Montecarlo
- Stutz IV-Porte and Royale

=== Concept designs ===
His concept design work has included:

- Dino Berlinetta Competizione (1967)
- BMC 1800 Aerodinamica (1967)
- Fiat Dino Parigi (1967)
- BLMC 1100 Aerodinamica (1968)
- Bentley T1 Pininfarina Coupé Speciale (1968)
- Alfa Romeo P33 Roadster (1968, later rebodied),
- Fiat Dino Ginevra (1968)
- Fiat 128 Teenager (1969)
- Ferrari Sigma (1969)
- Ferrari Modulo (1970)
- Alfa Romeo P33 Cuneo (1971)
- NSU Ro 80 "2 porte +2" (1971)
- Ford Fiesta Blue Car (1972, Ghia)
- Fiat Gobi (1984, Maggiora)
- Lotus Eminence (1980)
- Fiat Halley (1985, Maggiora)
- Nissan Hurricane Li-Ion (1986)
- Fiat Freely Savio (1987, Carrozzeria Savio)
- Fiat Topolino Concept (2008, for Ruoteclassiche Italian magazine)
- Citroen 2CV Concept (2008).
