= Ferrari Sigma =

1969 Formula One show car

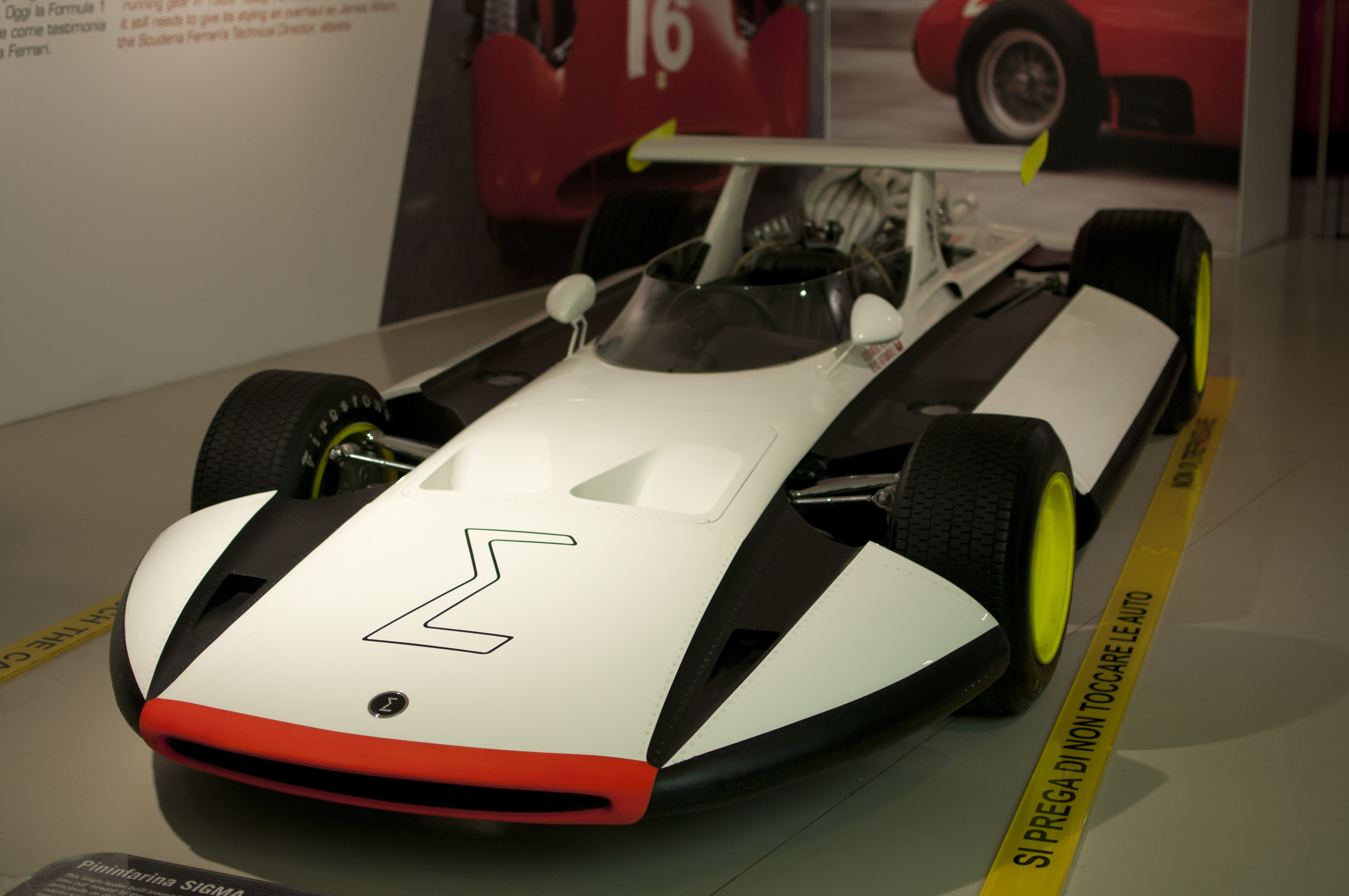
- Category: Formula One
- Constructor: Pininfarina
- Designer: Paolo Martin at Pininfarina

Technical specifications
- Chassis: Aluminium monocoque
- Suspension (front): Double wishbones, inboard springs/dampers
- Suspension (rear): As front
- Engine: Ferrari 255C 3.0 V12
- Transmission: Ferrari 5-speed manual
- Fuel: Shell
- Tyres: Firestone

Competition history
- Notable entrants: Scuderia Ferrari
- Notable drivers: (Belgium) Paul Frère
Races	Wins	Poles	F/Laps
0	0	0	0
- Constructors' Championships: 0
- Drivers' Championships: 0
- Unless otherwise stated, all data refer to Formula One World Championship Grands Prix only.

The Ferrari Sigma, also known as the Ferrari Sigma Grand Prix or Pininfarina Sigma, was a Formula One show car built in 1969 by Pininfarina.

== Specification ==
The Sigma, unveiled on 13 March 1969 in Geneva, was a prototype that was never intended to compete in any Formula One races. The main inspiration for creating the car was the high number of fatalities among Formula One drivers due to low safety standards. The Sigma was built in 1969 in cooperation by Pininfarina and Revue Automobile with the support of Enzo Ferrari, Fiat and Mercedes. The name of the car ("Sigma") was chosen because several years before Pininfarina had built an experimental safety vehicle with that name, a 1963 Pininfarina PF Sigma.

The car was designed by Paolo Martin. It was based on the Ferrari 312 and weighed 590 kilograms (1,300 lb). It was equipped with a 3.0 litre V12 engine with 436 horsepower (325 kW). This car was to be a "future car", showing mainly new safety standards. There were many innovations in it, such as a driver survival cell, multi-layer fuel tanks, a fire extinguisher system, plastic fuel-tanks, a safety-belt-system and sidepods protruding behind the rear wheels to prevent interlocking wheels.

The original car is owned by Pininfarina.
