= Fiat 130 =

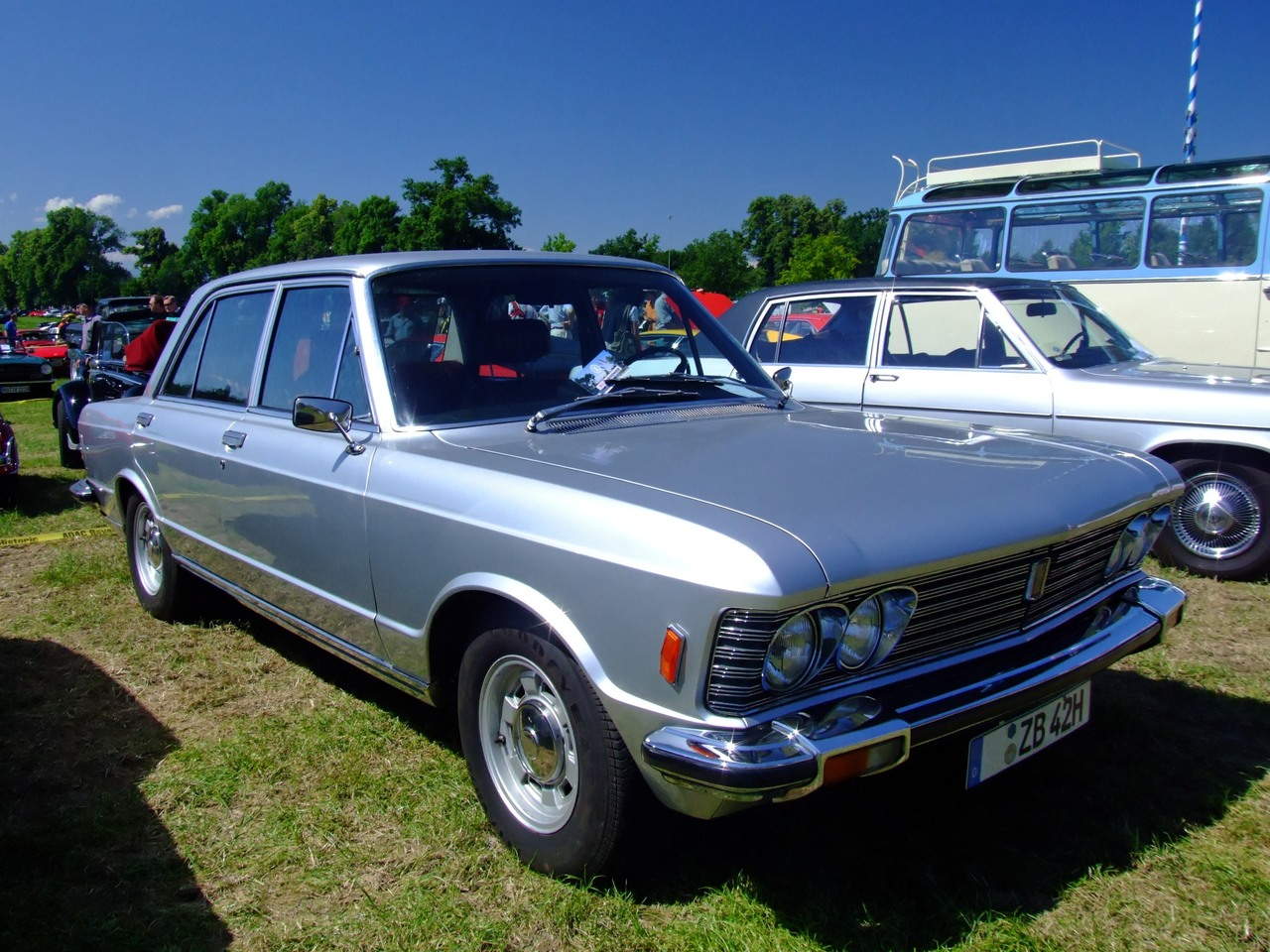
- 1976 Fiat 130 saloon

Overview
- Manufacturer: Fiat
- Production: 1969–1977
- Designer: Gian Paolo Boano (saloon); Paolo Martin at Pininfarina (Coupé)

Body and chassis
- Class: Executive car
- Body style: 4-door saloon 2-door coupé
- Layout: Front-engine, rear-wheel-drive

Powertrain
- Engine: petrol: 2.8 L 130 tipo A V6; 3.2 L 130 tipo B V6
- Transmission: 5-speed manual 3-speed automatic

Dimensions
- Wheelbase: 2,720 mm (107.1 in)
- Length: 4,750 mm (187.0 in)
- Width: 1,803 mm (71.0 in)
- Height: 1,473 mm (58.0 in)
- Kerb weight: 1,550 kg (3,417 lb)

Chronology
- Predecessor: Fiat 2300
- Successor: Fiat Argenta

The Fiat 130 is a large executive car which was produced by Italian car manufacturer Fiat from 1969 to 1977. It was available as a 4-door saloon and as a 2-door coupé. It has a V6 engine which is mounted in the front and drives the rear wheels.

== History ==
The saloon was launched at the 39th Geneva Motor Show in March 1969, replacing the previous largest and most exclusive Fiat saloon, the Fiat 2300. It was a thoroughly modern car, with four-wheel independent suspension (modified MacPherson struts front and rear, with torsion bars in the front and coil springs in the rear).

The Coupé, based on the same platform, was introduced in March 1971 having been designed by Paolo Martin of Pininfarina, who also manufactured the car. With a unique interior design (adopted in the saloon when it was upgraded to the 130B version which also featured the Coupé's enlarged 3.2-litre V6), it featured a button-operated mechanism allowing the driver to open the passenger-side door. In addition to this model, there were two one-off variations built, a three-door estate named Maremma and a four-door saloon named Opera.

Production of the saloon ended in 1976 with no direct replacement, and with 15,093 produced (including 4 Familiares, station wagon/estate versions converted by Officine Introzzo of Como). The Coupé continued until the following year, and 4,294 were built in total.

== Specifications ==
=== Engine and transmission ===
Using the "128 type A" motor as a basis, Fiat engineer and former Ferrari engine designer Aurelio Lampredi designed a new 60° V6 engine with a belt-driven valve train comprising a single overhead camshaft per cylinder bank, and two valves per cylinder. It became known as the "130 type A" engine with a capacity of 2,866 cc and a power output of 140 PS (103 kW; 138 hp) at 5,600 rpm.

The 2.8-litre engine was uprated to 160 PS (118 kW; 158 hp) for 1970, which involved raising the compression ratio from 8.3:1 to 9.0:1, increasing the size of the carburettor choke from 42 to 45 mm and reducing back pressure by extending the portion of the exhaust manifold that used individual pipes on each side of the V format engine. This provided useful performance improvements in a market-segment where relatively new models like the Mercedes-Benz W114 and Jaguar XJ6 were setting an increasingly competitive pace.

In 1971, the "130 type B" engine was introduced, featuring a cylinder bore increased to 102 mm from 96 mm, displacement of 3,235 cc, and an output of 165 PS (121 kW; 163 hp) at 5,600 rpm.

Power was delivered to the rear axle via standard Borg-Warner three-speed automatic transmission, and a five-speed ZF S5-18/3 ZF manual was an option.

=== Suspension ===
Front suspension was a modified MacPherson strut, with longitudinal torsion bars acting at base of the control arms instead of coil springs on the struts, to allow room for the wide V6 and the optional air conditioning. The height of the front suspension is adjustable, using eccentric cams in the ends of the torsion bars, where they are attached to the body.

The rear suspension is a modified Chapman strut, using nearly trailing arms carrying the coil springs, axle shafts as lateral control links, and toe control links, with good wheel geometry control. Axle shafts are connected by universal joints at both the hubs and the limited-slip differential. The rear suspension geometry can be finely tuned.

=== Steering ===
The 130 had ZF power steering. The steering column was adjustable for rake and reach.

== Models ==
=== Fiat 130 Saloon type "A" ===
Launched in 1969, with the 2866 cc 140 bhp (104 kW; 142 PS) engine. The press soon concluded that the 140 bhp (104 kW; 142 PS) was insufficient in view of the weight of 1,510 kg (3,329 lb), hence the Fiat 130 berlina type "A" did not compete with the big BMW and Mercedes sedans. Interior design was not ambitious, with rectangular dials in the dashboard, a black plastic centre console and black plastic everywhere.

=== Fiat 130 Coupé ===
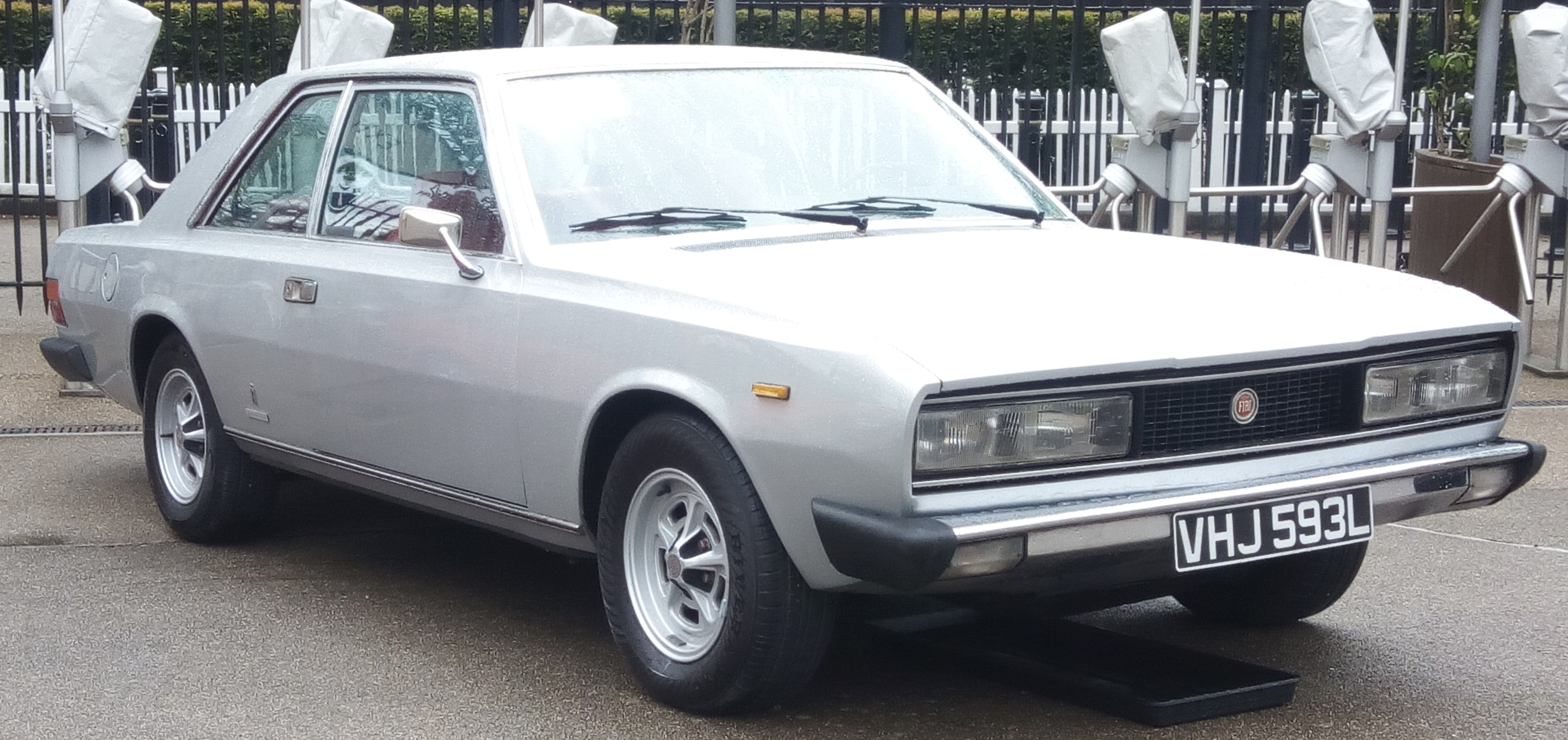
Fiat 130 Coupé

Identified as type "BC" on their chassis, the 130 Coupé appeared in 1971 at Geneva motor show exhibiting a completely new 2-door body and a completely new interior. Both exterior and interior styling were designed by Paolo Martin at Pininfarina. The car won a design prize, attributed to Pininfarina, and this helped Pininfarina begin a new life after years relying on the "Fiat 1800/Peugeot 404/Austin A60" concepts. Pininfarina unsuccessfully proposed following the Fiat 130 Coupé proposals with the Maremma in 1974 (2-door shooting brake) and the Opera in 1975 (4-door saloon). Paolo Martin was not involved in these Fiat 130 Coupé variations, as he left the company soon after the design prize in 1971.

The seats were shaped and designed by Paolo Martin with the collaboration of Giovanni Gottin, a specialist established in Turin. The dashboard was redesigned with round dials with white needles. The central console was redesigned by Paolo Martin, featuring wooden veneer, a row of switches and soft illumination throughout using state of the art fibre optics. The steering column is adjustable for rake and reach. The driver's seat has a degree of height adjustment. An original and gallant element was the option to open the passenger door from the driver's seat by pulling a lever just underneath the dashboard, next to the middle console.

Fiat 130 Coupé production figures*
1971	1972	1973	1974	1975	1976	1977	Totals
347	1,746	1,344	617	197	221	19	4,491

*stated by Pininfarina production records

=== Fiat 130 Saloon type "B" ===
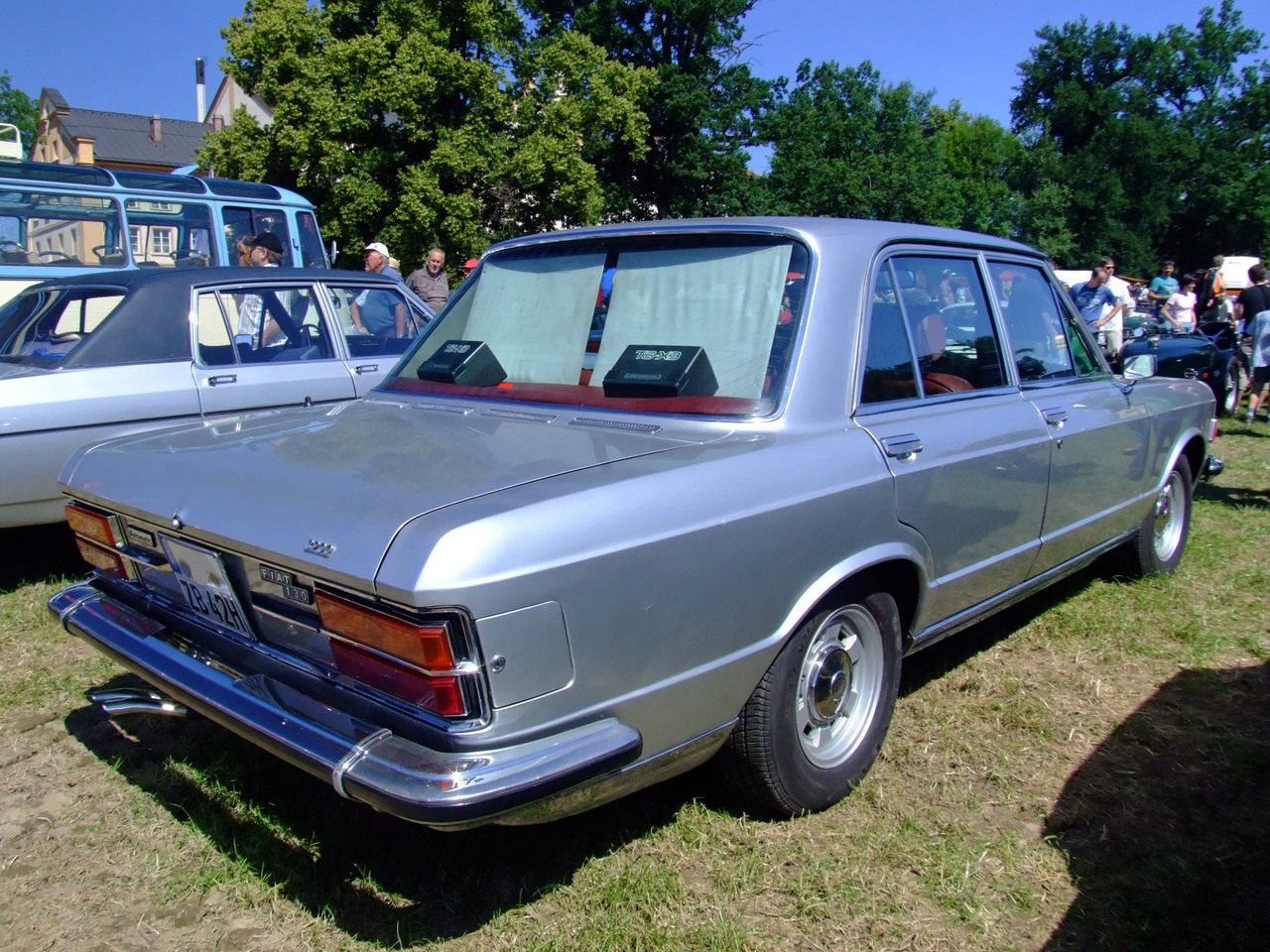
1976 Fiat 130 saloon (rear view)

These cars were improved in 1971, taking on board some Paolo Martin innovations conceived for the Coupé. The steering column, the dashboard, the central console and the ventilation are identical to the Coupé. The seats, the steering wheel and the door panels were improved, but differently from the Coupé. One can say the 1971 "B" version from 1971 is significantly more refined than the "A" version dating from 1969. Retrospectively, if one compares the 130 with big BMW and Mercedes sedans, the Fiat 130 Berlina type "B" may be the winner in terms of interior design and some comfort elements. But if one is considering the dynamic elements like power and ride comfort, the Fiat 130 type "B" is still lagging as the engine is not blessed with fuel injection (somewhat difficult to start—depending on the conditions), the engine does not have hydraulic self-adjusting valves, and the engine is simply not powerful enough. All this combines with a worryingly high fuel consumption. And this lack of dash and lack of efficiency are not compensated for with an extra smooth ride.

=== Fiat 130 Familiare ===
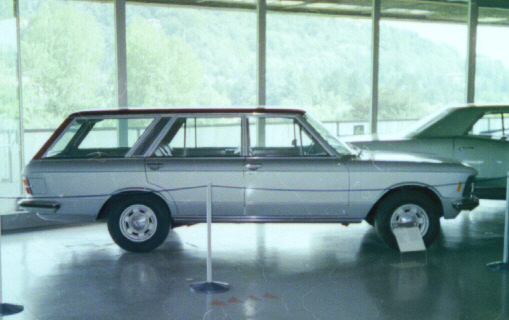
Fiat 130 Familiare by Introzzi

The Agnellis charged Officina Introzzi of Lake Como with building an estate version of the 130 saloon, called the 130 Familiare. The design was executed by Fiat Design Centre, while Introzzi built the cars. Four were built, exclusively for the Agnelli family and their friends. The first car, fitted with wood panelling and a roof rack including a wicker basket, was Gianni Agnelli's personal car and is called the Fiat 130 Villa d'Este - a name later used by Introzzi on other luxuriously appointed Fiats, including the Ritmo and Panda.

== Critical appraisal ==
British Motor magazine reviewed the 130 and decided that the car's strong points were excellent handling and road-holding, smooth ride, very high standard of interior and comfort plus an enormous boot. Against the car were its noisy engine, heavy fuel consumption and price. Motor described its cornering power as very high. The UK's Autocar tested the car and described it as "a dignified Italian". The overall verdict from Autocar was similar to that of Motor, but they added that the brakes were spongy [and] road noise was obtrusive, though to its credit the car was very well appointed and finished and had first-class visibility. Concerning the handling, the road-testers went on to write that "seldom have we encountered such excellent handling in a car of this size. Its superbly balanced feel inspires tremendous confidence, allowing high averages to be achieved without conscious driver effort". Under a review of the coupé version of the 130, Car described the engine as providing a comfortable level of overall performance with good intermediate range torque. According to Car the saloon had a less-controlled ride than the coupé and less positive handling, the hard-driven saloon getting "more wallowy at times"
