= Emanuele Nicosia =

Italian automobile designer

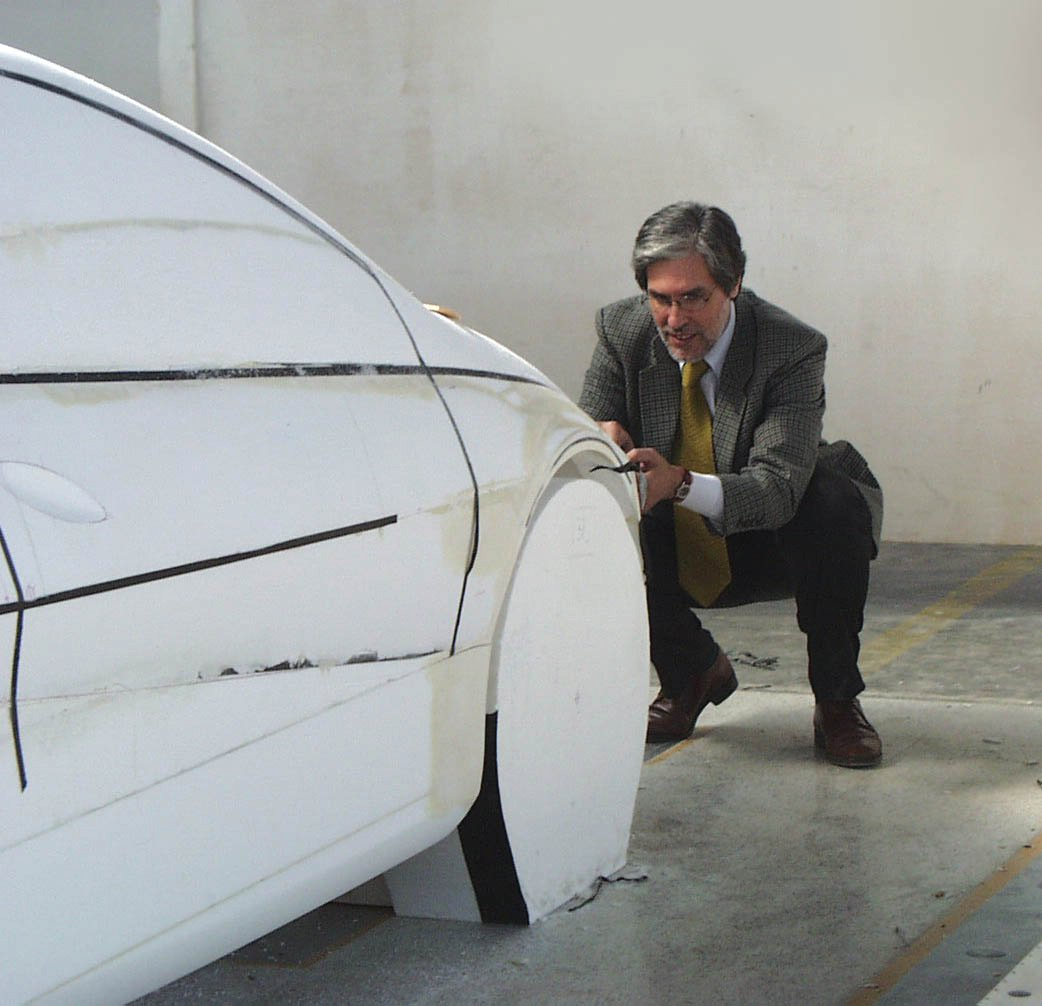
Emanuele Nicosia

Emanuele Nicosia (11 January 1953 – 23 March 2016) was an automobile designer from Italy. He worked at Pininfarina for many years, designing the Jaguar XJ Spider concept in 1979 and working on the Ferrari 288 GTO and Testarossa. Later, he worked on the interior design of the Lamborghini Diablo and Bugatti EB110.

Nicosia also worked on motorbike projects, and has collaborated with Mauro Forghieri, then of the Oral Engineering Group, designing racing motorbikes. In 2000 he developed a concept for a SUB (Sport Utility Bike) based on a Moto Guzzi 750 engine which was introduced at 2000 Bologna Motor Show.

He was head of Automotive Program at DYPDC Center for Automotive Research and Studies, started running his Beestudio design branch office in Pune, India. He went to RCA, London for specializing in design.

== Biographical news ==
After finishing high school, he enrolled in the faculty of engineering in Catania in 1972 and then went on to the Royal College of Art in London. After graduation and a subsequent master's degree, in 1977, he began working at the Pininfarina Research Center in Grugliasco(TO). During this period he collaborated on the creation of several cars, such as the Ferrari 288 GTO and the Ferrari Testarossa. His was the design of the Jaguar XJS prototype for the Birmingham show in 1978.

In 1980 he moved to Carrozzeria Ghia for a year, where he collaborated on the line design of the Ford Taurus, among other things, before returning to Pininfarina where he developed countless projects from trucks for Iveco to speedboats and buses. He remained at Pininfarina until 1985, when he began his independent business. He founded Design System together with his partner Graziano Pagliasso, who was in charge of the model and prototype department, combining the professionalism of the designer with the manual dexterity of the model maker, resulting in projects that were fundamental to him, such as the interiors of the Lamborghini Diablo.

In 1989 he developed an important project for the production of a car for the jeweler Gianni Bulgari. In 1990 he left Design System to found, together with Anna Visconti, the design studio Beestudio, with the aim of bringing the experiences of both designers together in a single design studio in the city of Turin, the nerve center of automotive design. Numerous projects by the two designers have come to fruition: from the interiors of railway cars made for the German market in collaboration with OFV, to car bodies designed for clients in Japan and Germany such as Nissan, Mazda, Honda and Dahiatsu, including the Cypact model, air conditioners produced by Rex, lighting fixtures made for Martini Illuminazione, Ilti Luce and Buzzi & Buzzi, self-service payment totems designed for Bassilichi and Olivetti, to name a few. In fact, for Bassilichi, Visconti and Nicosia designed the Base B Omnia self-service payment, which is present in all hospitals and ASLs for health ticket payments. In both automotive and product design-where both have gained extensive experience over the years-they create realized prototypes that will bring numerous innovations, both technical and design, to the design field. After many years, the collaboration between the two designers evolves through the creation of the first network dedicated entirely to design: the Design Service Network (DSN) based in Le Locle, Switzerland. Beestudio with Anna Visconti and DSN with Emanuele Nicosia create a large team of professionals that incorporates, among others, Mauro Forghieri's Oral Engineering, Wako's White House, and Catania's Biomechanics Research. This collaboration will lead to the birth of the two most important prototypes among the two designers' creations: the car model ‘Thesi Uno,’ a 1:1 scale conceptual prototype with modular chassis designed in collaboration with Oral Engineering of Mauro Forghieri and presented at the Motor Show in 2000 and the working prototype of super-scooter ‘Sansone,’ made on Moto Guzzi mechanics, fully functional and innovative, presented to the public during the Motorshow in 2000.

Among his other collaborations, both with Beestudio and DSN, it is worth mentioning those with Nissan, Lotus Cars, Mazda, and Honda. He has also designed the interiors of high-performance sports cars such as the Bugatti EB110 and Lamborghini Diablo.

In 2010 he began a collaboration with DYPDC in the city of Pune,India establishing a Beestudio branch in Pune. The collaboration with Italy, through the parent company Beestudio in Turin, Italy, allows Nicosia and Visconti to greatly expand their experience in new environments related to both automotive and product design.
