= Koenig Specials =

German tuning house based in Munich

- Type: Gesellschaft mit beschränkter Haftung
- Industry: Automotive
- Founded: 1977 in Munich, Germany
- Founder: Willy König
- Headquarters: Munich, Germany
- Key people: Walter König; Oliver König
- Brands: Koenig
- Website: koenig-specials.com

Koenig Specials GmbH (known widely as Koenig) is a German tuning house based in Munich that specialised in modifications to European luxury cars but gained notability in the 1980s and 1990s for their performance modifications to Ferraris. Some of its most notable works included a twin-turbo Ferrari Testarossa with extensive body modifications that made it resemble a Ferrari F40 (known as the Koenig Competition and in revised form Koenig Competition Evolution) that produced up to a claimed 1,000 PS DIN in "Evolution" guise, a highly unusual output for cars at the time, as well as the 850 PS DIN Ferrari F50. Koenig also entered into automobile production with its road-going version of the Porsche 962 known as the Koenig C62, therefore becoming the first road-legal Group C-based car.

Many of its cars have been featured in non-German mainstream publications such as Road & Track, Top Gear, and Sports Car International. Car magazine described its Competition Evolution as "the most famous modified supercar of the 1980s".

== History ==
=== The founder Willy König ===
Willy König, often spelt as Willy Koenig by non-Germans, was born on February 2, 1938. He originally became wealthy from publishing, and was able to afford race cars to race. He began his racing career in 1961 with a Formula Junior Cooper that he acquired from the Formula One driver Wolfgang von Trips.

One of his early motorsport achievements included winning the Deutsche Bergmeisterschaft (German Hillclimbing Championship) in 1962 with a Ferrari 250 GT SWB Berlinetta under the pseudonym Robert Frank. As a result, he was invited personally by Enzo Ferrari to an event held in his honour at Maranello. Up until the end of the decade, König raced a variety of cars including the Lola T70, various Fiat Abarths, Borgward Isabella TS, and Ford GT40. He retired from professional racing after 1969 to devote more time to his business; he then raced occasionally in club meetings and later sold his printing business to focus on his thriving car tuning business.

In the late 1980s, he raced the BMW 320i Turbo and the BMW M1 Procar with his son, Walter. As well, he won the domestic Spezial-Tourenwagen-Trophy in 1990 with his Porsche 935 K3 and competed in the Interserie with a Porsche 962. He additionally survived a 250 km/h crash at the Rindt Kurve during a test drive at the Österreichring in his 935 K3.

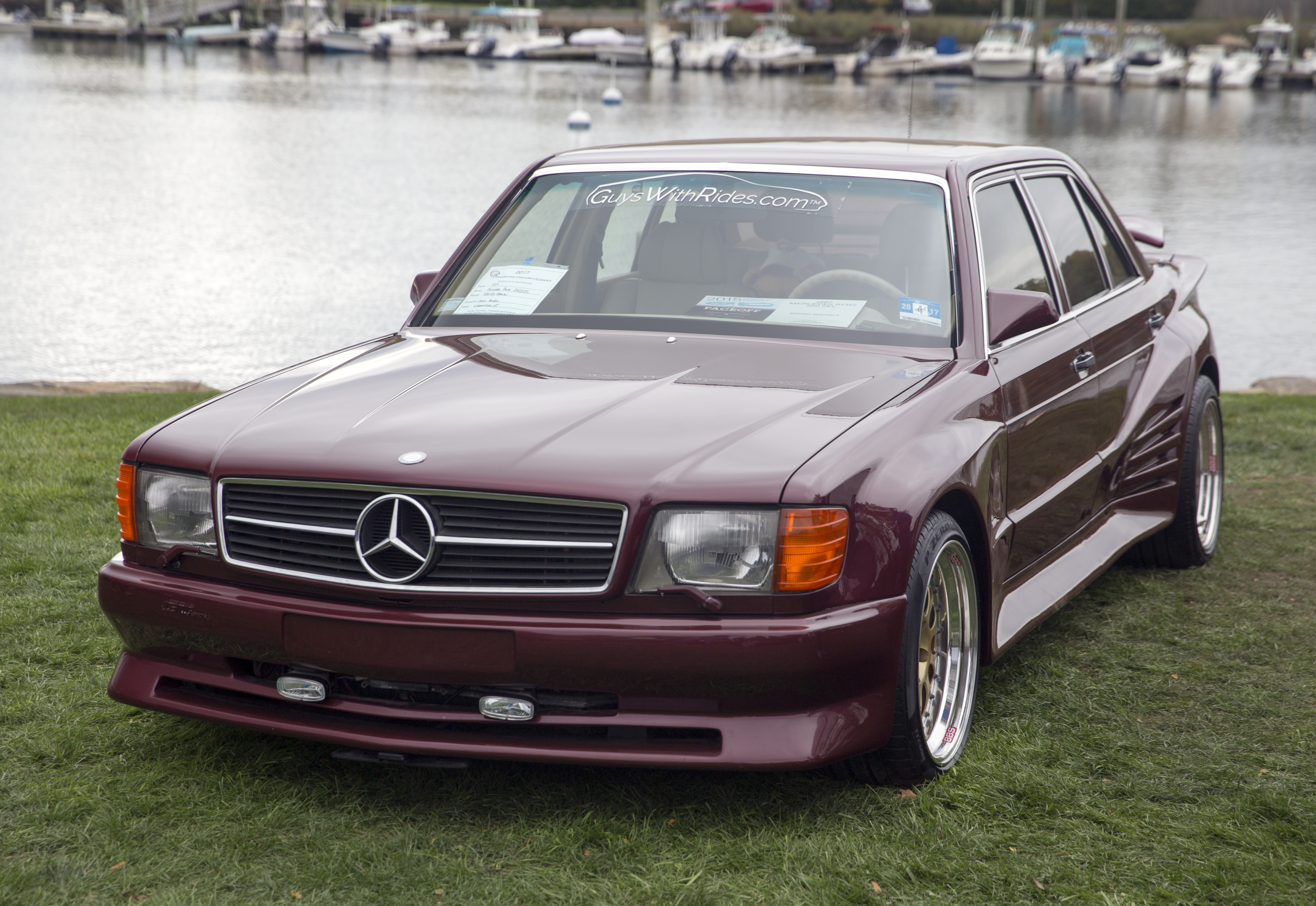
Koenig Specials Mercedes-Benz 560SEL

== 1977, the company ==
The foundation of Koenig Specials began in 1974 when Willy König bought one of the first Ferrari 365 GT4 BBs in West Germany, but was dissatisfied with its performance in comparison to the sports car racers he was accustomed to. His work eventually became so popular that when he attended Ferrari events, he was commissioned by other owners to carry out similar work for them once they learned that his car had been modified. His work initially began with addition of factory parts or parts copied from other racing cars, such as rear spoilers, wide wheels, three-plate clutches, and high performance exhausts.

Koenig's hobby grew, and it eventually became a business in 1977 with an aim to make Ferrari a "proper sportscars [sic] again". One of the early modifications offered consisted of a spoiler with crudely tacked on rear wheel arch extensions The company was named Koenig because there was a large German Ferrari dealer known as Konig (Auto-König), in addition to avoiding Anglicization of the name.

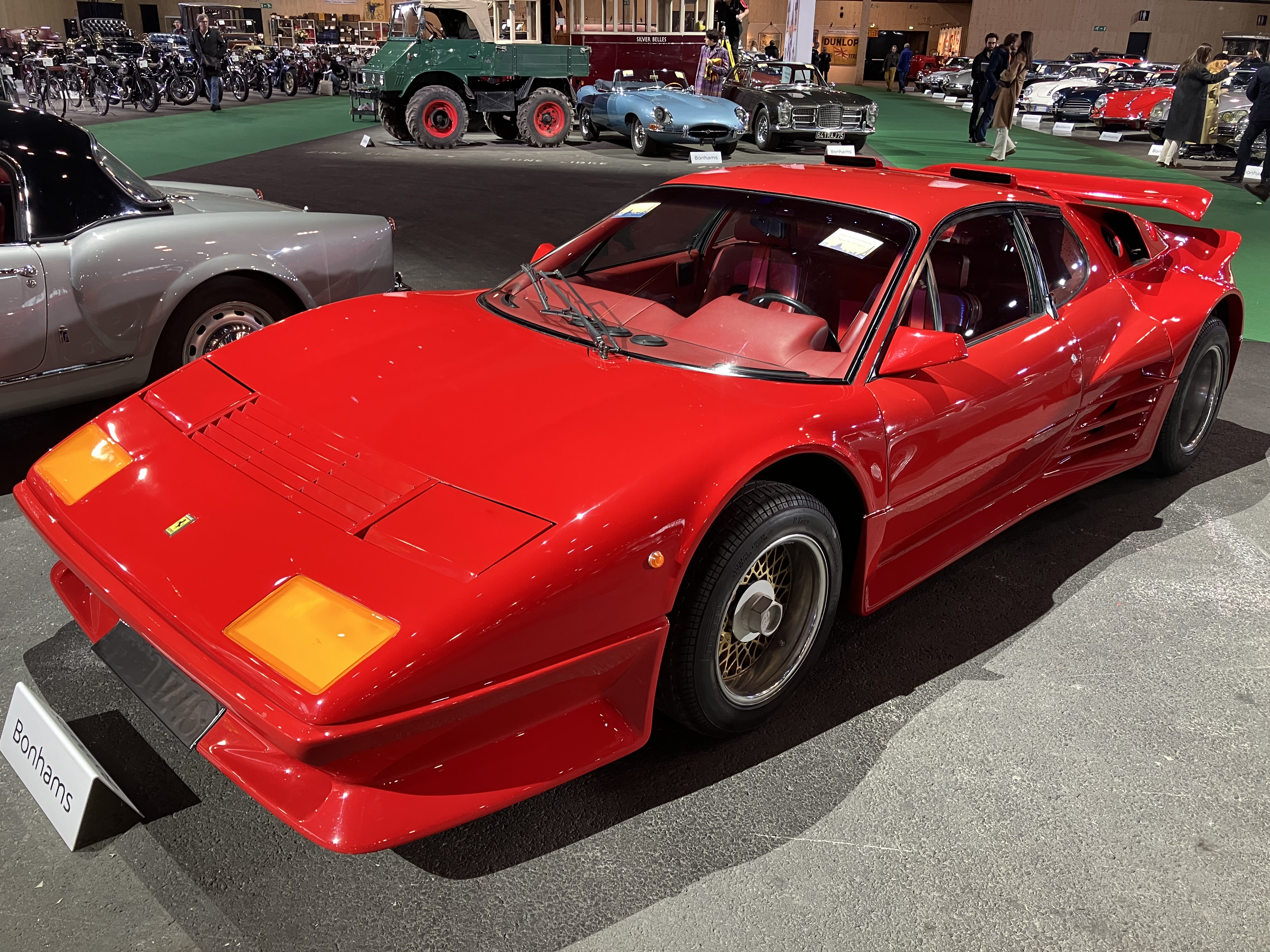

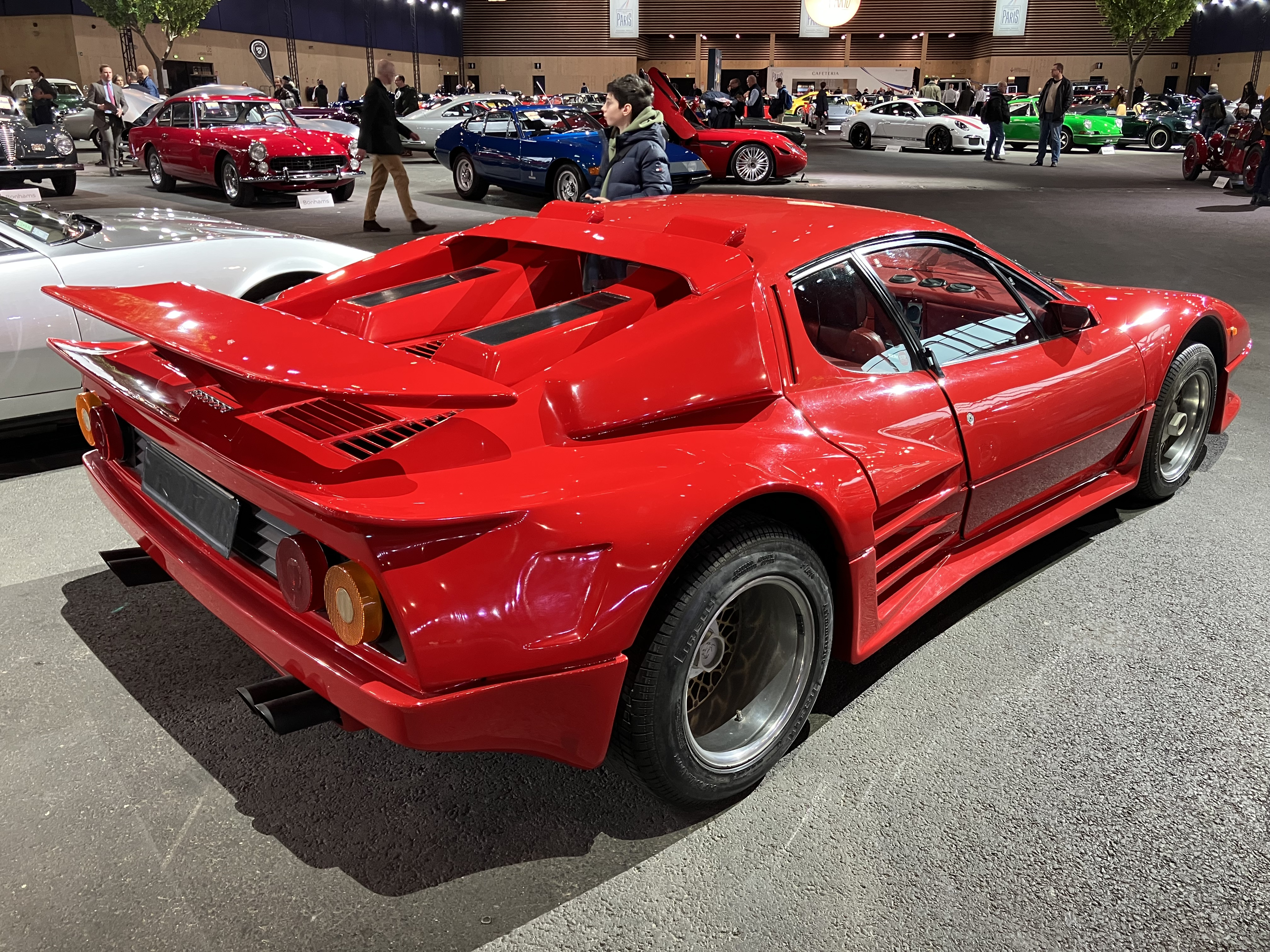
1977 Ferrari 512 BB Koenig-Specials

Additionally, he offered three different options for the Ferrari 365/512 BB, a high performance exhaust that produced a quoted 370 bhp; the addition of a high performance exhaust camshaft producing 400 bhp and a quoted 450 bhp for special pistons, modified cylinder heads, and rejetted carburetors, which was good for 4.5 seconds from 0–60 mph. If this wasn't enough for the owner, Koenig offered a twin-turbo conversion that consisted of a pair of Rajay turbos and intercoolers, which produced a total of 620 bhp. The 365/512 BB required a modified suspension and 9" front/13"rear wheels with uprated brakes to handle the power. With a large spoiler and every body panel (with the exception of the roof and upper front bodywork) replaced, the car was able to reach a claimed 0–60 mph in 3.9 seconds and a top speed of 206 miles per hour (332 km/h).

As well, Koenig also offered heavy duty fiberglass wide bodykits, which was popular for cars of the time. Perhaps Koenig's most notable project was their work on the successor of the 512 BB, a modified version of the Ferrari Testarossa that debuted in the 1985 Frankfurt Motor Show. It produced 710 bhp, 320 bhp over a stock Testarossa. This was followed up by the 800 bhp Competition (1988) that was good for 217 miles per hour (349 km/h); its convertible version, the Competition Cabrio (1989), although being less powerful, was good for 198 miles per hour (319 km/h). As Ferrari never offered a convertible because of the required significant amount of strengthening in the chassis required to make up for the lack of upper structure, the conversion cost US$55,600 (equivalent to $144,411 in 2025) alone. For those who wanted extra power, there was the Competition Evolution quoted at 1000 PS DIN, claiming a top speed of 230 miles per hour (370 km/h) and an estimated 0 to 60 mph in 3.5 seconds. Koenig would also re-trim the interior to suit the client's specifications. The car's overall cost, including car with fully re-trimmed leather interior and a 1000w 16-speaker Kenwood audio system was reported to be US$595,900 (equivalent to $1,468,500 in 2025).

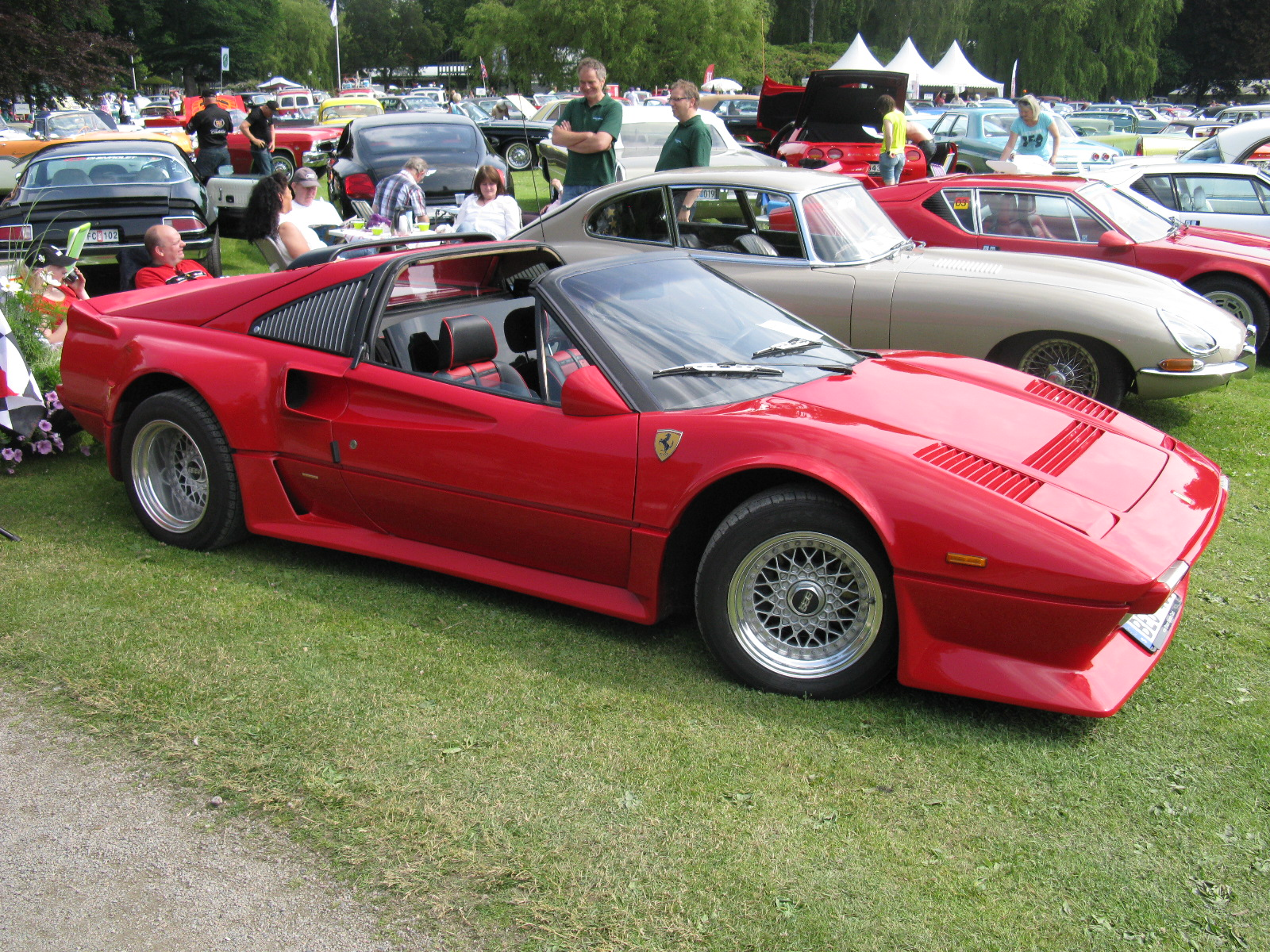
Koenig Specials Ferrari 308 GTS

Some of its other notable modifications included a Ferrari F40 capable of producing 750 bhp, a single turbo 400 bhp Ferrari 308, a twin-turbo 850 bhp F50, and a Porsche 911 with headlights and taillights from a 928 and Audi 200, respectively.

Koenig's regular collaborators included engine tuner Franz Albert and Vittorio Strosek, who specialised in widebody kits. Its other outside collaborators included H&R (suspension) and later in the 1980s, OZ (wheels).

The company additionally branched out into offering kits or full conversions for other makes of vehicles, such as Mercedes-Benz, Jaguar, Porsche and Lamborghini.

The company branched out into car production with a replica of the Porsche 962, as a result, it became the first road-legal Group C/IMSA GTP type car.

== The Koenig F48 ==
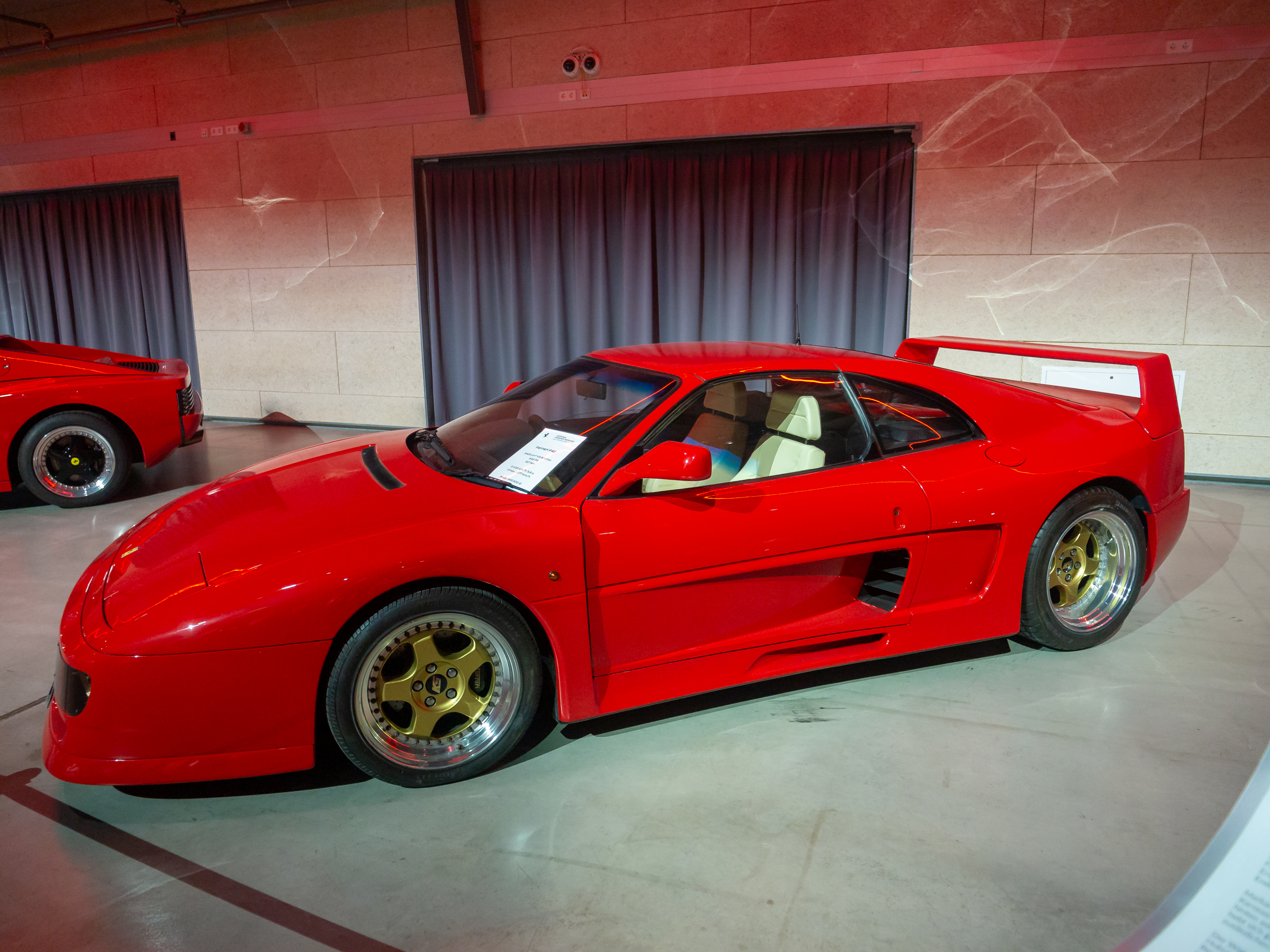
Koenig F48

A complete rework of the Ferrari 348 was offered which included twin turbos and a full widebody conversion with a wing similar to that seen on the F40 (hence "F48"). The KS600 package led to the 348 having almost 600bhp.

Fewer than 10 versions of the F48 were made making this model very rare and it is estimated that three are right hand drive. Official F48 conversions (like all other Koenigs) will have a Koenig Specials VIN plate on the dashboard starting with “KS”.

== Reputation ==
The business thrived as it was supported by the strong German economy of the 1970s and 1980s.

Koenig, as one of the first tuning houses to specialize in expensive exotic cars, represented an era of independent German tuning houses of the 1980s such as Brabus and Gemballa that began to replace traditional coachbuilders of the previous generations.

By the end of the 1990s, some of those companies were slowly killed off by the recession and some that survived went for a conservative body modification route. At the same time, tuner houses were replaced by in-house tuners and customization schemes such as BMW M and Mercedes-AMG.

Koenig's reputation grew so much that it divided the opinion of Ferrari fans, disagreeing on even the removal of the side strakes on the modified cars. Additionally, Koenig also angered Enzo Ferrari so much that he ordered Koenig, via legal notice, to remove all prancing horse badging from its cars once it received the modifications, as they no longer considered it to be a Ferrari. Magazines took lengths to avoid visual reference to the Italian marque when running a feature on a Koenig car. For example Top Gear magazine had to mask the badge of an owner's F50 to avoid legal action, and a car tested by Road & Track had an alternative rectangular KS badge in yellow background in place of the prancing horse badge in front.

In addition, Koenig modified cars owned by celebrities. These include actor Sylvester Stallone, who had a silver Mercedes-Benz 560SEC and Formula One driver Gerhard Berger, who had a 650ps twin-turbo Testarossa.

An article in Sports Car International claimed that they were (likely) to spark the widebody conversion trend of the 1980s, additionally they were described by Auto Bild as "Germany's wildest tuner". Road & Track regarded Koenig in one of its issues as "one of Germany's leading tuners".

Chris Chilton, editor of Car, included two Koenig cars in a top ten list of "German Mod Crimes of the '80s", but noted that the Competition Evolution, along with the Ruf Yellowbird, were "probably the most famous modified supercar of the 1980s".

Although a shadow of its former self, the company continues to exist, producing components but no longer producing complete cars or full conversion packages.
