= Ferrari Testarossa =

12-cylinder mid-engine sports car manufactured by Ferrari

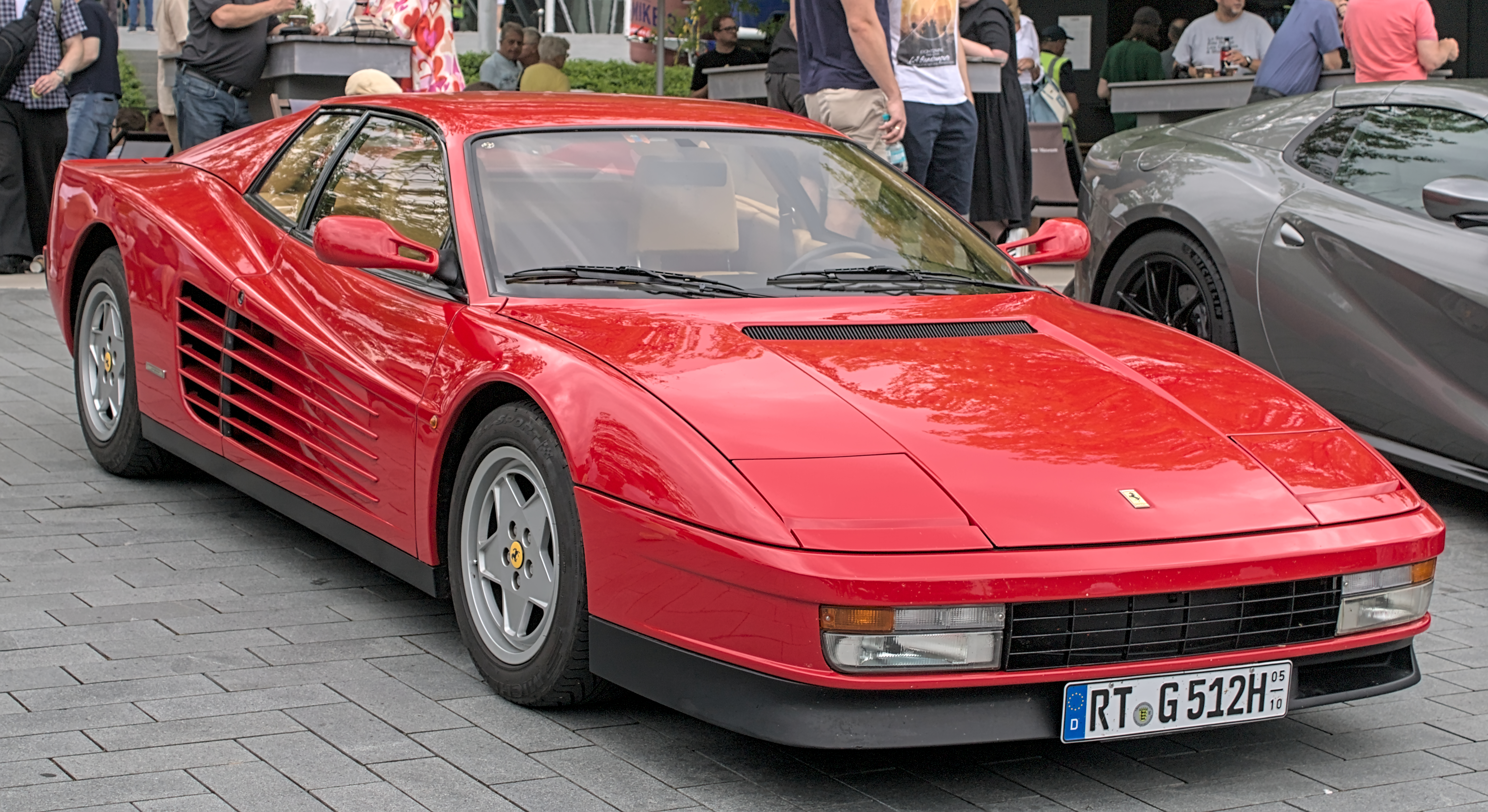

Overview
- Manufacturer: Ferrari
- Production: 1984–1996; 9,939 produced
- Assembly: Italy: Maranello
- Designer: Diego Ottina, Leonardo Fioravanti, Ian Cameron, Guido Campoli, Emanuele Nicosia at Pininfarina (Testarossa); Pietro Camardella at Pininfarina (512 TR)

Body and chassis
- Class: Sports car Grand tourer (S)
- Body style: 2-door berlinetta
- Layout: Rear mid-engine, rear-wheel-drive

Powertrain
- Engine: 4.9 L Tipo F113 flat-12
- Transmission: 5-speed manual

Chronology
- Predecessor: Ferrari 512 BBi
- Successor: Ferrari 550 Maranello

The Ferrari Testarossa (Type F110) is a 12-cylinder mid-engine sports car manufactured by Ferrari, which went into production in 1984 as the successor to the Ferrari Berlinetta Boxer. The Pininfarina-designed car was originally produced from 1984 until 1991, with two model revisions following the end of Testarossa production called the 512 TR and F512 M, which were produced from 1992 until 1996. Including revised variations, almost 10,000 cars in total were produced, making it at the time one of the most mass-produced Ferrari models.

The Testarossa is a two-door coupé that premiered at the 1984 Paris Auto Show. All versions of the Testarossa were available with a rear-mounted, five-speed manual transmission. The rear mid-engine design (engine between the axles but behind the cabin) keeps the centre of gravity in the middle of the car, which increases stability and improves the car's cornering ability, and thus results in a standing weight distribution of 40% front: 60% rear.

The original Testarossa was re-engineered for the 1992 model year and was introduced as the 512 TR (TR meaning TestaRossa), at the Los Angeles Auto Show, effectively as a completely new car, and an improved weight distribution of 41% front, 59% rear. Another new variant called the F512 M was introduced at the 1994 Paris Auto Show. The car dropped the TR initials and added the M which in Italian stood for modificata, or translated to modified, and was the final version of the Testarossa, which continued its predecessor's weight distribution improvement of 42% front, 58% rear. The F512 M was Ferrari's last vehicle that featured the flat-12 engine.

The Testarossa is a recognized cultural icon of the 1980s, and was popularized by media including the 1984 television series Miami Vice (from the 1986 season onward) and Sega's 1986 video game Out Run.

== Development ==
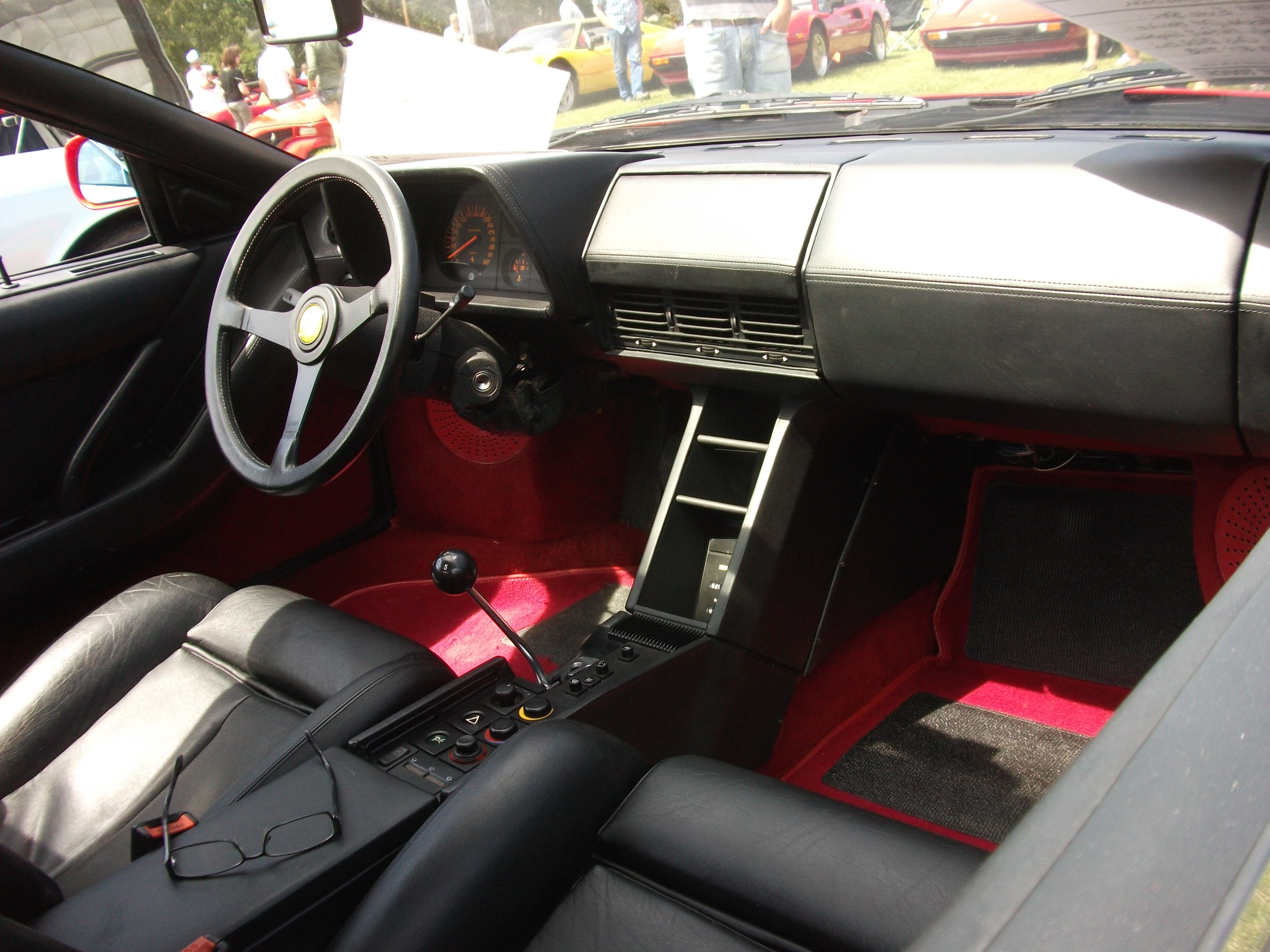
Interior

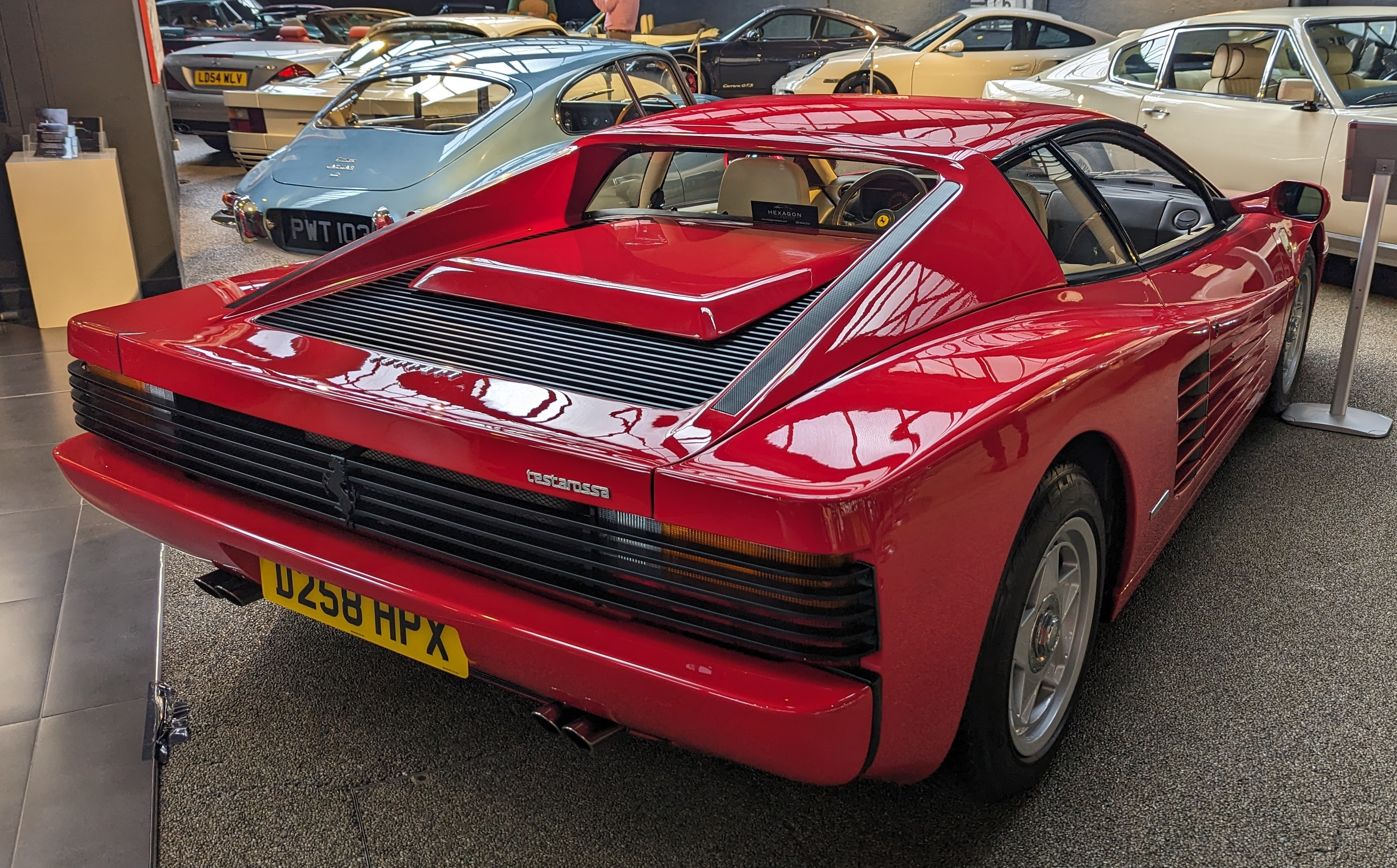
Rear view

The Testarossa traces its roots back to the faults of the 1981 512 BBi. The problems that the Testarossa was conceived to fix included a cabin that got increasingly hot from the indoor plumbing that ran between the front-mounted radiator and the midships-mounted engine and a lack of luggage space. To fix these problems the Testarossa was designed to be larger than its predecessor. For instance, at 1,976 mm (77.8 in) wide, the Testarossa was half a foot wider than the Boxer. This resulted in an increased wheelbase that stretched about 64 mm (2.5 in) to 2,550 mm (100.4 in), which was used to accommodate luggage in a carpeted storage space under the front forward-opening hood. The increase in length created extra storage space behind the seats in the cabin. Headroom was also increased with a roofline half an inch taller than the Boxer.

The design came from Pininfarina. The design team at Pininfarina consisted of Ian Cameron, Guido Campoli, Diego Ottina, and Emanuele Nicosia. They were led by design chief Leonardo Fioravanti, who also designed many other contemporary Ferrari models. The design was originated by Nicosia, but the guidance of Fioravanti was equally important. Being trained in aerodynamics, Fioravanti applied his know-how to set the layout of the car. The designers were originally trying to minimize the necessary side intakes, which also could not be left open due to American safety legislation, but then decided on making them a statement of style instead - one that ended up becoming emblematic of the late eighties. The Testarossa did not need a rear spoiler. The aerodynamic drag coefficient of Cd=0.36 was significantly lower than the Lamborghini Countach's 0.42.

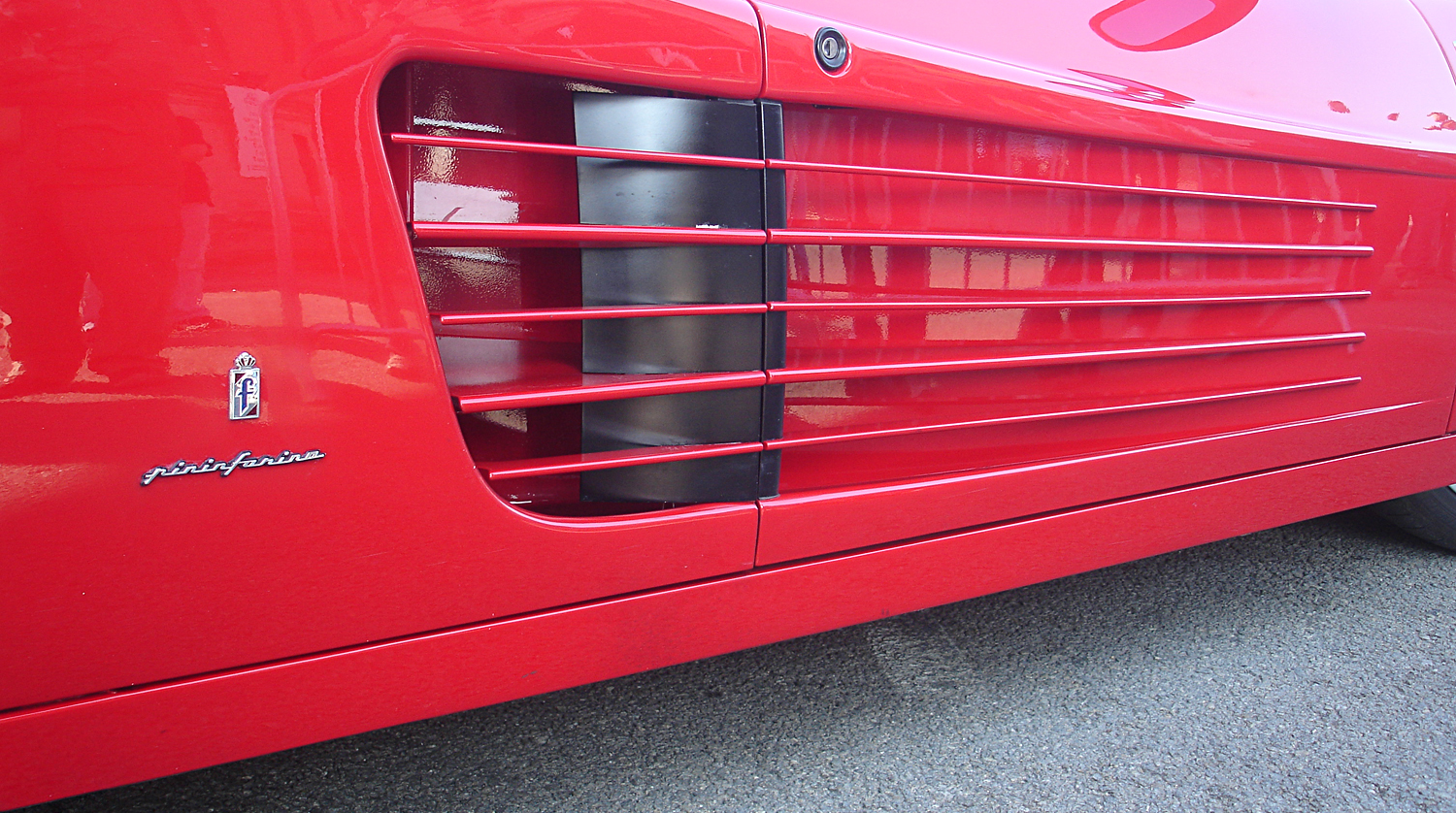
One of the side intakes on a 512 TR, which leads to the side-mounted radiators

The styling was a departure from the curvaceous boxer—one which caused some controversy. The side strakes sometimes referred to as "cheese graters" or "egg slicers," that spanned from the doors to the rear fenders were needed for rules in several countries outlawing large openings on cars. Unlike the Berlinetta Boxer, the Testarossa had twin side radiators near the engine at the rear instead of a single radiator up-front - eliminating much piping and allowing for a much cooler cabin. After passing through the engine bay, the cooling air exited through the vents at the engine lid and the tail. The strakes also made the Testarossa wider at the rear than at the front, thus increasing stability and handling.

One last unique addition to the new design was a single high mounted side view mirror on the driver's side. On US-based cars, the mirror was lowered to a more normal placement for the 1987 model year and was quickly joined by a passenger side view mirror for the driver to be able to make safe lane changes.

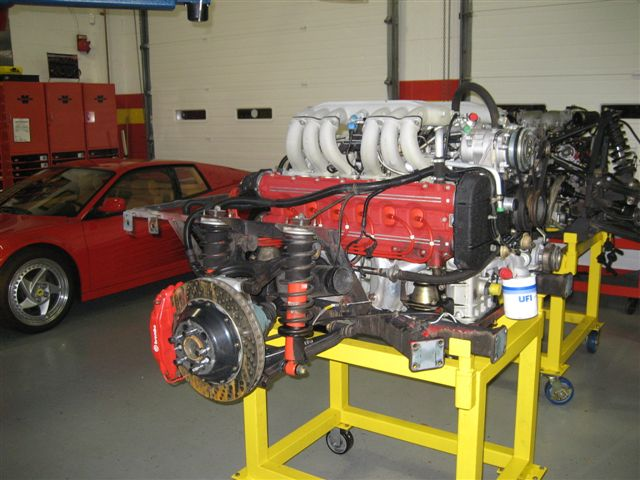
A Testarossa engine with red cam covers

The "Testarossa" name pays homage to the famed 1957 World Sportscar Championship-winning 250 Testa Rossa sports racing car. Testa Rossa, which literally means "red head" in Italian, refers to the red-painted cam covers sported by both cars' 12-cylinder engines.

Like its predecessor, the Testarossa used double wishbone front and rear suspension systems. Ferrari improved traction by adding 10-inch-wide alloy rear wheels. The Testarossa's drivetrain was also an evolution of the 512 BBi. Its engine used near identical displacement and compression ratio, but unlike the 512 BBi had four-valve cylinder heads that were finished in red.

== Testarossa ==
Testarossa
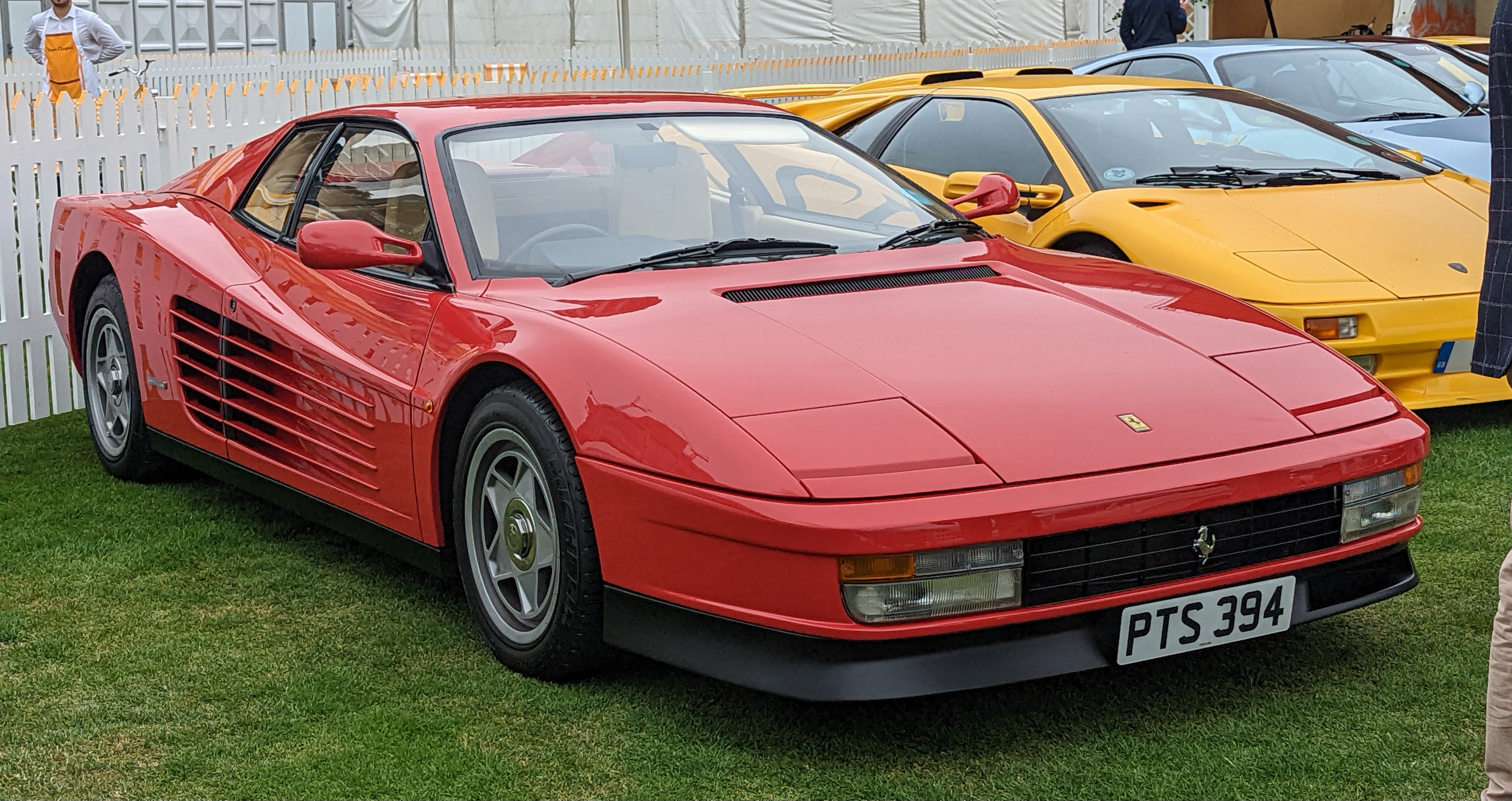

Overview
- Production: 1984–1991 (7,177 produced)

Powertrain
- Engine: 4.9 L Tipo F113 and F113 B flat-12
- Power output: 287 kW (390 PS; 385 hp)
- Transmission: 5-speed manual

Dimensions
- Wheelbase: 2,550 mm (100.4 in)
- Length: 4,485 mm (176.6 in)
- Width: 1,976 mm (77.8 in)
- Height: 1,130 mm (44.5 in)
- Kerb weight: 1,708.2 kg (3,766 lb)

=== Engine ===
The Testarossa has a naturally aspirated 4.9 L (4,943 cc) longitudinally-mounted, Tipo F113 flat-12 engine. The engine has DOHC 4 valves per cylinder (48 valves in total) and is lubricated via a dry sump system. The engine has a compression ratio of 9.30:1. These combine to provide a maximum power of 287 kW (390 PS; 385 hp) at 6,300 rpm and maximum torque of 490 N⋅m (361 lb⋅ft) at 4,500 rpm. Early U.S. versions of the car had the same engine, but had slightly less power, which stood at 283 kW (385 PS; 380 hp).

The Testarossa can accelerate from 0–100 km/h (62 mph) in 5.8 seconds and on to 161 km/h (100 mph) in 11.4 seconds (though Motor Trend Magazine managed 5.29 seconds to 60 mph and 11.3 seconds, respectively). It can complete a standing (from stationary) quarter mile ~1/4 mi (402 m) in 13.5 seconds and a standing kilometre in 23.8 seconds. The top speed of the Testarossa is estimated at 290 km/h (180 mph).

Gear	Reverse	1	2	3	4	5	Final Drive
Ratio	2.523:1	3.139:1	2.104:1	1.526:1	1.167:1	0.875:1	3.210:1

=== Engine specifications ===
Petrol engines
Model	Year(s)	Displacement	Fuel type	Power	Torque	0–100 km/h (0–62 mph)
Catalyst Europe-market	1986–1989	4,943 cc (301.6 cu in)	Petrol	370 PS (272 kW; 365 bhp)	451 N⋅m (333 ft⋅lb_{f})	5.8 s
Catalyst	1989–1991	4,943 cc (301.6 cu in)	Petrol	381 PS (280 kW; 376 bhp)	470 N⋅m (347 ft⋅lb_{f})	5.7 s
US-market	1984–1989	4,943 cc (301.6 cu in)	Petrol	385 PS (283 kW; 380 bhp)	480 N⋅m (354 ft⋅lb_{f})	6.1 s
Europe-market	1984–1989	4,943 cc (301.6 cu in)	Petrol	390 PS (287 kW; 385 bhp)	480 N⋅m (354 ft⋅lb_{f})	5.8 s

=== Wheels and suspension ===
When introduced for the 1985 model year, the Testarossa had magnesium single bolt "knockoff" wheels with a 16.33 inches (415 mm) diameter. These wheels used the Michelin TRX tyres having sizes of 240/45 VR 415 at the front and 280/45 VR 415 at the rear. The TRX cars did have the option of specifying 16" wheels and 225/50R16 and 265/50R16 Pirelli Cinturato P7 were homologated.

In the 1986 model year, the wheels kept the same design but were changed to a standard 16 inches (410 mm) diameter, with a width of 8 inches at the front and 10 inches at the rear. Goodyear Gatorback or Pirelli Cinturato P-Zero 225/50 VR 16 front tyres and 255/50 VR 16 rear tyres were fitted. However, for the US market the cars were delivered with the metric sized TRX wheels until the 1989 model year.

The rear suspension consisted of independent, unequal-length wishbones, coil springs, twin telescopic shock absorbers on each side, and an anti-roll bar. The entire drivetrain and suspension was designed to be removed as a unit from underneath the car so the engine and timing belts could be serviced.

In the mid of the 1988 model year, the suspension was redesigned and the wheels were changed again from the single bolt knockoff setup to the standard Ferrari five bolt pattern. The wheel design still resembled the ones installed at the Testarossa's debut.

The front brakes have a diameter of 309 mm (12.17 in) and the rear brakes have a diameter of 310 mm (12.20 in).

=== Reception ===
The car received a positive reception from the automotive press - it was featured on the cover of Road & Track magazine 10 times from December 1984 through July 1989. It lost comparison tests to the Lamborghini Countach, Alpina B10 Bi-Turbo and BMW M5.

Well-known Testarossa owners included Elton John, Marti Pellow, Alain Delon, O. J. Simpson, Rod Stewart, Michael Jordan, Mike Tyson, John Carmack, Dr. Dre, M.C. Hammer, Austrian Formula One racing driver Gerhard Berger, and Gary Monsieur. Don Johnson, who famously drove a white Testarossa on Miami Vice, was gifted a brand-new silver 1989 Testarossa by Enzo Ferrari himself, who was a fan of Miami Vice. Michael Mann, executive producer of the series, also had a custom painted, blue metallic Testarossa.

Although successful on the road, the Testarossa did not participate in any racing event, unlike the 512 BBi, which had done so with minor success.

As Ferrari's flagship model during the 1980s, the car made numerous appearances in pop culture, most notably in the arcade game Out Run, and in the third, fourth, and fifth seasons of Miami Vice. The car has subsequently become synonymous with 1980s "yuppies" and is an icon of 1980s retro culture. Its signature side strakes have become a popular aftermarket body component for wide arch aesthetic body kits. The side strakes also spawned body kits that were designed for cars such as the Pontiac Fiero and the Mazda B-Series pickup trucks (these were referred to as "Truxtarossa" kits), in addition to a wide variety of Japanese and American sports cars and motorcycles such as the Honda VFR.

== 512 TR ==
512 TR
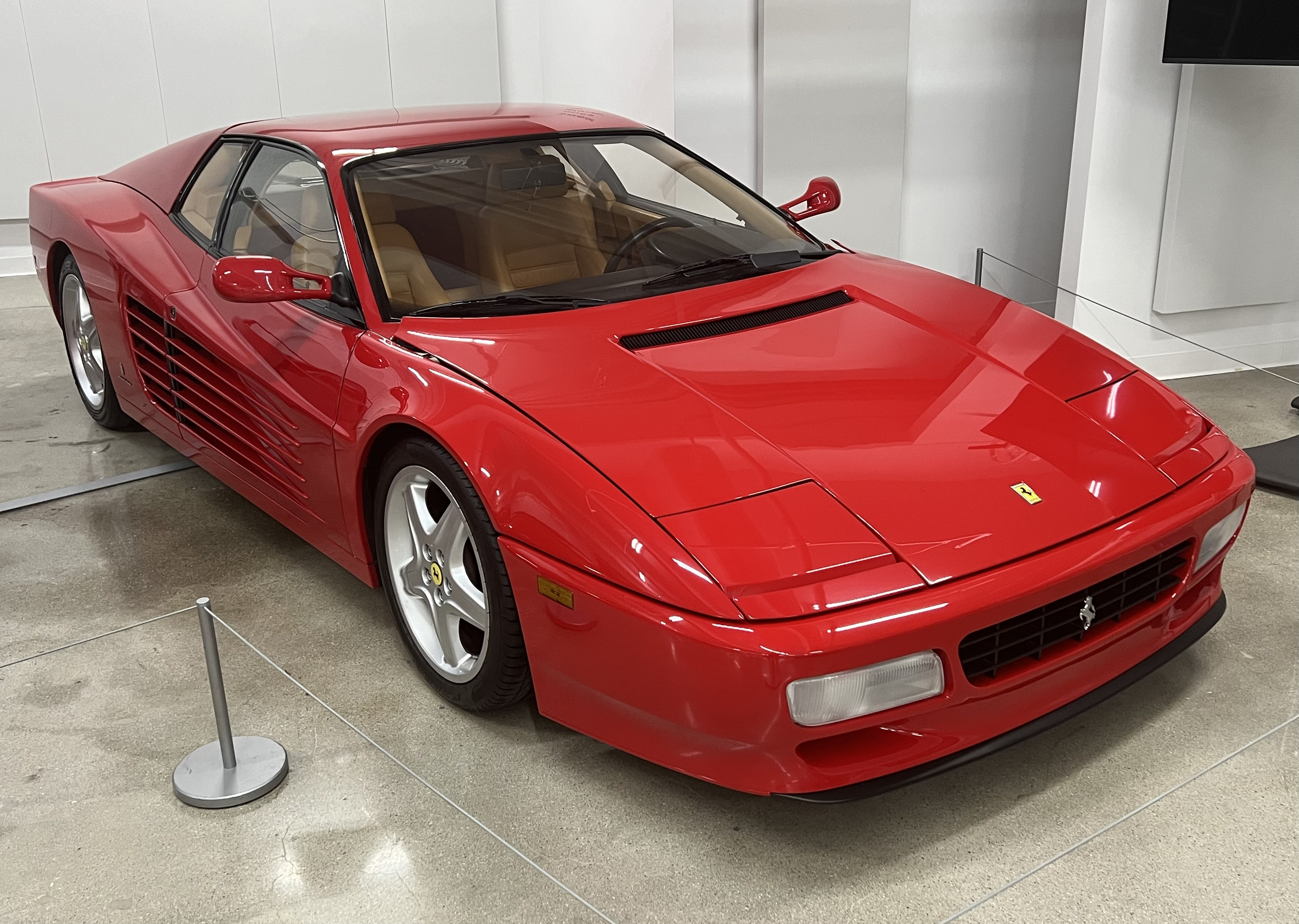

Overview
- Production: 1991–1994 (2,261 produced)

Powertrain
- Engine: 4.9 L Tipo F113 D flat-12
- Power output: 315 kW (428 PS; 422 hp)

Dimensions
- Wheelbase: 2,550 mm (100.4 in)
- Length: 4,480 mm (176.4 in)
- Width: 1,976 mm (77.8 in)
- Height: 1,135 mm (44.7 in)
- Curb weight: 1,656 kg (3,650 lb)

=== Engine ===
The 512 TR sports a 4.9-litre (4,943 cc) longitudinally rear-mounted Tipo F113 D flat-12 engine. Each cylinder of the engine has four valves, with forty-eight valves total. The engine is lubricated via a dry sump system, and has a compression ratio of 10.00:1. These combine to provide a maximum of 491 N⋅m (362 lb⋅ft) at 5,500 rpm and a maximum power output of 315 kW (428 PS; 422 hp) at 6,750 rpm.

The car can accelerate from 0–100 km/h (62 mph) in 4.8 seconds and on to 161 km/h (100 mph) in 10.7 seconds. It can complete a standing (from stationary) quarter mile in 13.2 seconds or a standing kilometre in 23.4 seconds. The 512 TR has a top speed of 313.8 km/h (195.0 mph).

Gear	Reverse	1	2	3	4	5	Final Drive
Ratio	2.428:1	2.916:1	1.882:1	1.421:1	1.087:1	0.815:1	3.45:1

A recall was issued in 1995, regarding fuel hose fitting issues. Over 400 cars had this defect which was caused by variances in temperature and environment. Another recall was issued in relation to the passive restraint system on seat belts not functioning properly, on over 2,000 cars. If the restraint system suffered a mechanical or electrical failure only the lap belt would provide safety to the occupant.

The 512 TR's engine was extensively reworked. Nikasil liners were added, along with a new air intake system, Bosch engine management system, larger intake valves, and a revised exhaust system. In addition to the higher peak power, the modifications delivered a more broad power band for better acceleration.

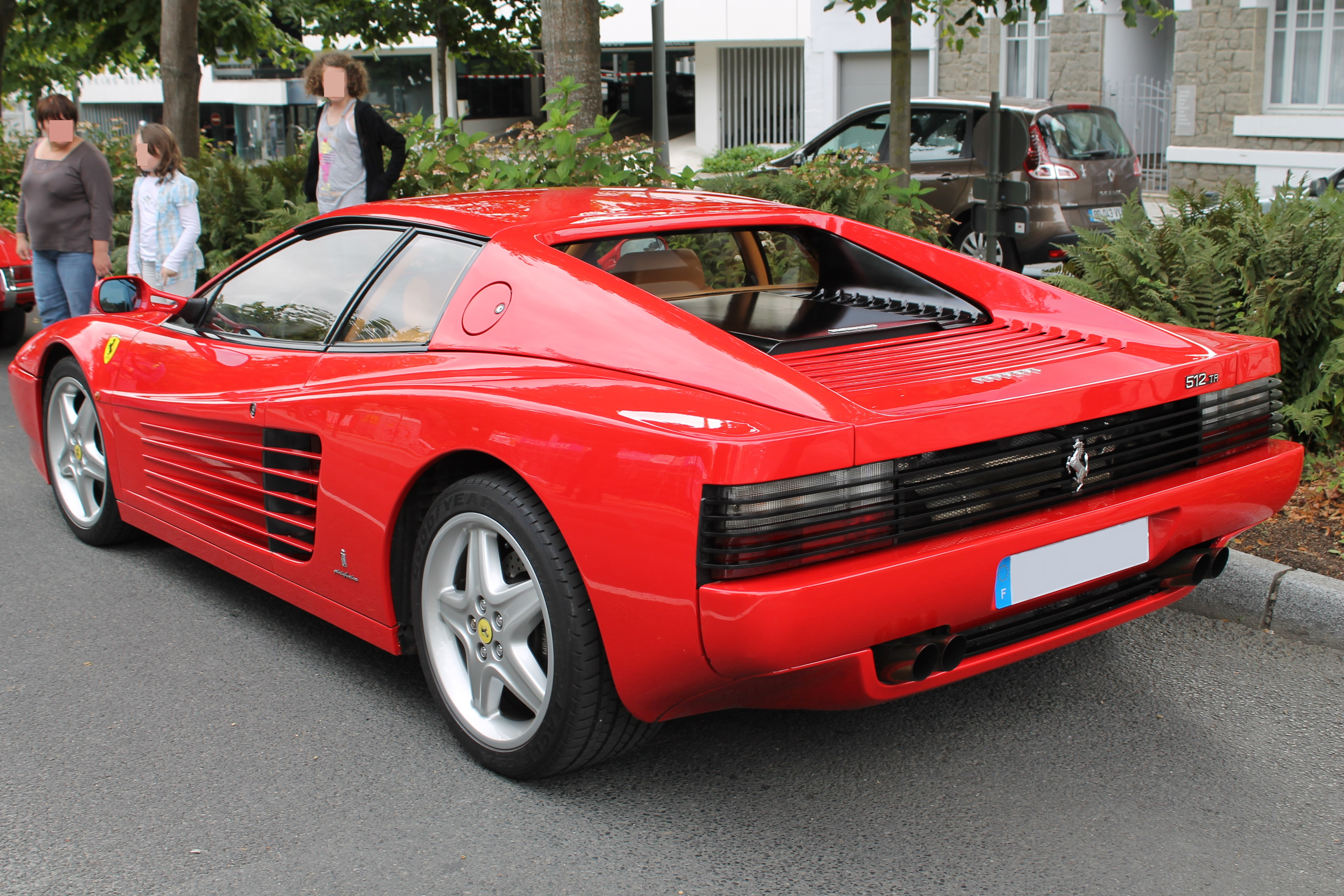
Rear view of the 512 TR

Gearshifting effort, a prolonged complaint about the Testarossa, was eased with a new single-plate clutch, sliding ball bearings, and better angle for the gearshift knob. The braking system included larger cross-drilled front rotors. Quicker steering, lower-profile tyres, and new shock settings improved handling. Most importantly, engine and gearbox position was rethought, which improved the centre of gravity, aiding the handling and making the car easier to drive.

The interior also received updates, with the centre console split from the dashboard, and the climate controls relocated. Pietro Camardella at Pininfarina was tasked with redesigning the body of the car for better integration of the newly included spoilers and the new engine cover. The design was updated in line with the recently introduced 348.

=== Wheels ===
The 512 TR has 18 in (457 mm) wheels with a width of 8 in (200 mm) at the front and 10.5 in (270 mm) at the rear. The tyre for the front wheels are 235/40 ZR 18 and 295/35 ZR 18 for the rear. The front brakes have a diameter of 315 mm (12.40 in) and the rear brakes have a diameter of 310 mm (12.20 in).

=== Notable appearances ===
The 512 TR is featured on the cover of and in the 1994 arcade racing video game The Need for Speed.

== F512 M ==
F512 M
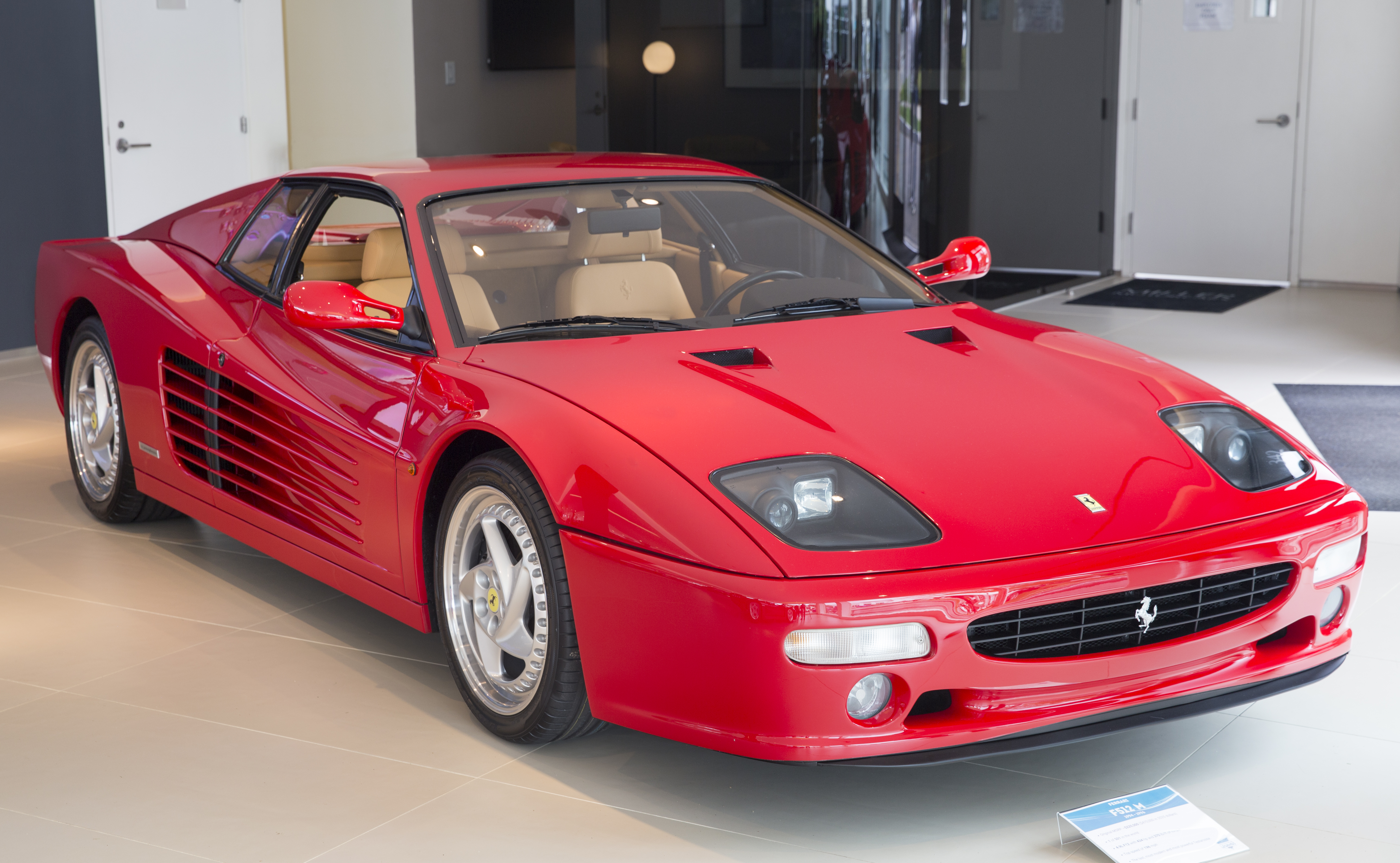

Overview
- Production: 1994–1996 (501 produced)

Powertrain
- Engine: 4.9 L Tipo F113 G flat-12

Dimensions
- Wheelbase: 2,550 mm (100.4 in)
- Length: 4,480 mm (176.4 in)
- Width: 1,976 mm (77.8 in)
- Height: 1,135 mm (44.7 in)
- Kerb weight: 1,631 kg (3,596 lb)

The F512 M was the last version of the Testarossa. 501 cars were produced in total, of which 75 were made for the North America market. It was first shown at the Paris Salon in October 1994 and the last car was built in early 1996. All United States models sold (none were sold new to Canada) were model year 1995. 75 right-hand drive cars were built.

=== Engine ===
The F512 M sports a 4.9-litre (301.6 cu in (4,943 cc)) Tipo F113 G longitudinally mid mounted flat-12 engine. This provides a maximum torque of 500 newton-metres (370 ft⋅lbf) at 5,500 rpm and a maximum power output of 324 kW (441 PS; 434 hp) at 6,750 rpm. The engine features four valves per-cylinder, for forty-eight valves total and is lubricated via a dry sump system, with a compression ratio of 10.40:1. Due to new titanium connecting rods and a new crankshaft that together weighs 7.26 kilograms (16.0 lb) less than those that they replace, the engine has a 7,500 rpm electronic rev limit.

The Ferrari F512 M can accelerate from 0 to 100 km/h (62 mph) in 4.7 seconds, on to 161 km/h (100 mph) in 10.2 seconds, and can complete a standing quarter mile in 12.7 seconds or a standing kilometre in 22.7 seconds. The F512 M has a top speed of 315 km/h (196 mph).

Gear	Final Drive
Ratio	3.31:1

=== Exterior ===
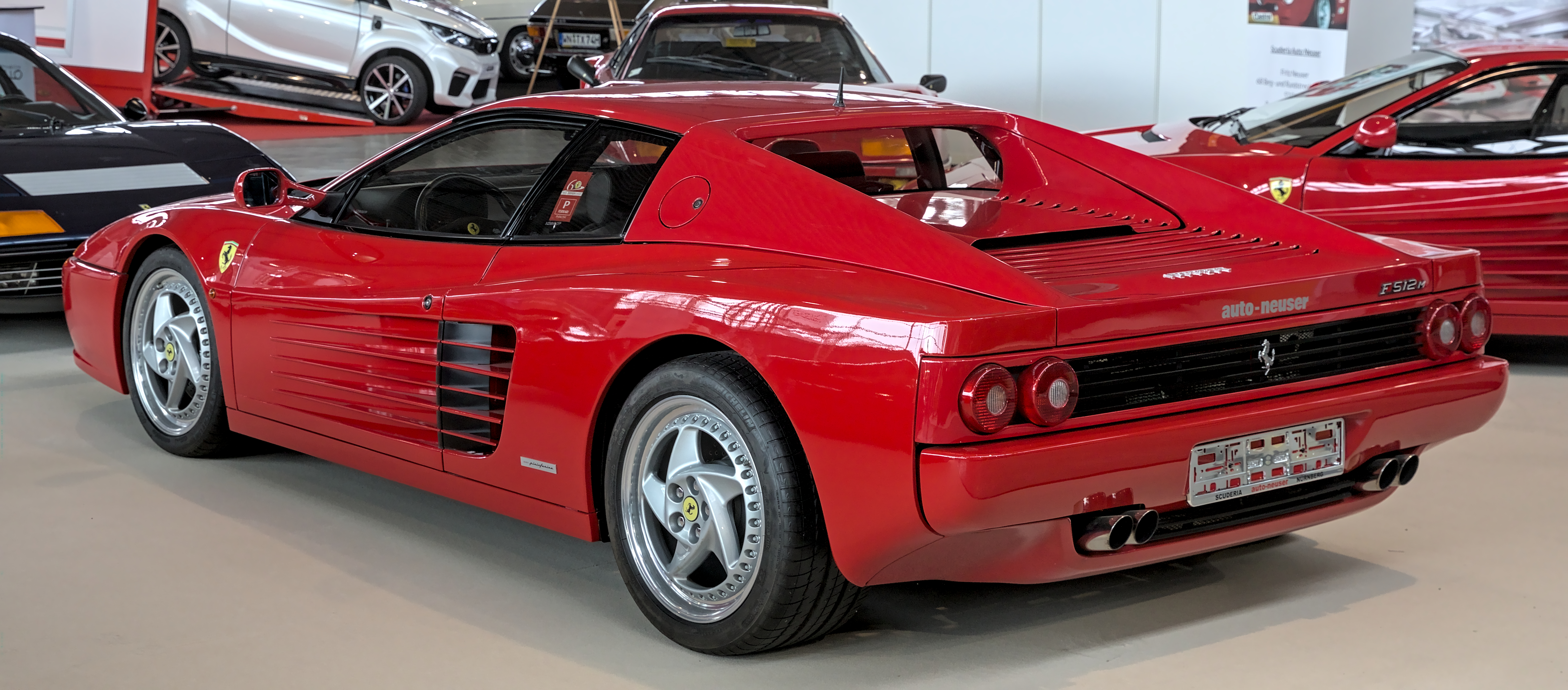
Rear view of F512 M

The front and rear lamps received a design change. The pop-up headlamps were replaced by two fixed square units. The rear taillamps were round and the bumpers had been restyled to yield a more unified look. The car featured a different front lid with twin NACA ducts.

=== Interior ===
The F512 M's interior received a minor update from the 512 TR. The gearshift knob had a chromed finish, the aluminum pedals were drilled, and air conditioning was now included as standard. Carbon fibre racing bucket seats were also available at no extra cost, weighing only 14.97 kg (33.0 lb); much less than the standard seats. Pininfarina and Ferrari flags line the dash board.

=== Wheels ===
The F512 M has 18 in (457 mm) wheels with a width of 8 in (200 mm) for front and 10.5 in (270 mm) for the rears. The tyres are Pirelli P Zero units, with codes for the front wheels of 235/40 ZR 18 and 295/35 ZR 18 for the rear. The front brakes have a diameter of 315 mm (12.4 in) and the rear brakes have a diameter of 310 mm (12.2 in).

== Concept cars and one-offs ==
=== Testarossa Spider ===
The Testarossa Spider exhibited at the Museo Casa Enzo Ferrari

The Testarossa Spider (s/n 62897) is the sole official convertible variant of the Testarossa commissioned in 1986 by the then-Fiat chairman Gianni Agnelli to commemorate his 20 years of chairmanship of the company. The Testarossa Spider has an Argento Nürburgring exterior, a white magnolia leather interior with a dark blue stripe running above the matte black sills, and a white electrically operated soft top that could be manually stowed away. The vehicle was delivered to Agnelli in four months, and had a solid silver Ferrari logo on the hood instead of an aluminium one. The silver theme refers to elemental silver's periodic table abbreviation "Ag" (from the Latin argentum), the first two letters of Agnelli's name.

Despite many requests from interested customers for a Testarossa Spider, Ferrari refused to produce the car as a regular production variant of the Testarossa, citing spatial and structural challenges that would be difficult to resolve, and so Pininfarina and some aftermarket firms such as Straman, Pavesi, Lorentz and Rankl, and Koenig Specials offered unofficial Spider conversions on special consumer requests. The official Spider is no different mechanically from the normal Testarossa available on the European market. It has a standard 4.9 L flat-12 engine with a power output of 291 kW (396 PS; 390 hp). The only differences, other than being a convertible, are that the Spider's front window and door windows are both shorter than those of the normal car and it has a special transmission manufactured by Valeo installed which is convertible to both automatic and the standard 5-speed manual versions with the push of a button, a technology ahead of its time. The transmission was installed on special request of Agnelli as he suffered from a chronic leg injury.

The original car owned by Agnelli's family friend was auctioned off in 2016 at a price of US$1.3 million. By that time, the car had been driven for 23,000 kilometers.

A red Testarossa convertible is the feature car in Sega's arcade and home-console video-game franchise Out Run.

=== Mythos ===
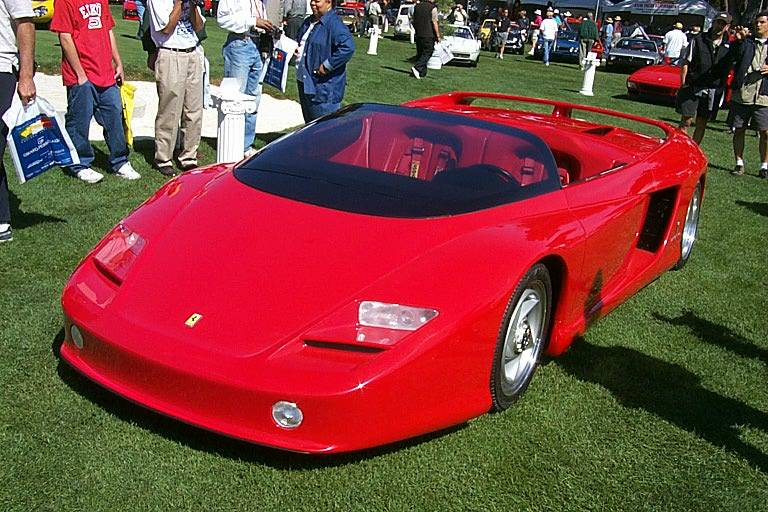
Ferrari Mythos

The Ferrari Mythos is a mid-engined, rear wheel drive concept car based on the mechanical underpinnings of the Ferrari Testarossa. The Mythos is powered by a 4.9 L Tipo F113 B Ferrari flat-12 engine sourced from the Ferrari Testarossa, the engine produces 390 hp (291 kW; 395 PS) at 6,300 rpm and 354 N⋅m (261 lb⋅ft) of torque at 4,500 rpm while having a power to weight ratio of 308 hp (230 kW) per tonne. Power is sent to the rear wheels through a Testarossa sourced 5-speed manual transmission. The car utilises a helical coil suspension system with transverse arms on the front and rear. Acceleration figures of the car remain unknown, but the car has a projected top speed of about 180 mph (290 km/h).

=== Colani Ferrari Testa d'Oro ===
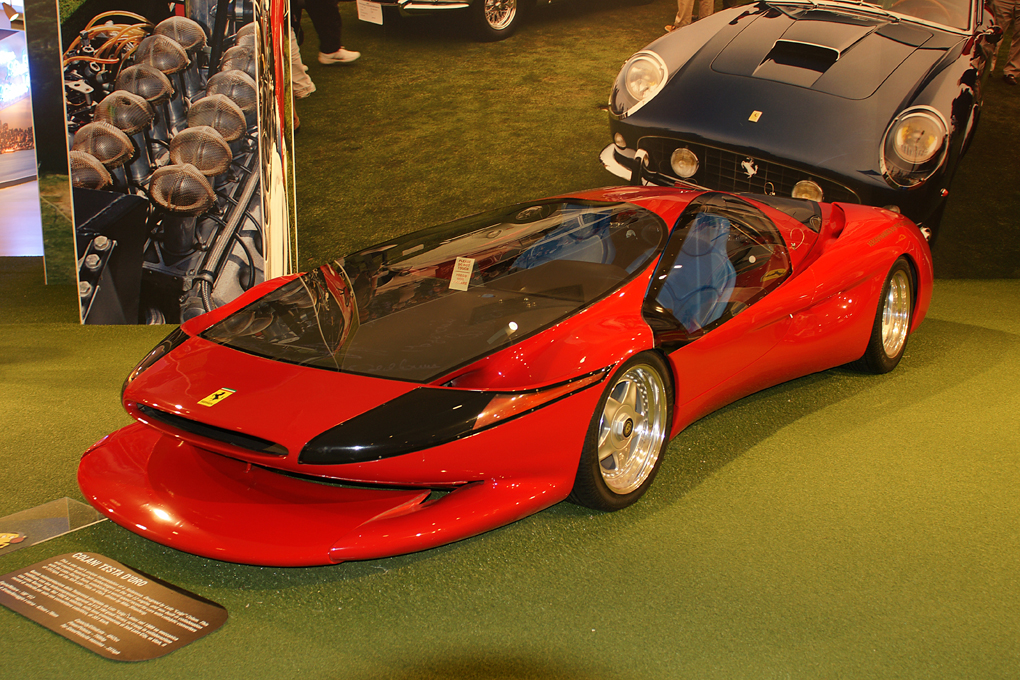
Colani Ferrari Testa d'Oro

Designed by Luigi Colani in 1989, the Testa d'Oro was designed to break land speed records at the salt flats. It was based on a Testarossa with a turbocharged flat-12 engine featuring a 5.0 L Ferrari-Lotec turbocharger. The engine had a power output of 750 hp (559 kW) at 6,400 rpm and 900 N⋅m (660 lb⋅ft) of torque at 5,000 rpm. It successfully broke the record in its class in 1991, reaching 351 km/h (218 mph) with catalytic converters fitted.

=== FX ===
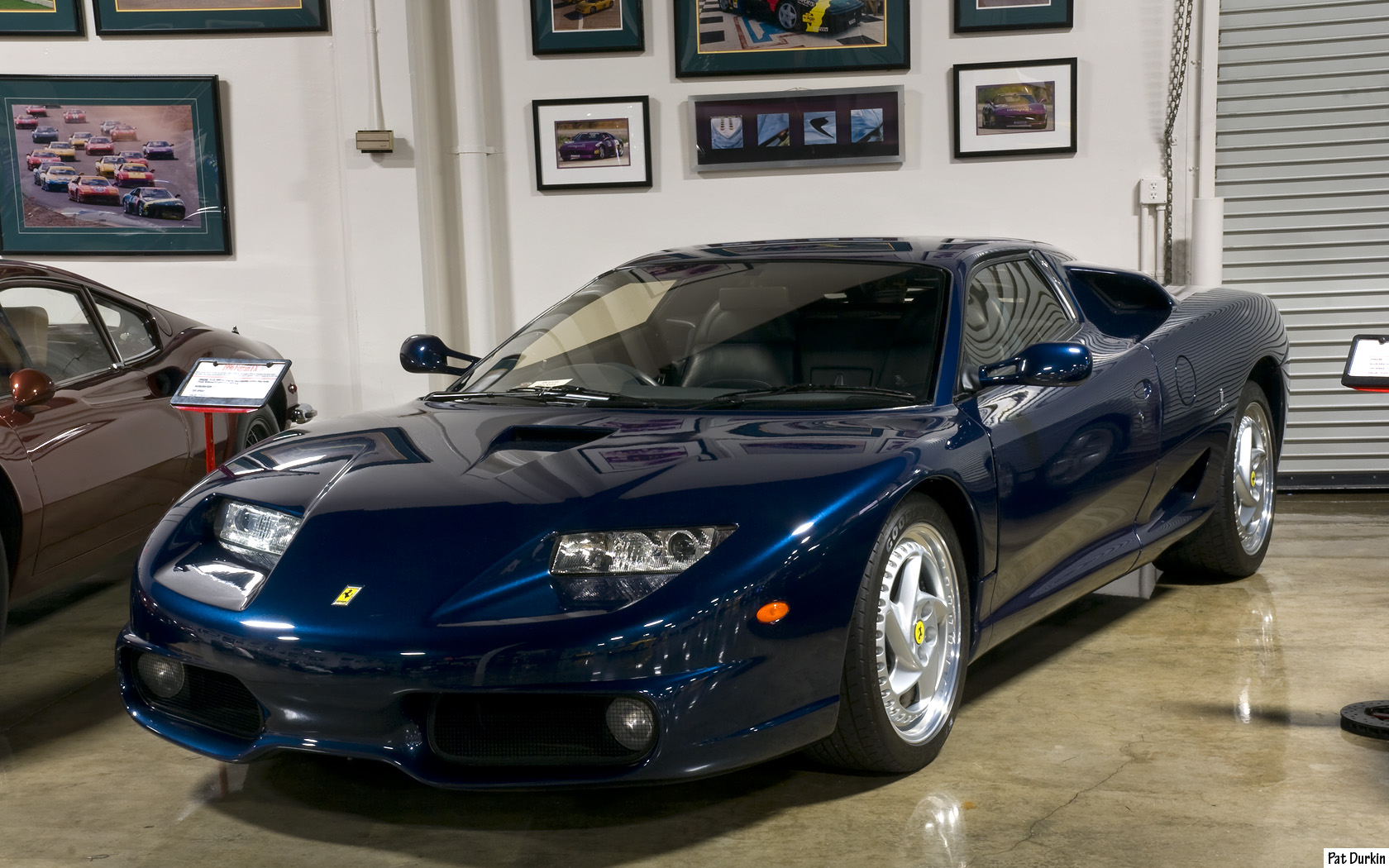
1996 Ferrari FX at the Marconi Museum

The Ferrari FX was a special order sports car custom made by Pininfarina at the request of Prince Hakeem, the eldest son of Jefri Bolkiah. It featured the flat-twelve engine of the Ferrari F512 M, on which it is based, and a 7-speed sequential manual transmission from the Williams Formula One team. Only seven or nine cars were made depending on the source, six of which were delivered to the royal family in Brunei. After Hakeem cancelled delivery of car number four, Dick Marconi bought the car from Williams. Car number four is now on display at the Marconi Automotive Museum in Tustin, California, US. The "FX" name went on to be used on the upcoming Ferrari Enzo during that car's development.

=== FZ93 ===
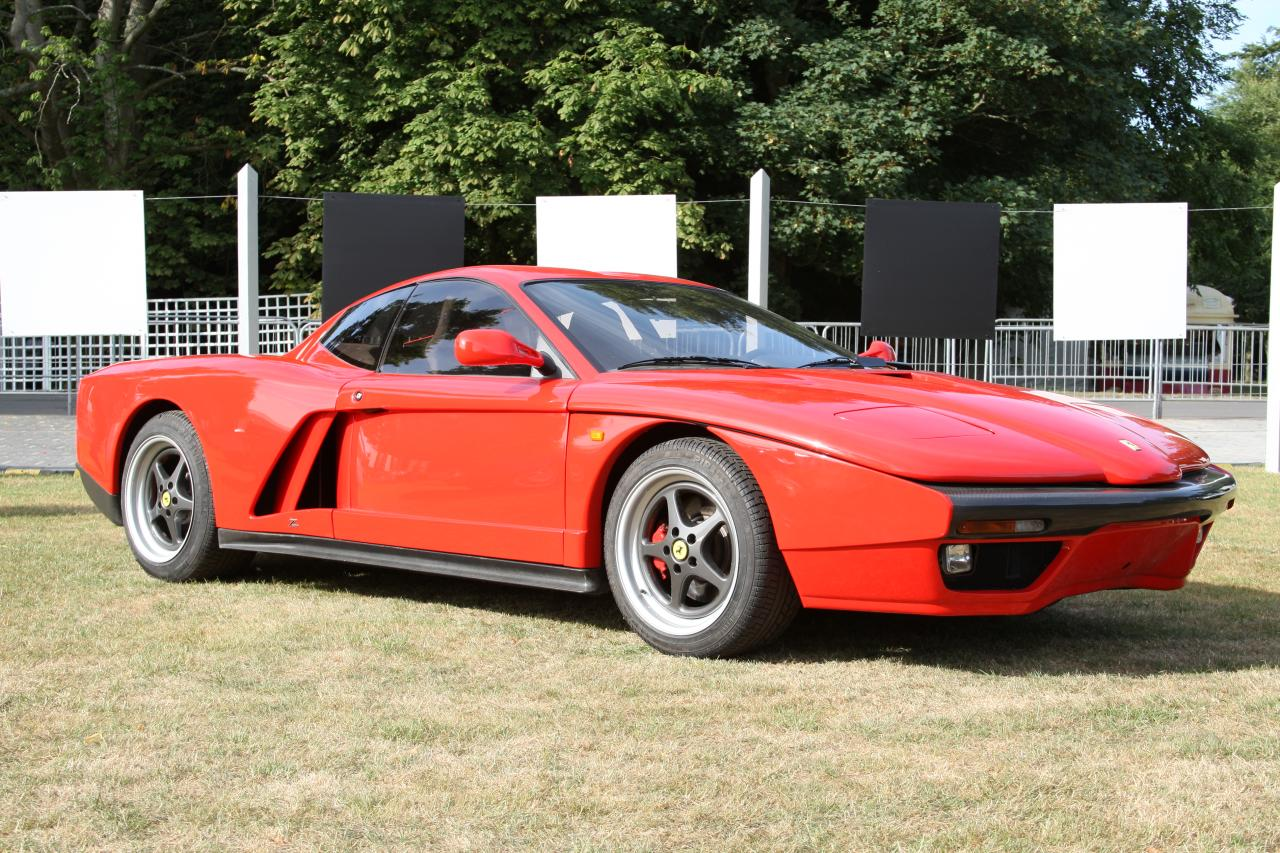
The FZ93 at the 2010 Goodwood Festival of Speed

The FZ93 (Formula Zagato '93) was designed by Ercole Spada as a follow-up to Zagato's series of Ferrari specials. In 1994 the car was reworked and repainted all-red; it was also renamed as ES1 in honour of its designer.

=== F90 ===
For almost 18 years, Ferrari denied that the F90 existed. The project was eventually discovered along with the fact that six were made for Jefri Bolkiah in 1988.

The project was managed by Enrico Fumia, the head of the Research and Development department at Pininfarina. At the time, the project was top secret to that extent that Ferrari themselves didn't know of the project. Fumia styled the car and said the F90 name referred to it being a "Ferrari of the '90s."

All six F90s used a Ferrari Testarossa chassis on top of which Pininfarina sculpted an entirely new body and interior. The engines were stock units, having a power output of 390 PS (287 kW; 385 hp) and having a rear-wheel drive layout, but the radiators were moved to the front of the car.

== Bibliography and notes ==
- Bob Johnson. "Ferrari Testarossa". Road & Track (June 1989): 64–69.
- Buckley, Martin; Rees, Chris (1998). World Encyclopedia of Cars. London: Anness Publishing. ISBN 1-84038-083-7.
- "Retail Prices, Import Cars," Automotive News, April 1986: page 53.
- William Jeanes. "Preview: Ferrari 512TR". Car and Driver (March 1992): 57–59.
- Sir Mix-A-Lot wrote the track Testarossa (on his 1992 album Mack Daddy) about his "jet black" 1987 Testarossa.
- French House/Electro artist Kavinsky has written several songs about the Testarossa, including "Testarossa Autodrive", which was remixed by SebastiAn. The Kavinsky character's back story is that he fatally crashed his Testarossa and came back from the dead to make music.
- The video and arcade game Outrun uses the Testarossa as the main car.
