= Ferrari SF90 Stradale =

Mid-engine hybrid sports car

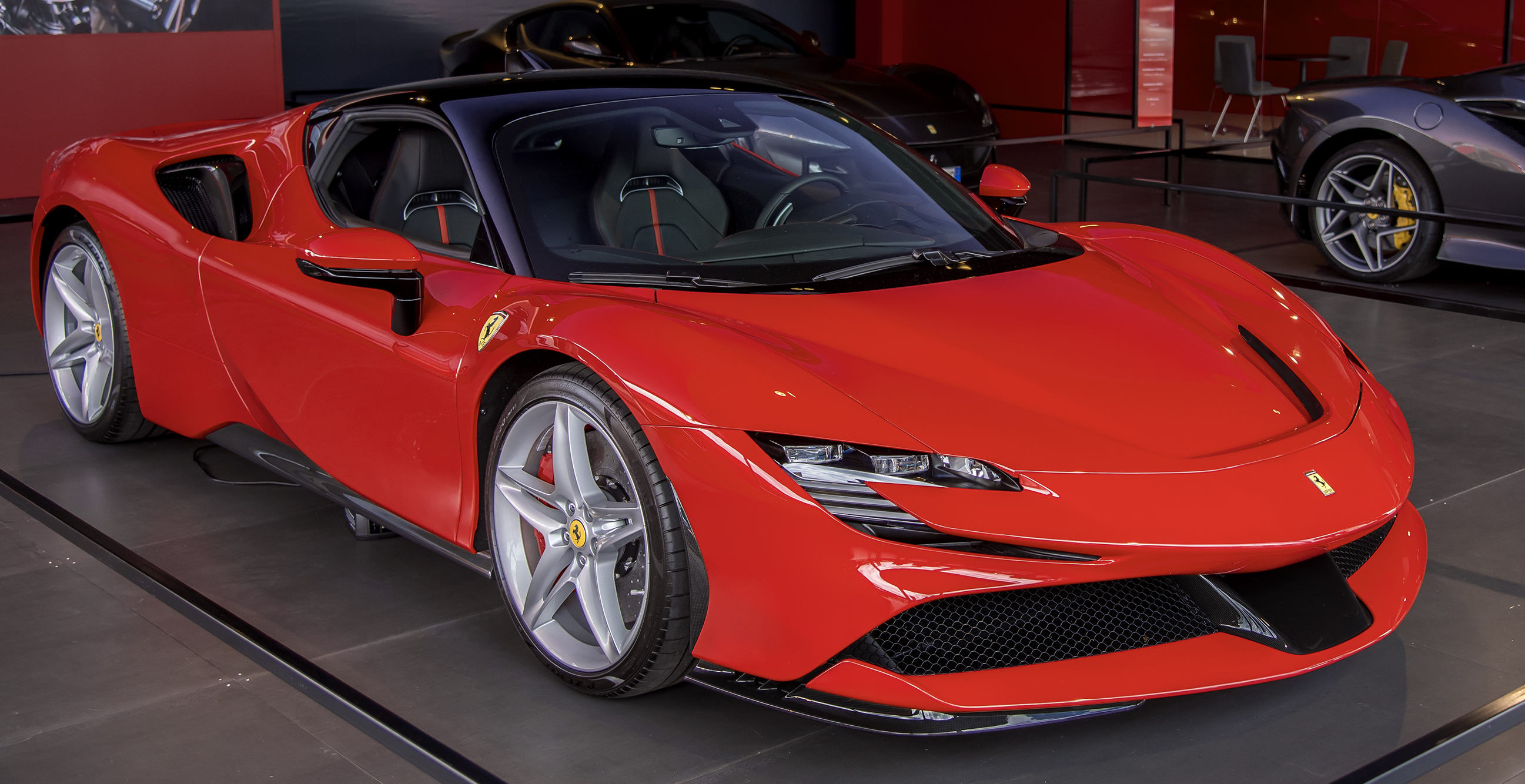

Overview
- Manufacturer: Ferrari
- Production: 2019–2024 (Stradale/Spider); 2023–2026 (XX Stradale - 799 units /XX Spider - 599 units; 1,398 units)
- Model years: 2020–2026
- Assembly: Italy: Maranello
- Designer: Ferrari Styling Centre under the direction of Flavio Manzoni

Body and chassis
- Class: Sports car (S)
- Body style: 2-door berlinetta 2-door retractable hard-top convertible
- Layout: Longitudinal mid-engine, all-wheel-drive
- Related: Ferrari 296 GTB

Powertrain
- Engine: 4.0 L (3,990 cc) F154 FA twin-turbocharged V8
- Electric motor: 3 electric motors (one mounted on the transmission and one on each front wheel)
- Power output: Engine: 574 kW (780 PS; 769 hp); Electric motors: 162 kW (220 PS; 217 hp); Combined: 735 kW (1,000 PS; 986 hp)
- Transmission: 8-speed Magna 8DCL900 dual-clutch
- Hybrid drivetrain: PHEV
- Battery: 7.9 kWh lithium-ion
- Electric range: 26 km (16 miles)

Dimensions
- Wheelbase: 2,650 mm (104.3 in)
- Length: 4,710 mm (185.4 in)
- Width: 1,972 mm (77.6 in)
- Height: 1,186 mm (46.7 in)
- Kerb weight: 1,600 kg (3,527 lb) (base, dry); 1,570 kg (3,461 lb) (Assetto Fiorano, dry); 1,670 kg (3,682 lb) (spider, kerb)

Chronology
- Successor: Ferrari 849 Testarossa

The Ferrari SF90 Stradale (Type F173) is a mid-engine PHEV (plug-in hybrid electric vehicle) sports car produced by the Italian automobile manufacturer Ferrari. The car shares its name with the SF90 Formula One car with 90 standing for the 90th anniversary of the Scuderia Ferrari racing team and also "Stradale", an Italian word for "made for the road".

== Design ==
The manufacturer claims that the SF90 Stradale can generate 390 kg (860 lb) of downforce at 250 km/h (155 mph) due to new findings in aero and thermal dynamics.

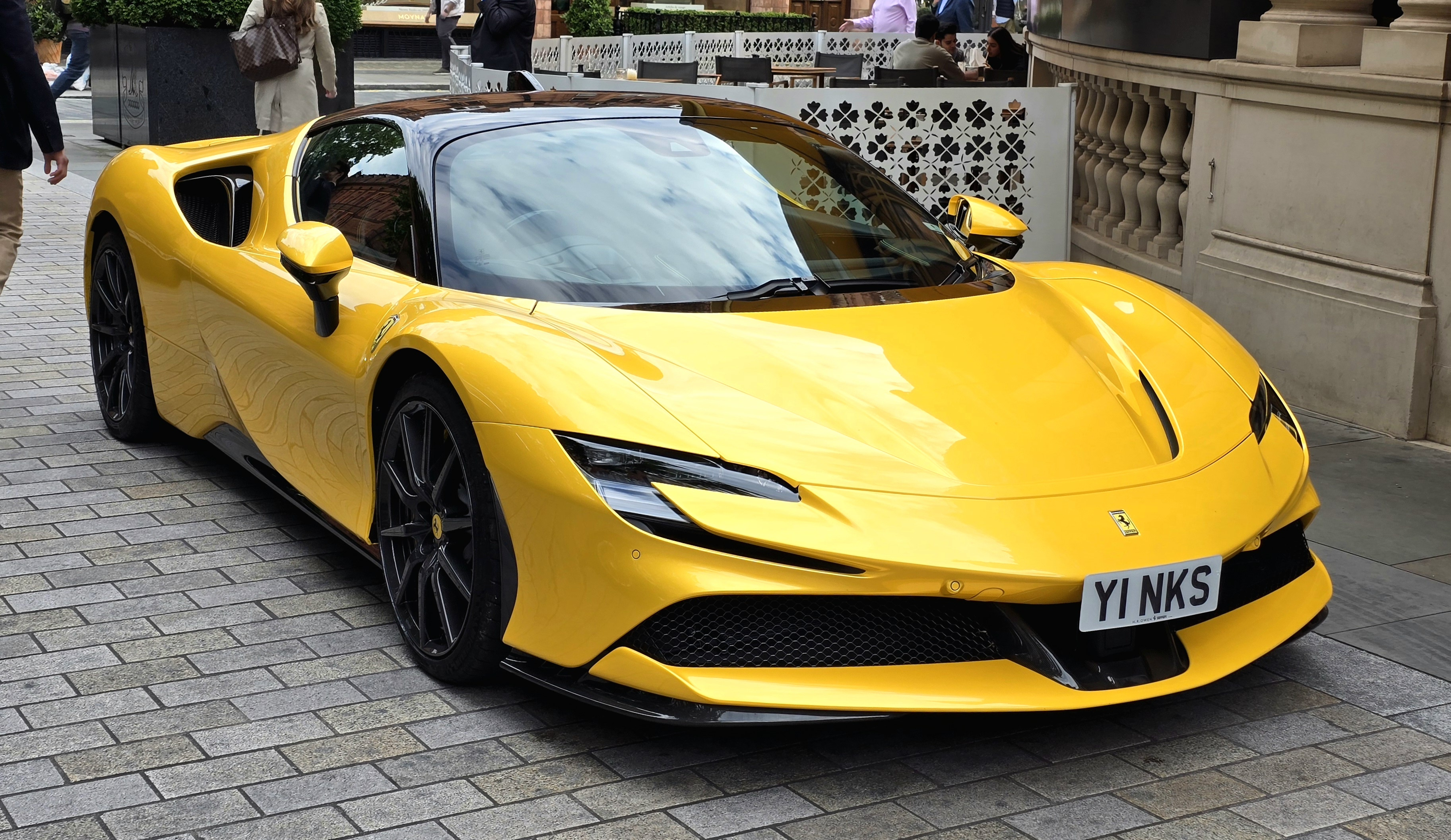
Ferrari SF90 Stradale

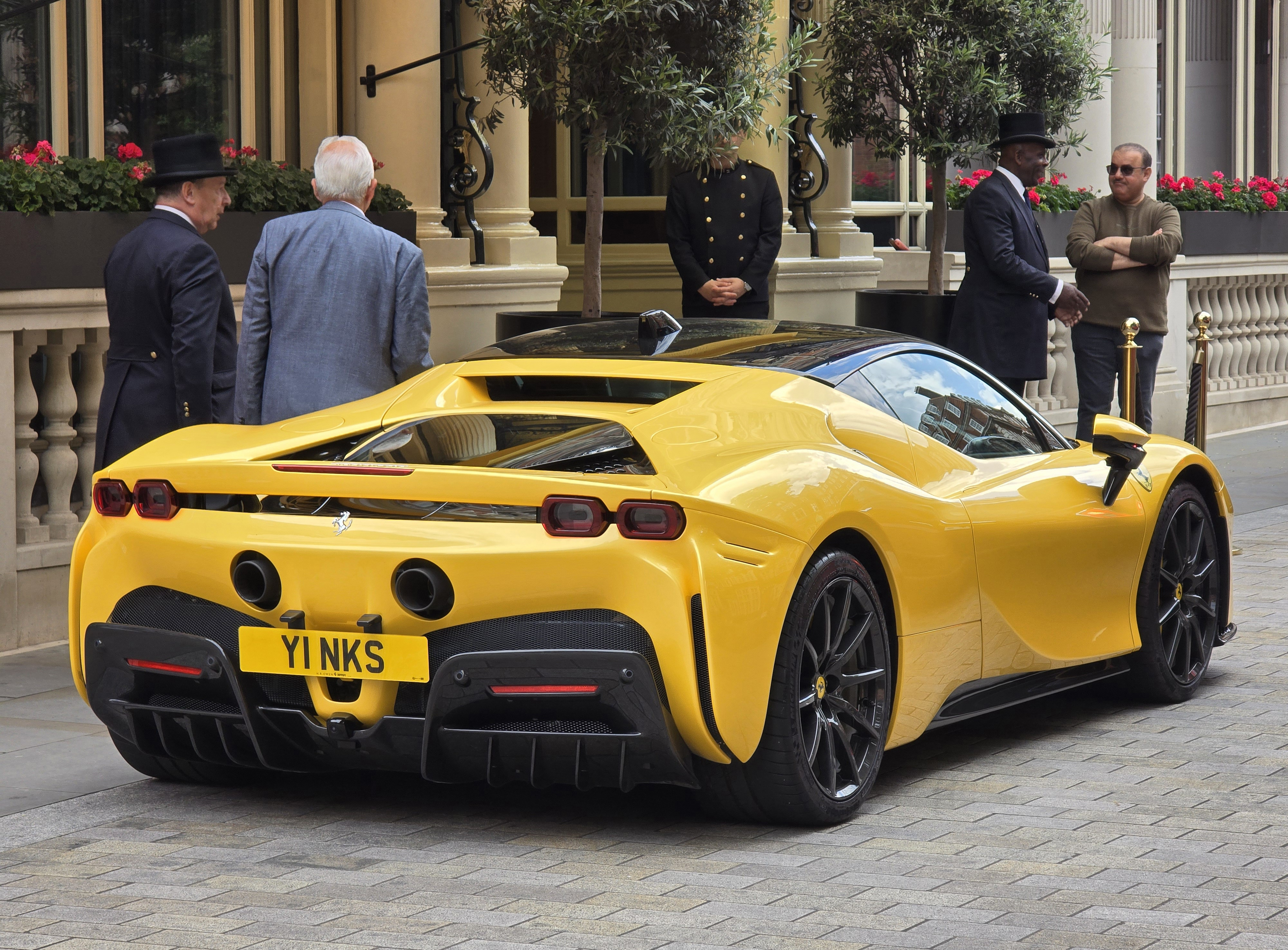
Rear view

The main feature of the design is the twin-part rear wing which is an application of the drag reduction system (DRS) used in Formula One. A fixed element in the wing incorporates the rear light, the mobile parts of the wing (called "shut off Gurney" by the manufacturer) integrate into the body by using electric actuators in order to maximise downforce. The SF90 Stradale uses an evolution of Ferrari's vortex generators mounted at the front of the car.

The car employs a cab-forward design in order to utilise the new aerodynamic parts of the car more effectively and in order to incorporate radiators for the cooling requirements of the hybrid system of the car. The design is a close collaboration between Ferrari Styling Centre and Ferrari engineers.

The rear-end of the car carries over many iconic Ferrari Styling elements such as the flying buttresses. The engine cover has been kept as low as possible in order to maximise airflow. According to the car's lead designer, Flavio Manzoni, the car's design lies in between that of a spaceship and of a race car. The rear side-profile harkens back to the 1960s 330 P3/4.

== Specifications ==
=== Battery and driving modes ===
The car has a 7.9 kWh lithium-ion battery for regenerative braking, giving the car 26 km (16 miles) of electric range. The car comes with four driving modes depending on road conditions. The modes are changed by the eManettino knob present on the steering wheel.

The eDrive mode runs the car only on the electric motors. The Hybrid mode runs the car on both the internal combustion engine and the electric motors and is the car's default mode. In this mode, the car's onboard computer (called control logic) also turns off the engine if the conditions are ideal in order to save fuel while allowing the driver to start the engine again. The Performance mode keeps the engine running in order to charge the batteries and keeps the car responsive for optimum performance. The Qualify mode uses the powertrain to its full potential.

The control logic system makes use of three primary areas: the high-voltage controls of the car (including the batteries), the RAC-e (Rotation Axis Control-electric) torque vectoring system, and the MGUK along with the engine and gearbox.

=== Powertrain ===
The SF90 Stradale is equipped with three electric motors, adding a combined output of 162 kW (220 PS; 217 hp) to a twin-turbocharged V8 engine rated at a power output of 735 kW (1,000 PS; 986 hp) at 7,500 rpm. and a maximum torque of 800 N⋅m (590 lb⋅ft) at 6,000 rpm.

The F154 engine is an evolution of the unit found in the 488 Pista and the F8 Tributo models. The engine's capacity is now 4.0 L (3,990 cc) by increasing each cylinder bore to 88 mm (3.46 in). The intake and exhaust of the engine have been completely modified. The cylinder heads of the engine are now narrower and the all-new central fuel injectors run at a pressure of 35 MPa (5,100 psi). The assembly for the turbochargers is lower than that of the exhaust system and the engine sits 50 mm (2.0 in) lower in the chassis than the other mid-engine V8 models in order to maintain a lower center of gravity. The engine utilises a smaller flywheel and an inconel exhaust manifold.

The front wheels are powered by two electric motors (one for each wheel), providing torque vectoring. They also function as the reversing gear, as the main transmission (eight-speed dual-clutch) does not have a reversing gear.

=== Transmission ===
The engine of the SF90 Stradale is mated to a new 8-speed dual-clutch transmission. The new transmission is 10 kg (22 lb) lighter and more compact than the existing 7-speed transmission used by the other offerings of the manufacturer partly due to the absence of a dedicated reverse gear since reversing is provided by the electric motors mounted on the front axle. The new transmission also has a 30% faster shift time (200 milliseconds).

=== Interior ===
A 410 mm (16 in) curved display located behind the steering wheel displays various vital statistics of the car to the driver. The car also employs a new head-up display that would reconfigure itself according to the selected driving mode. The steering wheel is carried over from the F8 but now features multiple capacitive touch interfaces to control the various functions of the car. Other conventional levers and buttons are retained. The interior will also channel the sound of the engine to the driver according to the manufacturer.

=== Handling ===
The SF90 Stradale employs eSSC (electric Side Slip Control) which controls the torque distribution to all four wheels of the car. The eSSC is combined with eTC (electric Tractional Control), a new brake-by-wire system which combines the traditional hydraulic braking system and electric motors to provide optimal regenerative braking and torque vectoring.

=== Chassis ===
The car's all-new chassis combines aluminium and carbon fibre to improve structural rigidity and provide a suitable platform for the car's hybrid system. The car has a total dry weight of 1,570 kg (3,461 lb) after combining the 270 kg (595 lb) weight of the electric system.

=== Performance ===
Ferrari states that the SF90 Stradale is capable of accelerating from a standstill to 100 km/h (62 mph) in 2.5 seconds, 0–200 km/h (124 mph) in 6.7 seconds and can attain a top speed of 340 km/h (211 mph). It is the fastest Ferrari road car on their Fiorano Circuit as of 2020, seven tenths of a second faster than the LaFerrari.

In 2020, the Ferrari SF90 Stradale became the fastest car ever to lap the Top Gear test track and be shown in the programme, with a lap time of 1:11.3.

== Variants ==
=== SF90 Spider ===
The SF90 Spider is an open-top variant of the SF90 Stradale equipped with a retractable hardtop. It is the first Ferrari plug-in hybrid car offered as an open-top variant. It is also the most powerful non-limited convertible car in the world, having a combined power of 735 kW (1,000 PS; 986 hp). The previous record was held by the Ferrari 812 GTS. Performance is very similar to the closed-body variant and on par with LaFerrari Aperta.

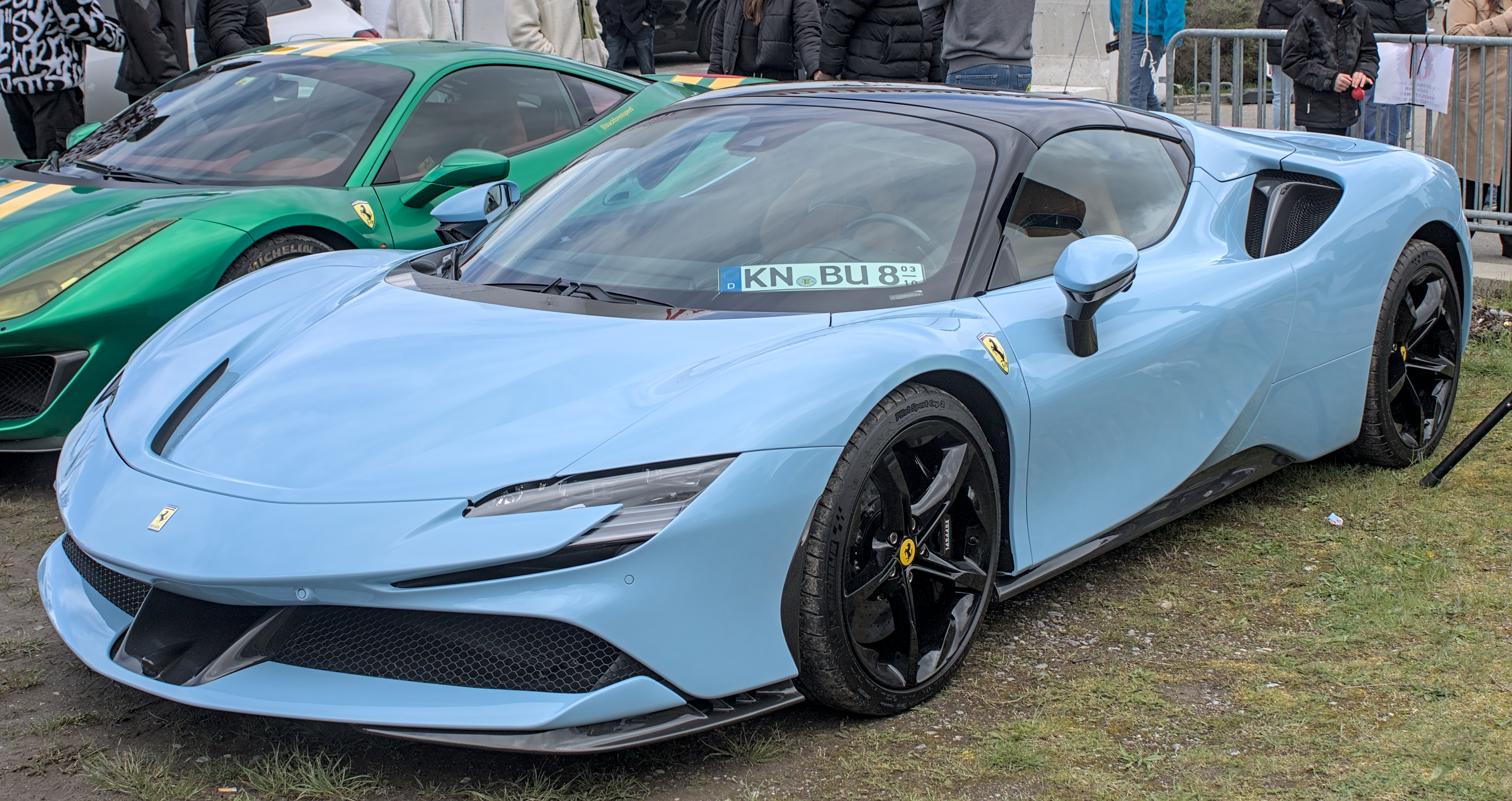
SF90 Spider

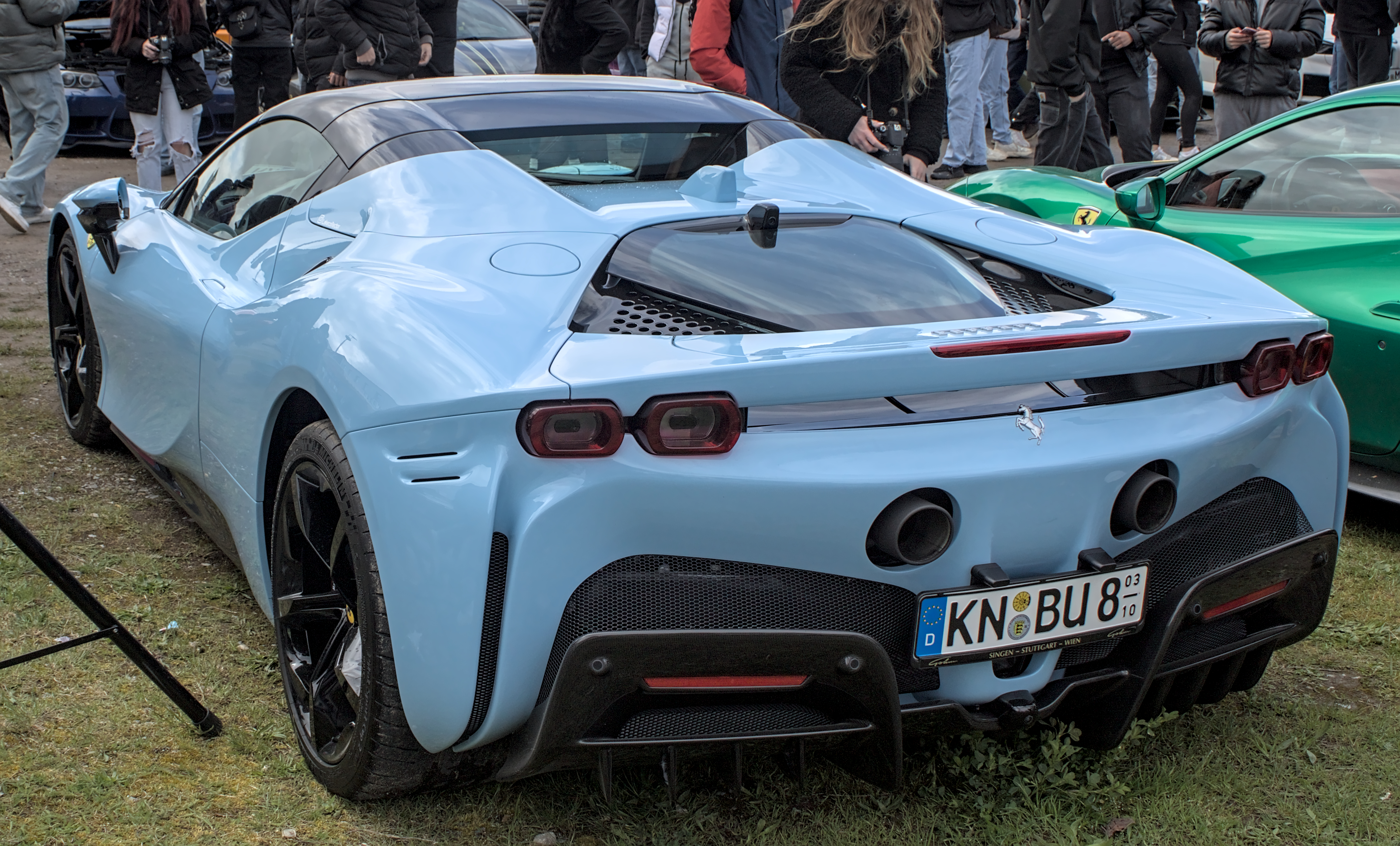
Rear view

=== Assetto Fiorano ===
The Assetto Fiorano is a racing modification pack for the SF90 Stradale or Spider. It uses racing-derived Multimatic shocks and lightweight carbon fibre parts embedded in the door panels and underbody. The Assetto Fiorano also employs a lightweight titanium exhaust system and carbon wheels. These measures save 30 kg (66 lb) compared to the standard SF90 Stradale.

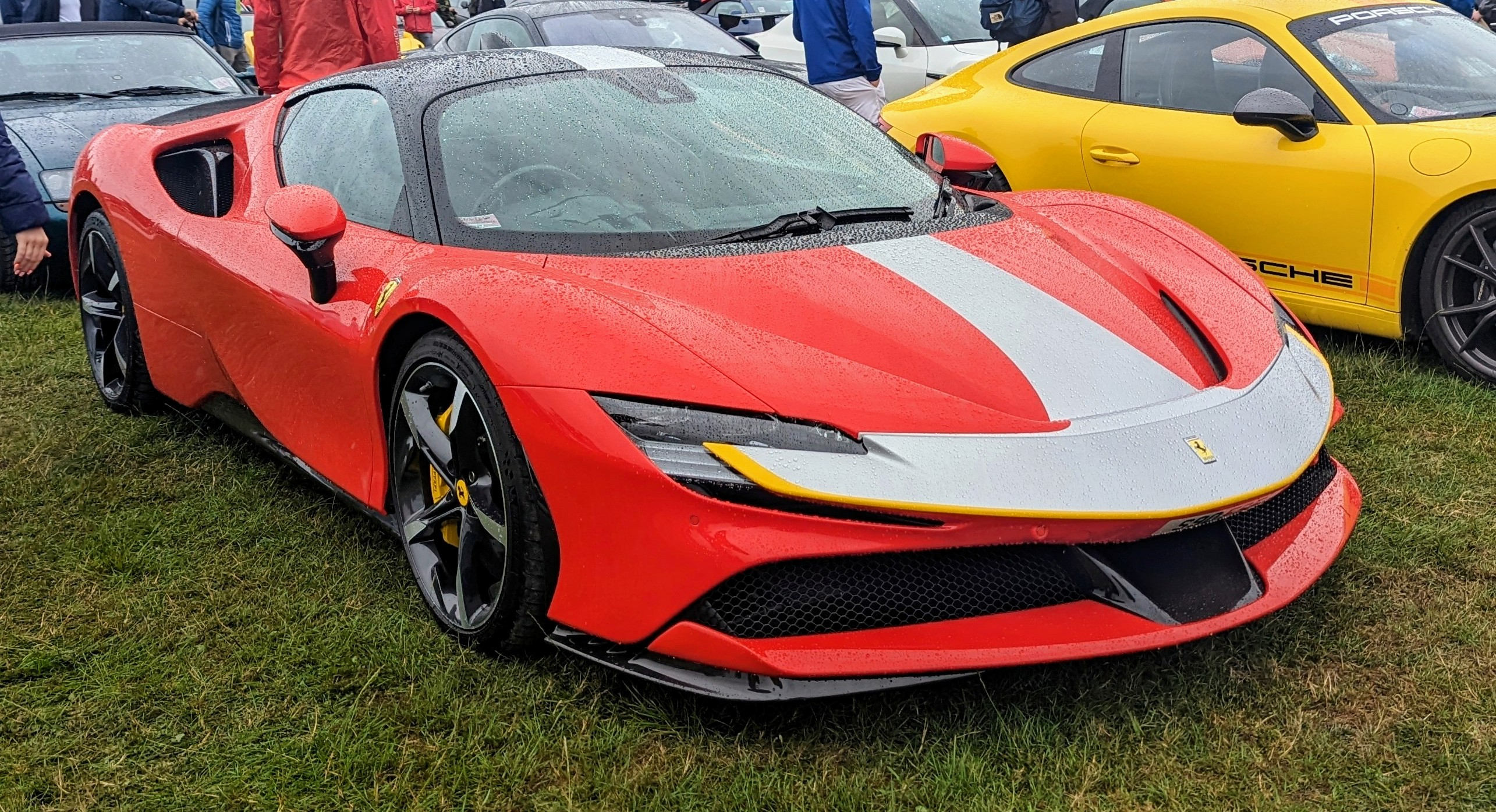
Assetto Fiorano-specific paint job

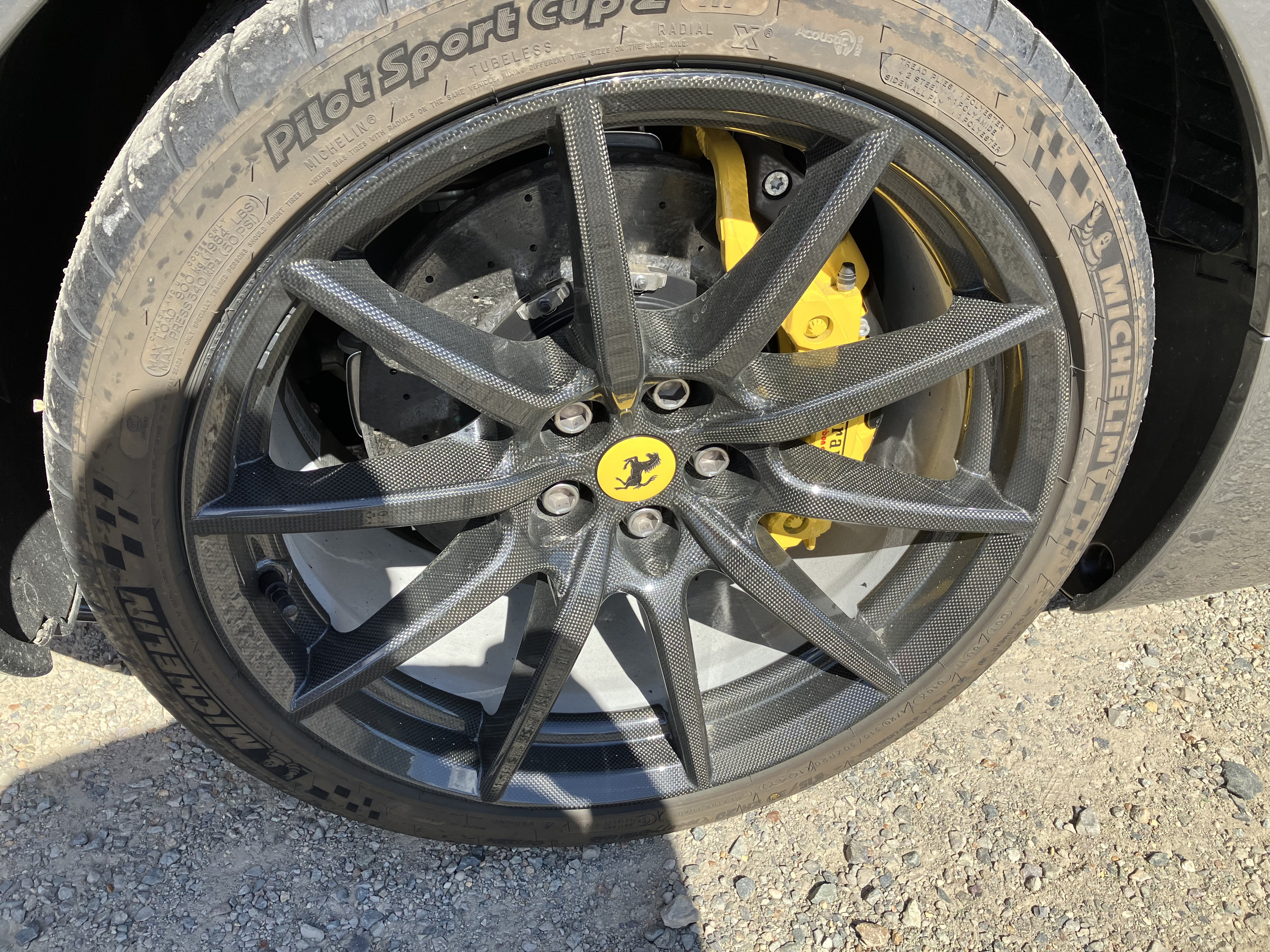
Carbon wheels with Michelin Pilot Sport Cup 2 315/30 ZR20 tires

=== SF90 XX ===
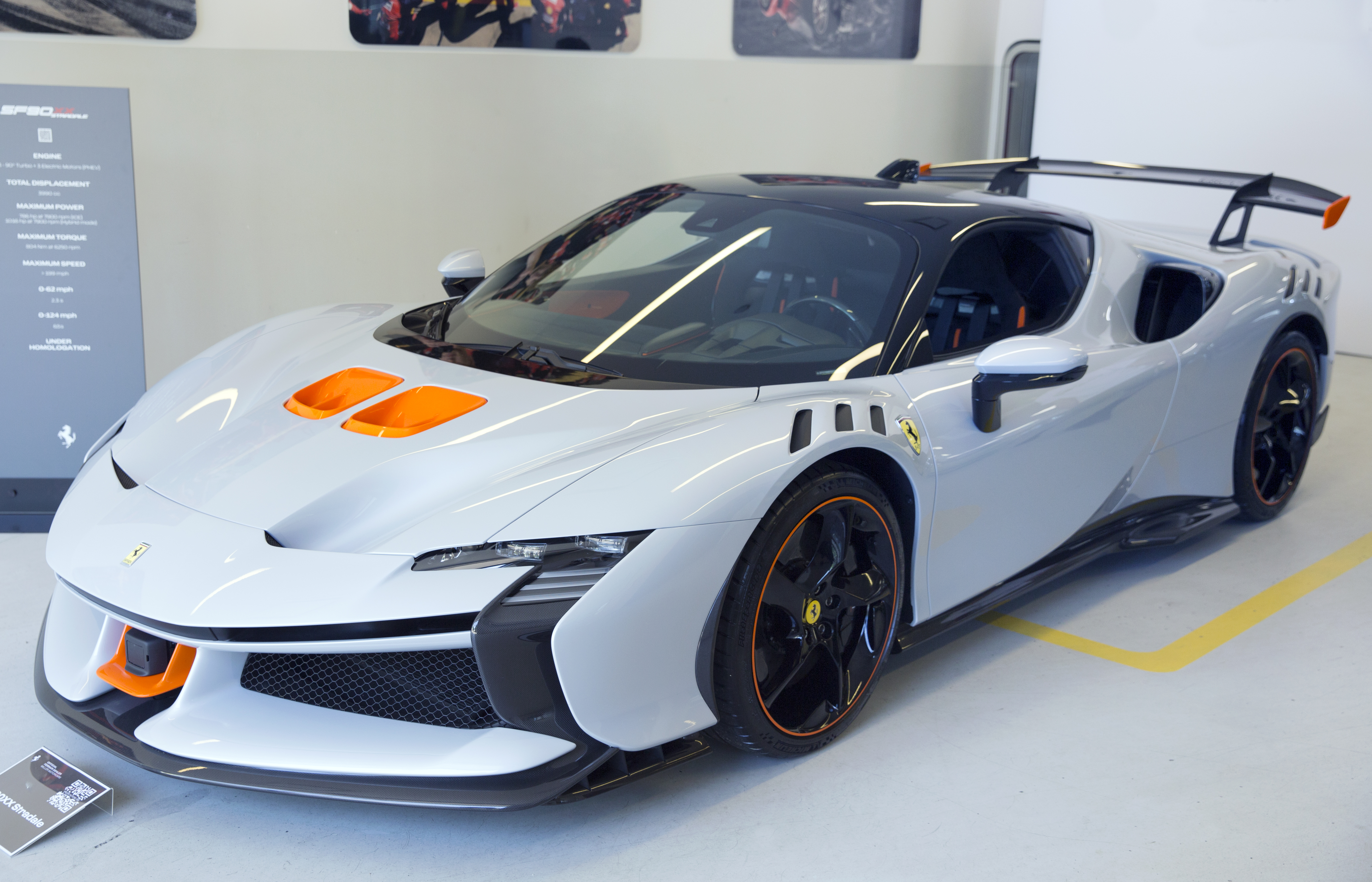
2024 Ferrari SF90 XX Stradale

The SF90 XX Stradale/Spider is the track focused version of the SF90 Stradale/Spider. Unlike the track-only Ferrari FXX, 599XX, and FXX-K models, the SF90 XX is road legal, although it is track focused. The SF90 XX is designed to provide one of the most efficient aerodynamic performance of any road-legal car in Ferrari's history.

The hybrid powerplant used in the SF90 XX Stradale/Spider has a total power output of 758 kW (1,030 PS; 1,016 hp) and over 804 N⋅m (593 lb⋅ft), of which 586 kW (797 PS; 786 hp) are delivered by the V8 ICE and 171 kW (233 PS; 230 hp) by the electric motor.

Ferrari built 799 units of the XX Stradale and 599 units of the XX Spider, which have all been pre-allocated to customers.

== One-offs ==
=== CZ26 ===
Ferrari CZ26

The Ferrari CZ26 is a one-off special project based on the SF90 Stradale. Created by Ferrari Special Projects programme for an individual client, it was unveiled at the 2026 Pebble Beach Concours d'Elegance during Monterey Car Week. Ferrari described the car as a complete reinterpretation of the SF90 Stradale, with a bespoke exterior designed by the Ferrari Design Studio, led by Flavio Manzoni.

== See also ==
- List of production cars by power output
- List of Ferrari road cars
