= List of Ferrari Special Projects cars =

Ferrari's Special Projects program, also called the Portfolio Coachbuilding Program, was launched in 2008 as a way to revive the tradition of past one-off and limited production coachbuilt Ferrari models, allowing clients to work with Ferrari and top Italian coachbuilders to create bespoke bodied models based on modern Ferrari road cars. Engineering and design is done by Ferrari, sometimes in cooperation with external design houses such as Pininfarina or Fioravanti, and the vehicles receive full homologation to be road legal. Since the creation of Ferrari's in-house styling center in 2010, the focus has shifted away somewhat from outside coachbuilders and more towards creating new in-house designs for clients.

== List ==
The following is a list of Special Projects cars that have been made public:

| Name | Picture | Year | Based on | Commissioned by | Notes |
|---|---|---|---|---|---|
| SP1 | | 2008 | F430 | Junichiro Hiramatsu | Designed by Leonardo Fioravanti, inspired by the 1998 F100 concept by Fioravanti. |
| P540 Superfast Aperta | | 2009 | 599 GTB | Edward Walson | Inspired by a similarly gold-painted and open-topped one-off built by Carrozzeria Fantuzzi on a Ferrari 330 LMB chassis. Designed by Pininfarina. |
| Superamerica 45 | | 2011 | 599 GTB | Peter Kalikow | Features a rotating targa top; designed by Ferrari Styling Centre. |
| SP12 EC | | 2012 | 458 Italia | Eric Clapton | Designed by Ferrari Styling Centre and Pininfarina, in homage to the 512 BB. |
| SP30 | | 2013 | 599 GTO | Cheerag Arya | Designed by Ferrari Styling Centre. |
| SP FFX | | 2014 | FF | Shin Okamoto | Designed by Pininfarina. |
| F12 TRS | | 2014 | F12berlinetta | Sam Li | Barchetta body, inspired by the Ferrari 250 Testa Rossa. Designed by Ferrari Styling Centre. |
| SP America | | 2014 | F12berlinetta | Danny Wegman | Designed by Pininfarina. |
| 458 MM Speciale | | 2016 | 458 Speciale | — | Designed by Ferrari Styling Centre. |
| SP275 RW Competizione | | 2016 | F12tdf | Rick Workman | Inspired by the 1964 275 GTB/C Speciale. Designed by Pininfarina in collaboration with Ferrari Styling Centre. |
| GScinquanta | | 2017 | F12tdf | N/A | |
| J50 | | 2017 | 488 Spider | N/A | Designed by Ferrari Design Center team in Maranello directed by Flavio Manzoni. |
| SP38 | | 2018 | 488 GTB | Deborah Mayer | Inspired by the F40 and 308. |
| SP3JC | | 2018 | F12tdf | John Collins | Designed by the Ferrari Styling Centre. Two matching cars ordered, one in LHD, the other in RHD with different liveries. Took 3.5 years to complete. Presented in 2018. |
| P80/C | | 2019 | 488 GT3 | TK Mak | One-off track-only car inspired by the 330 P3, 330 P4 and the Dino 206 S. |
| Omologata | | 2020 | 812 Superfast | — | Designed by Ferrari Design Center team in Maranello directed by Flavio Manzoni. |
| BR20 | | 2021 | GTC4Lusso | — | Fastback coupé instead of a shooting brake. Inspired by the 410 Superamerica and 500 Superfast. |
| SP48 Unica | | 2022 | F8 Tributo | — | |
| SP51 | | 2022 | 812 GTS | — | |
| KC23 | | 2023 | 488 GT3 Evo | — | |
| SP-8 | | 2023 | F8 | — | |
| SC40 | | 2025 | 296 GTB | | Designed by Centro Stile Ferrari direction of Flavio Manzoni. |
| HC25 | | 2025 | F8 | – | |
| CZ26 | | 2026 | SF90 Stradale | – | |
