= Ferrari F8 =

V8 sports car produced by Ferrari as a successor to the Ferrari 488

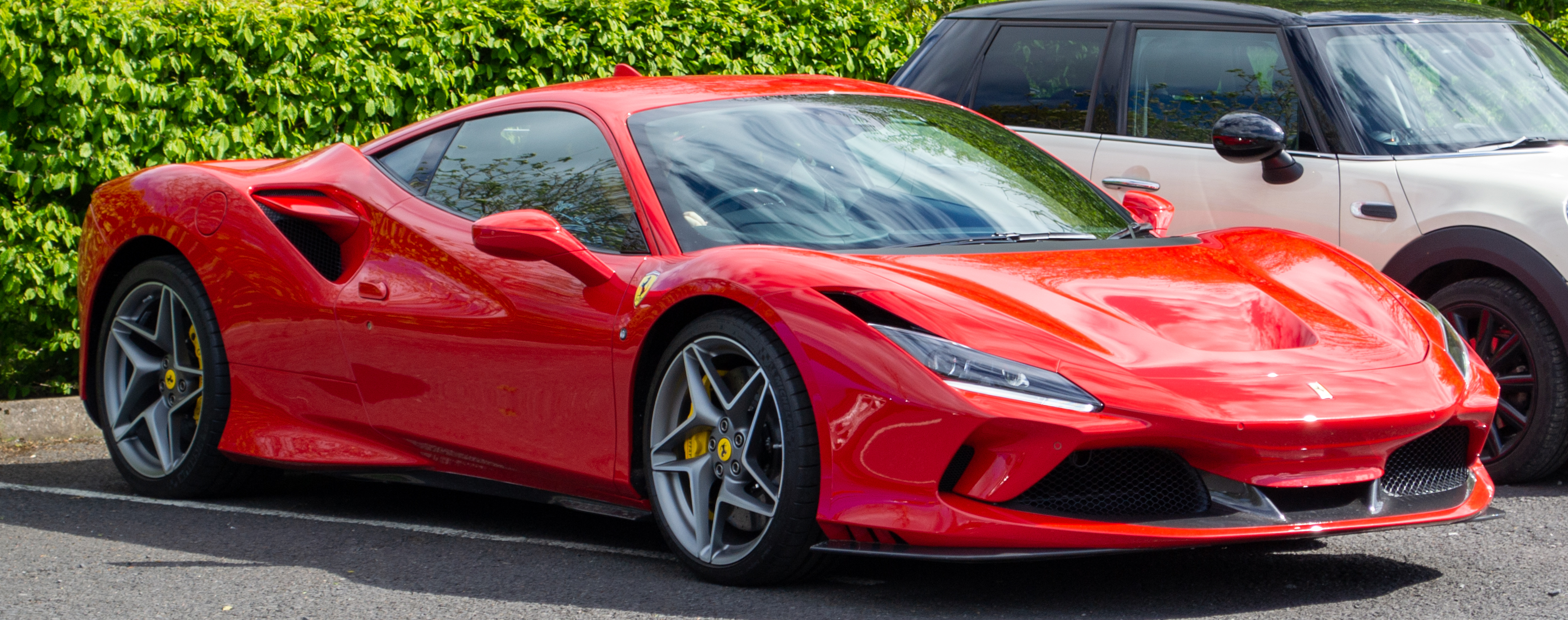

Overview
- Manufacturer: Ferrari
- Production: 2019–2023
- Assembly: Italy: Maranello
- Designer: Ferrari Styling Centre under Flavio Manzoni

Body and chassis
- Class: Sports car (S)
- Body style: 2-door berlinetta 2-door retractable hard-top convertible
- Layout: Rear mid-engine, rear-wheel-drive

Powertrain
- Engine: 3.9 L F154 CG twin-turbo V8
- Power output: 720 PS (530 kW; 710 hp)
- Transmission: 7-speed Magna 7DCL750 dual-clutch

Dimensions
- Wheelbase: 2,650 mm (104.3 in)
- Length: 4,611 mm (181.5 in)
- Width: 1,979 mm (77.9 in)
- Height: 1,206 mm (47.5 in)
- Curb weight: 1,435 kg (3,164 lb)

Chronology
- Predecessor: Ferrari 488
- Successor: Ferrari 296

The Ferrari F8 (Type F142MFL) is a mid-engine sports car that was produced by the Italian automobile manufacturer Ferrari from 2019 to 2023. The car is the successor to the Ferrari 488 and pays homage to the last 45 years of Ferrari’s mid-engine V8s. It was unveiled at the 2019 Geneva Motor Show.

== Models ==
=== F8 Tributo ===
==== Specifications and performance ====
The original model of the Ferrari F8 – the F8 Tributo – uses the same engine from the 488 Pista, a 3.9 L twin-turbocharged V8 engine with a power output of 530 kW; 710 hp (720 PS) at 8000 rpm and 770 N⋅m (568 lb⋅ft) of torque at 3250 rpm, making it the most powerful V8-powered Ferrari produced to date. The exhaust layout and the Inconel manifolds have been completely modified up to the terminals. The F8 Tributo utilizes rev sensors, originally developed for the 488 Challenge, to optimize turbocharger efficiency based on power demand from the pedal. It uses a 7-speed dual-clutch automatic transmission with enhanced gear ratios.

Several new software features are installed on the F8 which are controlled via the manettino dial on the steering wheel. The car is equipped with Ferrari's latest Side Slip Angle Control traction- and stability-control program. Additionally, the Ferrari Dynamic Enhancer, an electronic program for managing drifts, can now be used in the Race drive mode. Ferrari also stated that the Tributo's downforce has been increased by 15 percent as compared to the 488 GTB.

Ferrari claims the F8 Tributo can accelerate from 0–100 km/h (0–62 mph) in 2.9 seconds, 0–200 km/h (0–124 mph) in 7.6 seconds, and reach a top speed of 340 km/h (211 mph). Road & Track tested a US-spec Ferrari F8 Tributo model and achieved a 10.3-second quarter-mile time with a 132.8 mph (214 km/h) trap speed.

==== Aerodynamics ====
The car has quad tail lamps, a feature that was last seen in the V8 lineage on the F430. At the rear, it has a louvered clear engine cover made from lightweight Lexan.

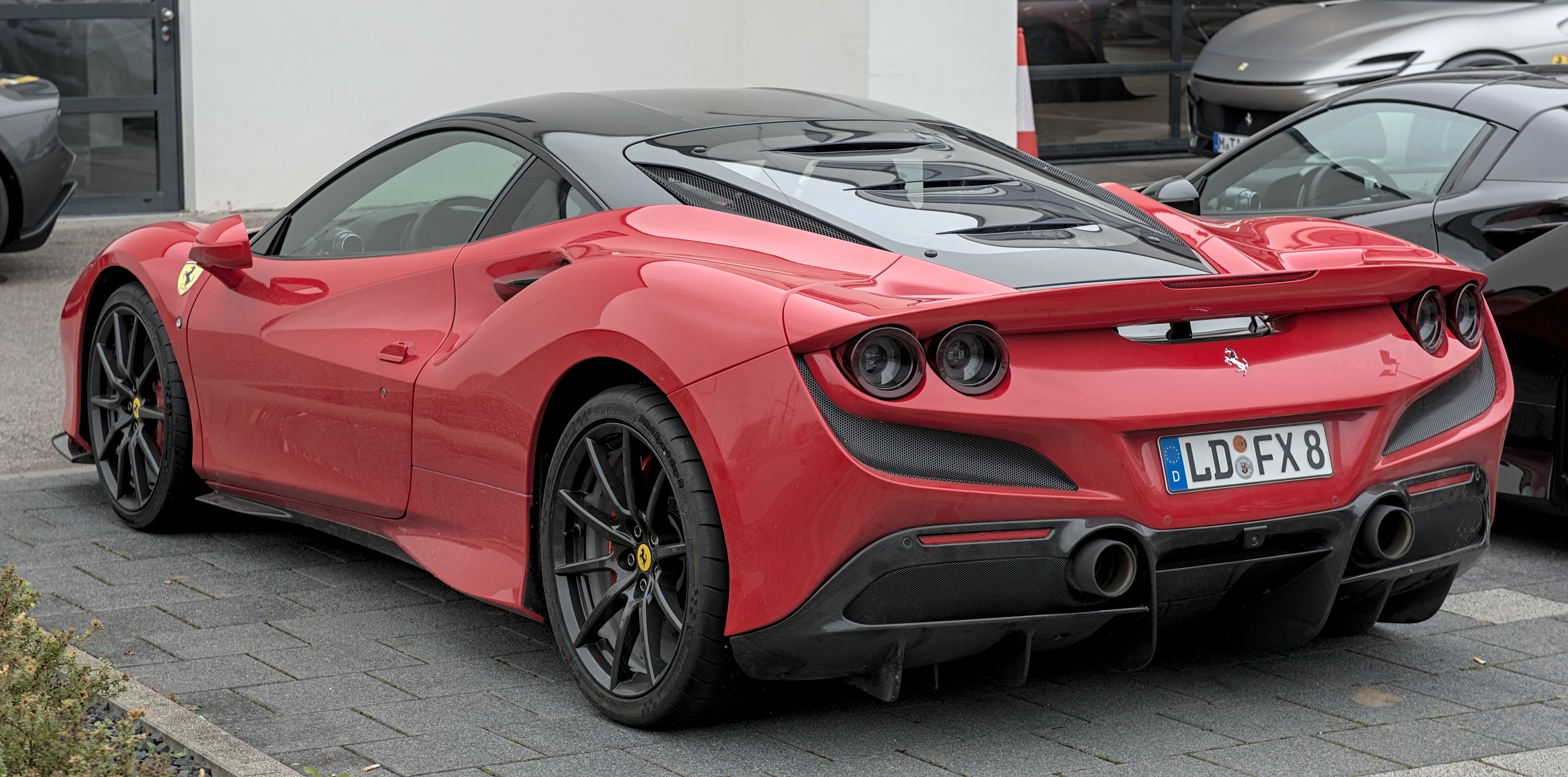
Rear view

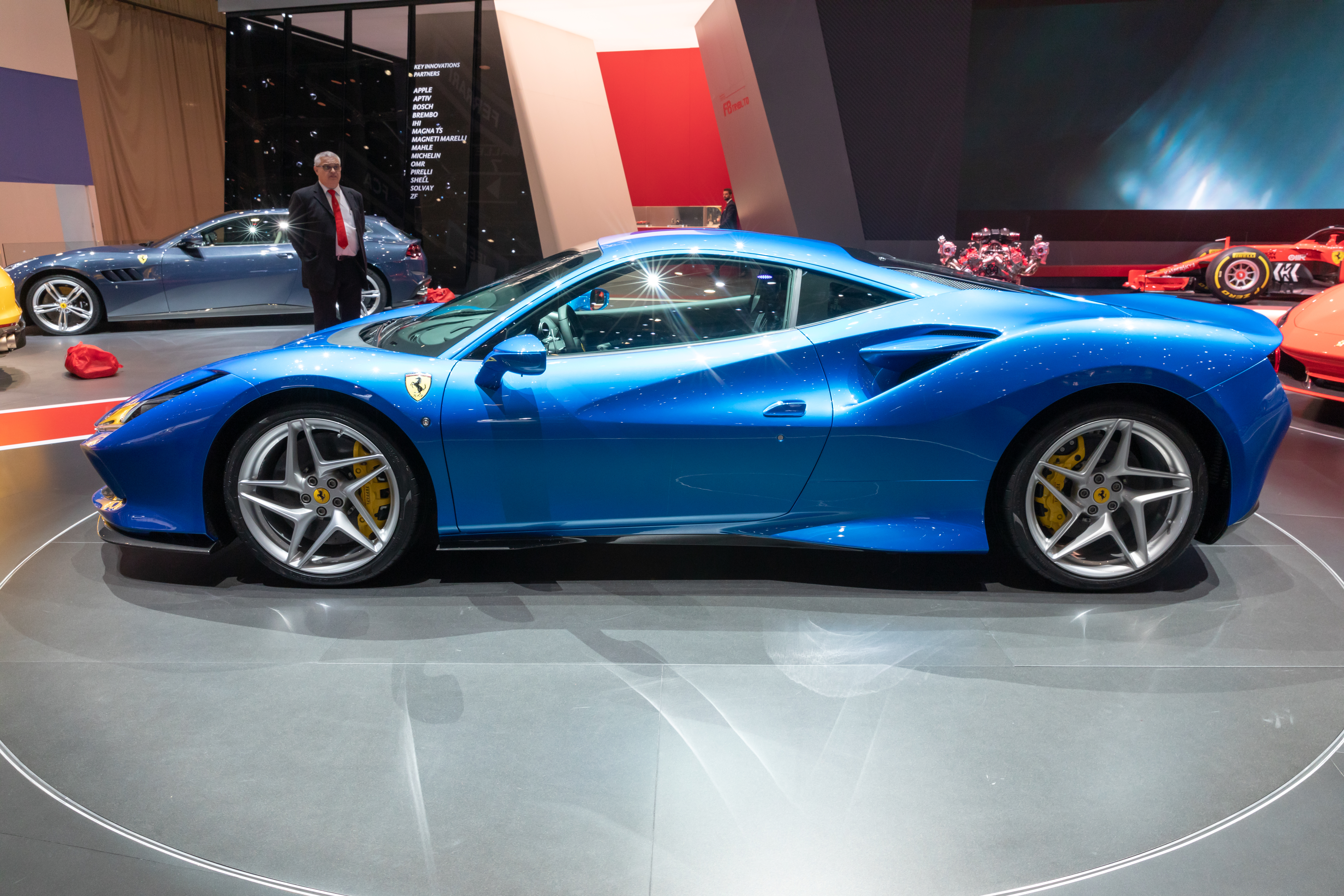
Side view

==== Interior ====
The interior has received updates as well: the dashboard, instrument housing, and door panels are new. The two-tone colour scheme seen on the 488 has also been replaced. An 220 mm (8.5 in) passenger touchscreen display is also optional as a part of the HMI (Human Machine Interface).

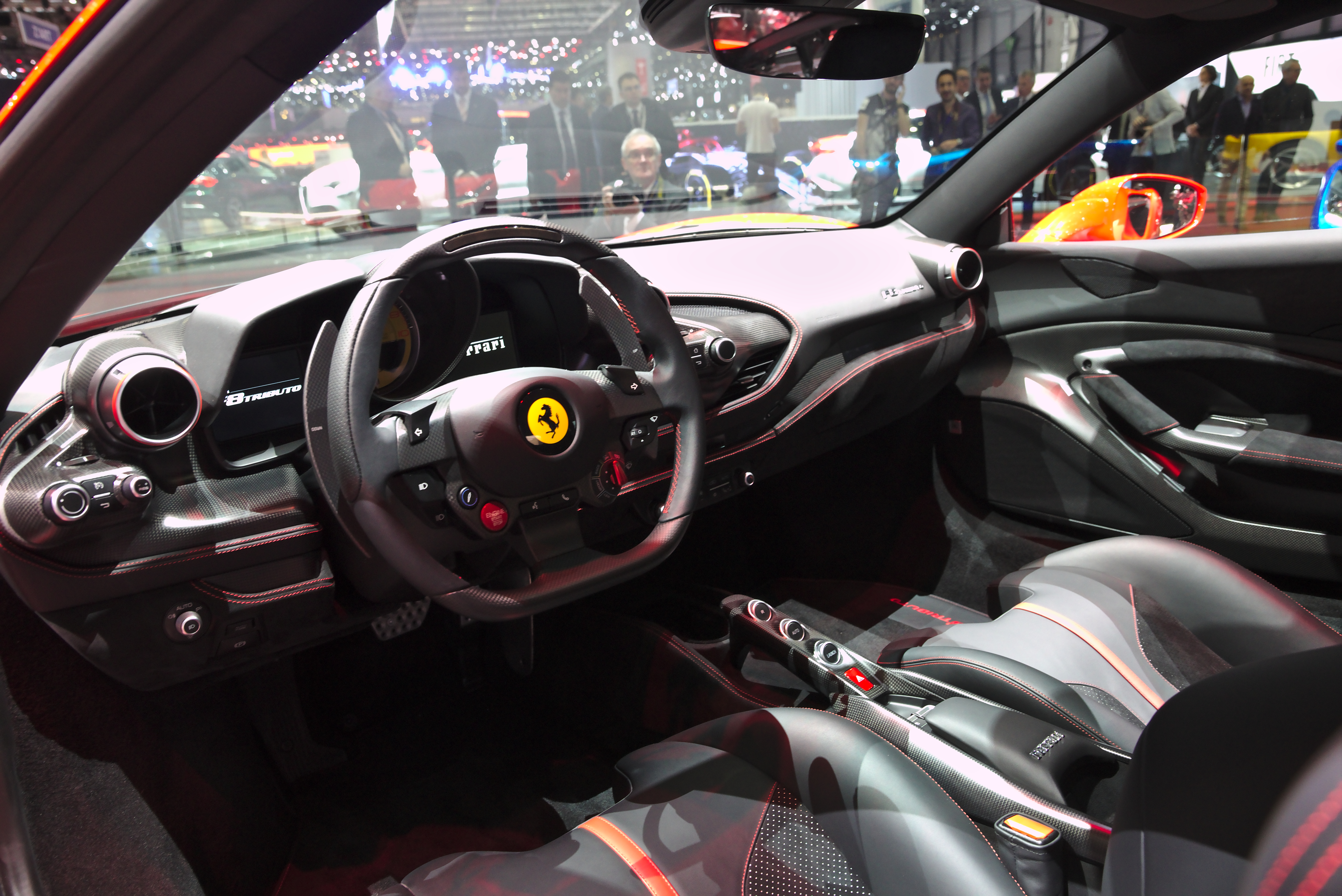
Interior

=== F8 Spider ===
The F8 Spider is an open-top variant of the F8 Tributo with a folding hardtop as seen on its predecessors. The top takes 14 seconds for operation and can be operated at speeds up to 45 km/h (28 mph).

The Spider's drivetrain is shared with the Tributo. Performance figures include acceleration from 0 - 100 km/h (62 mph) in 2.9 seconds and from 0 - 200 km/h (124 mph) in 8.2 seconds. Top speed is unchanged from the coupé at 340 km/h (211 mph). Dry weight of the Spider is 1,400 kg (3,086 lb). The boot capacity allows for 200 litres (7.1 cu ft) of luggage space.

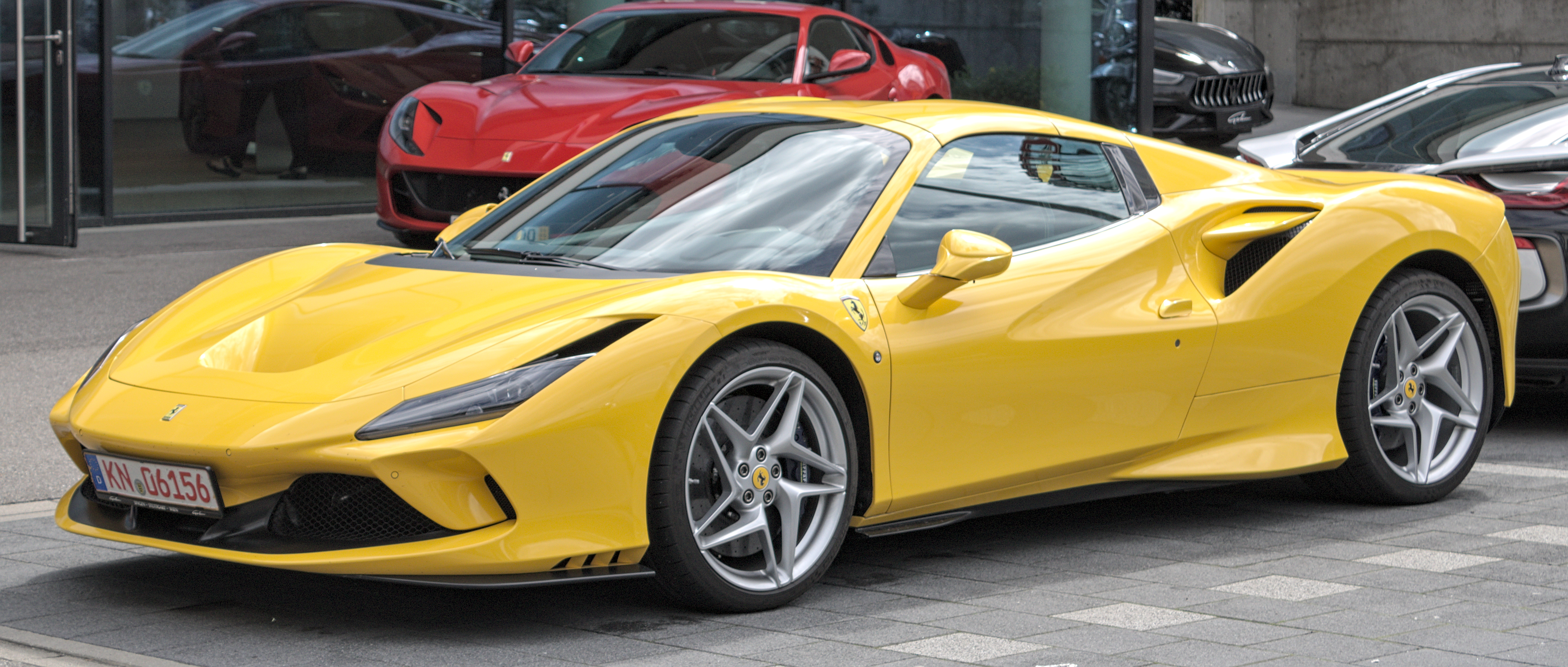
Ferrari F8 Spider

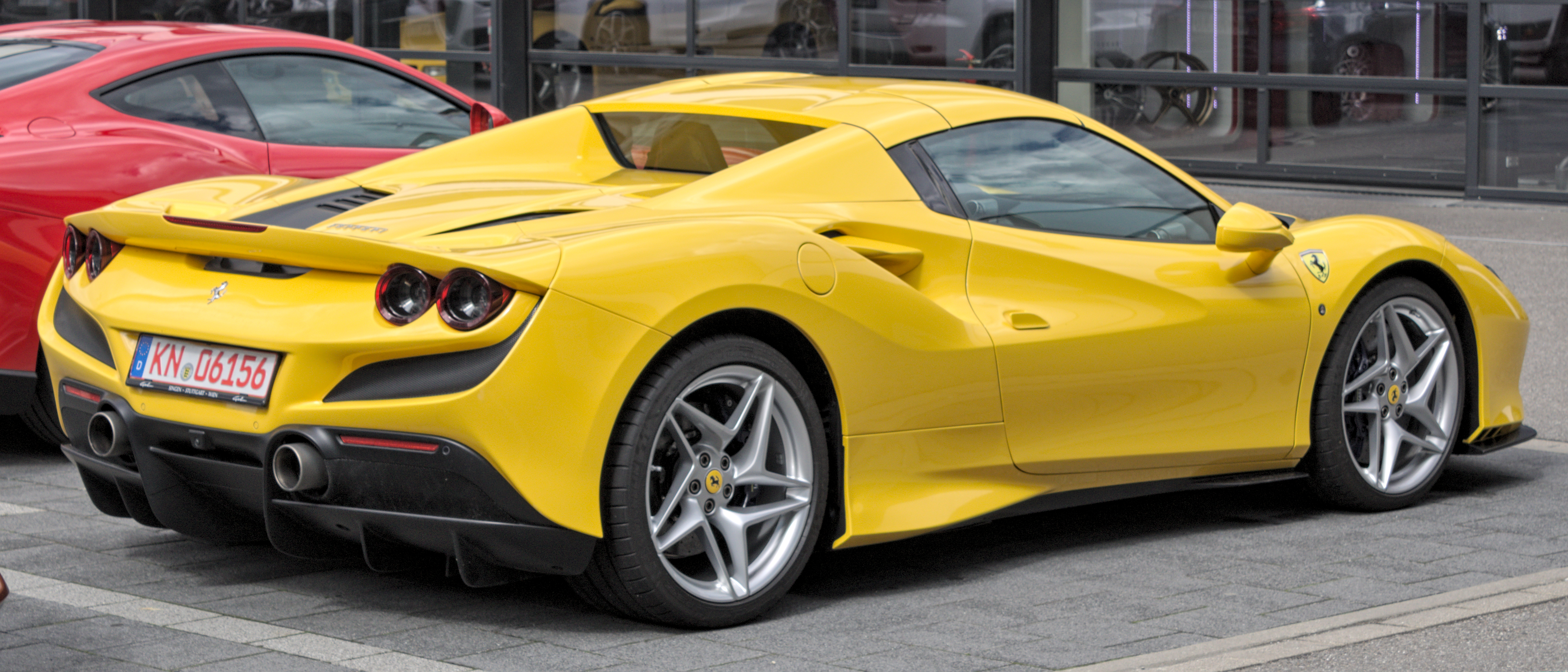
Rear view

== One-offs ==
=== SP48 Unica ===
SP48 Unica at the 2026 Pebble Beach Concours d'Elegance

The SP48 Unica is a one-off model based on the F8 Tributo. It features a redesigned body, with a windowless rear end, rectangular headlights and taillights, and a hexagon design motif throughout the exterior and interior.

=== SP-8 ===
SP-8 at the 2024 Goodwood Festival of Speed

The SP-8 is a one-off model based on the F8 Spider and built for a Taiwanese customer. It retains the F8 Spider's layout, chassis and engine, but adopts a roofless roadster body style. The headlights and front end are completely redesigned with a longer splitter. It has F40-inspired five-spoke alloy wheels; rear lights derived from the Roma and the windscreen and exhaust pipes “given the same treatment as the 296 GTB’s”. The front half of the car is painted in glossy iridescent Blue Sandstone carbon fiber, while the rear bodywork is finished in a matte Argento Micalizzato gray paint.

=== HC25 ===
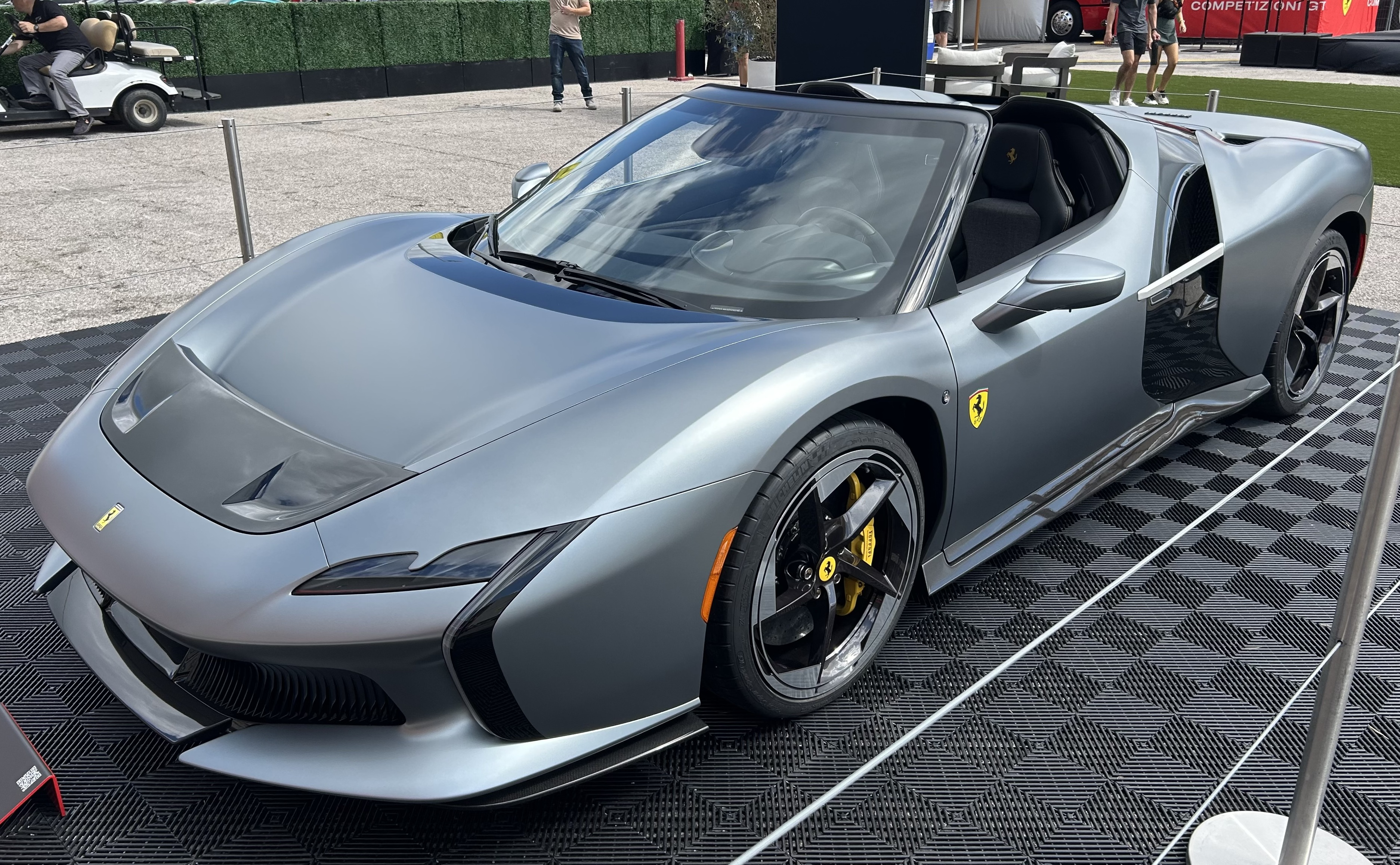
Ferrari HC25 at the Circuit of the Americas

The HC25 is a one-off model based on the F8 Spider, unveiled during Ferrari Racing Days at the Circuit of the Americas in 2026. It features a redesigned body, with a gloss-black band integrating the side air intakes and engine-bay heat extraction elements, slimmer bespoke headlamps with vertical daytime running lights, redesigned rear lighting, twin trapezoidal exhaust outlets, and yellow accents in the interior. Ferrari said the concept of the design was to "act as a bridge between the final mid-engined V8 Ferrari and recent models." The powertrain is unchanged from the standard F8 Spider.
