= Manettino dial =

Car part

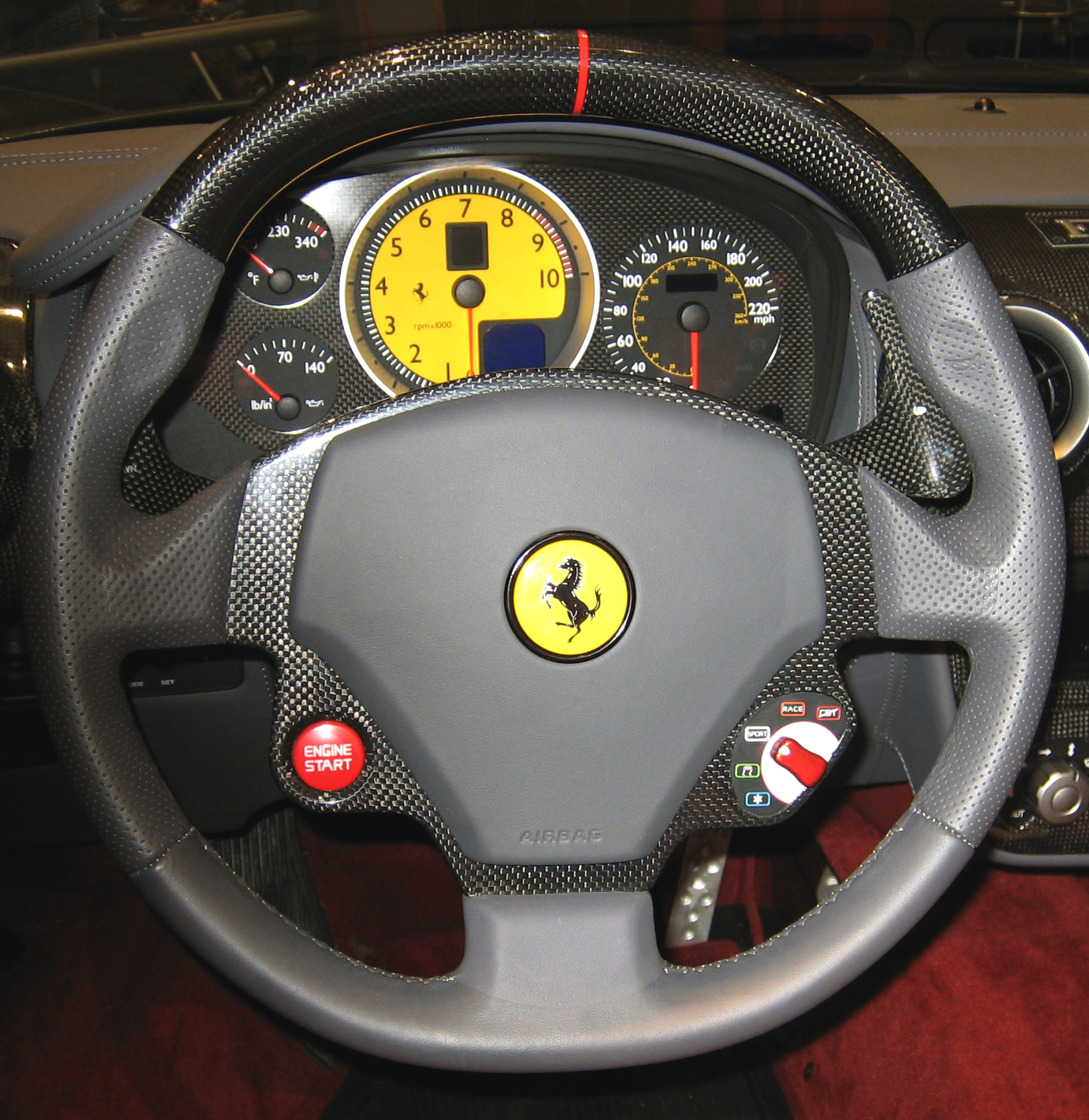
Ferrari F430 steering wheel with manettino switch

In automotive engineering, a manettino dial is a rotary switch part of some modern Ferrari cars first designed by Frank Stephenson, beginning with the Ferrari F430 in 2004. The adjustment dial is mounted on the steering wheel, usually just underneath the center of the wheel. The dial (Italian: manettino, lit. 'little lever') is inspired by the controls found on F1 steering wheels, but has a more polished appearance.

The dial allows for the quick and simple adjustment of the electronics governing car suspension settings, traction control, electronic differential, and change speed of electronic gearbox.

A similar control system was employed on the Ferrari Enzo, but with individual buttons for different settings rather than a single rotary switch.
