= Berlinetta =

Sports car

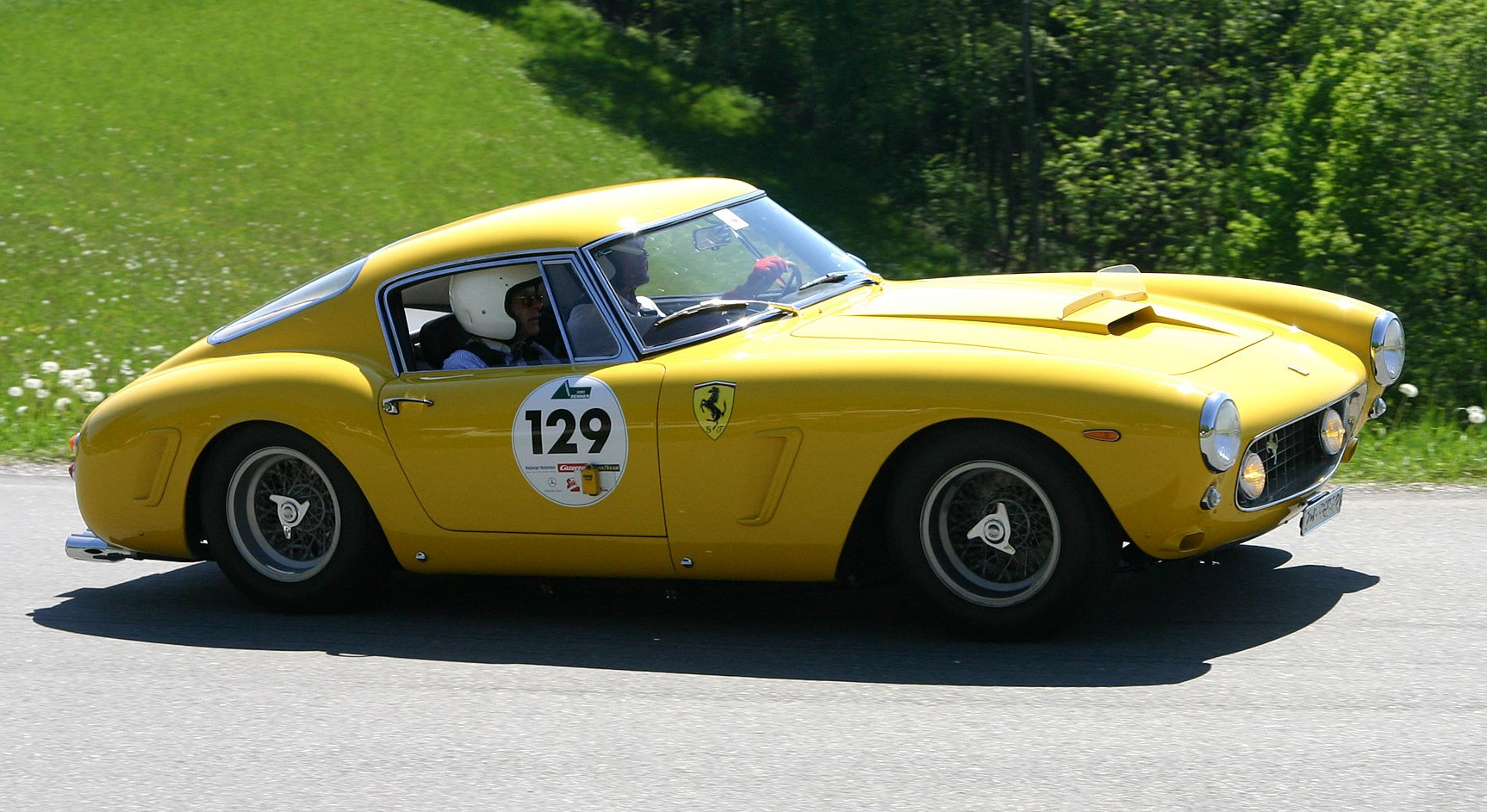
Ferrari 250GT Berlinetta SWB

A berlinetta (from Italian: berlinetta; Italian pronunciation: [berliˈnetta]) is a sports coupé, typically with two seats but also including 2+2 cars. The original meaning for berlinetta in Italian is “little saloon”, derived from the Berlin carriage. Introduced in the 1930s, the term was made popular by Ferrari in the 1950s. Maserati, Opel, Alfa Romeo, Volkswagen, and other European car manufacturers, as well as Chevrolet in the United States, have used berlinetta as model label.

== Berlinette ==
Berlinette is the French name for a Berlinetta, which is defined as a sporty, low-profile two-door type of automobile body style closely related to the coupé.

After World War II, the term came to refer to a small vehicle with enclosed coachwork similar to a two-door berline, or sedan in France. It supplanted use of the term "coach" for a similar but older body style, which had replaced the even older term "demi-berline".

The most common recent usage was in reference to the Alpine A110 sports car, which was often simply called "la Berlinette".
