= ATS 2500 GT =

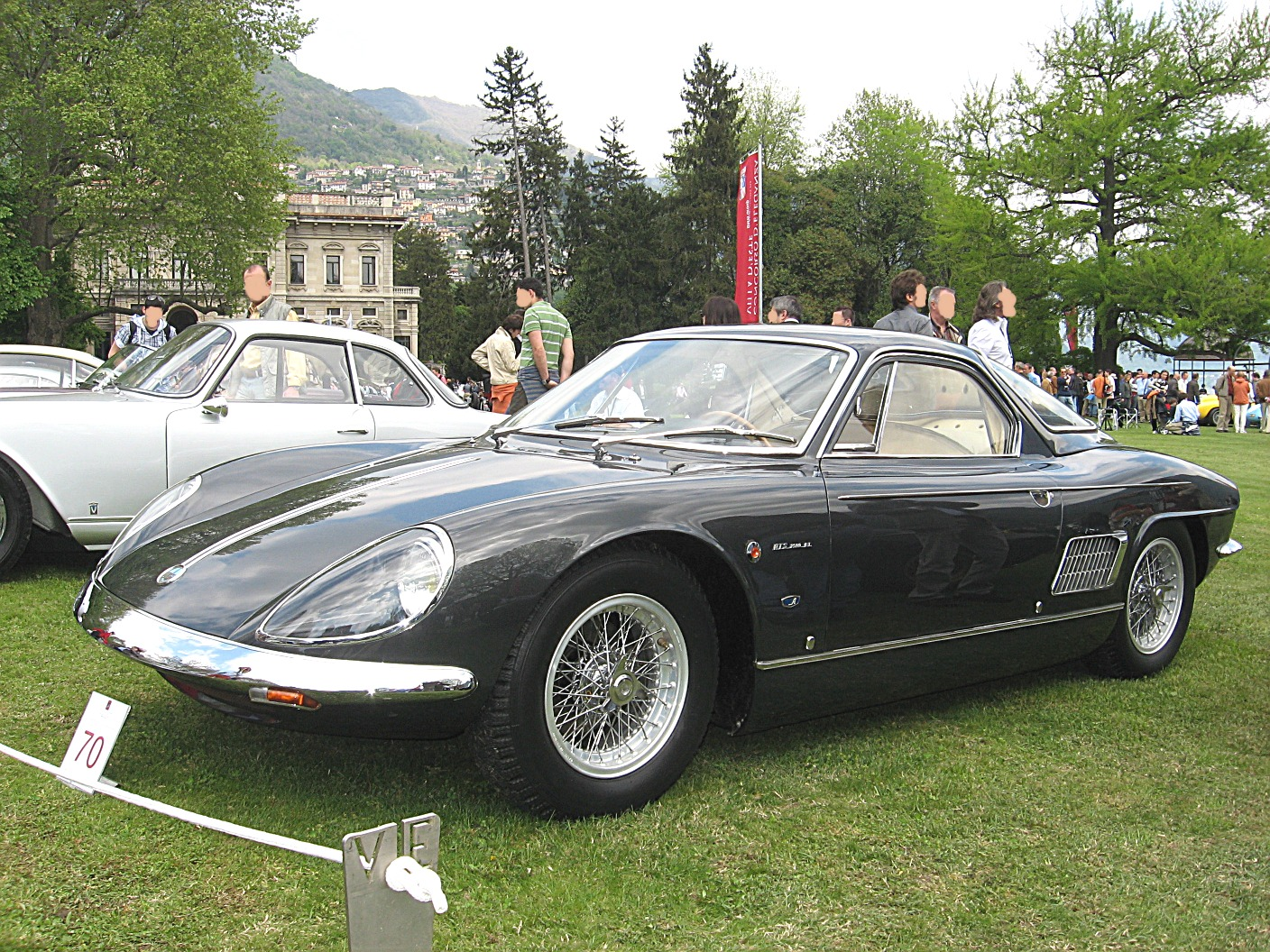

Overview
- Manufacturer: Automobili Turismo e Sport
- Production: 1963–1965; 12 produced
- Designer: Franco Scaglione at Carrozzeria Allemano

Body and chassis
- Class: Sports car
- Body style: 2-door coupe
- Layout: Rear mid-engine, rear-wheel-drive

Powertrain
- Engine: 2.5 L (2468 cc/150.6 cu in) 90° V8
- Transmission: 5 -speed manual

Dimensions
- Wheelbase: 2,502 mm (98.5 in)
- Length: 4,331 mm (170.5 in)
- Width: 1,613 mm (63.5 in)
- Height: 1,181 mm (46.5 in)

Chronology
- Successor: ATS GT (spiritual)

The ATS 2500 GT is a sports car made by Italian company Automobili Turismo e Sport in Bologna. It was the first Italian and one of the first GT or sports car in the world to have a mid-engine layout. The group behind the ATS project consisted mainly of Ferrari defectors: family troubles had created an uncomfortable working atmosphere for the personnel. ATS, intent on beating Ferrari on all fronts, also produced a Formula One car for 1963, "a ghastly mess, one of the most inept racing cars ever, and its appalling performances did not help the road car." Even noted driver Phil Hill was unable to provide ATS with any results on track.

== History ==
The space frame 2500 GT was introduced in 1963 at the Paris Motor Show. Designed by Franco Scaglione and engineered by Carlo Chiti and Giotto Bizzarrini, the car was built only in limited numbers before investors withdrew financial support and the project collapsed. The car's drawings were later used for Count Volpi's (an early backer) failed Serenissima sports-cars project. A Moreno Baldi attempted another revival of the ATS concept in 1970, and failed even more disastrously.

With its 220 CV (162 kW; 217 hp) (210 bhp according to some) and 255 N⋅m (188 ft⋅lb) of torque it was claimed to be capable of a 240 km/h (149 mph) top speed. A competition version (ATS 2500 GTS) produced 245 CV (180 kW; 242 hp) but never amounted to much. The coachwork was by Allemano, and the 5-speed transmission by Colotti.

== Revival effort ==
In 2012, there was an attempt to re-establish ATS. Digital images of a newly designed 2500 GT were shown, with a 2.5 L turbocharged flat-four engine (a Cosworth-tuned Subaru flat-four claimed to produce 500 hp). The car never entered production. in 2017, ATS announced another model, a spiritual successor to the original 2500 GT called the ATS GT. The new GT is based on the McLaren 12C and ATS had hopes to enter production in 2019.

ATS 2500 GT

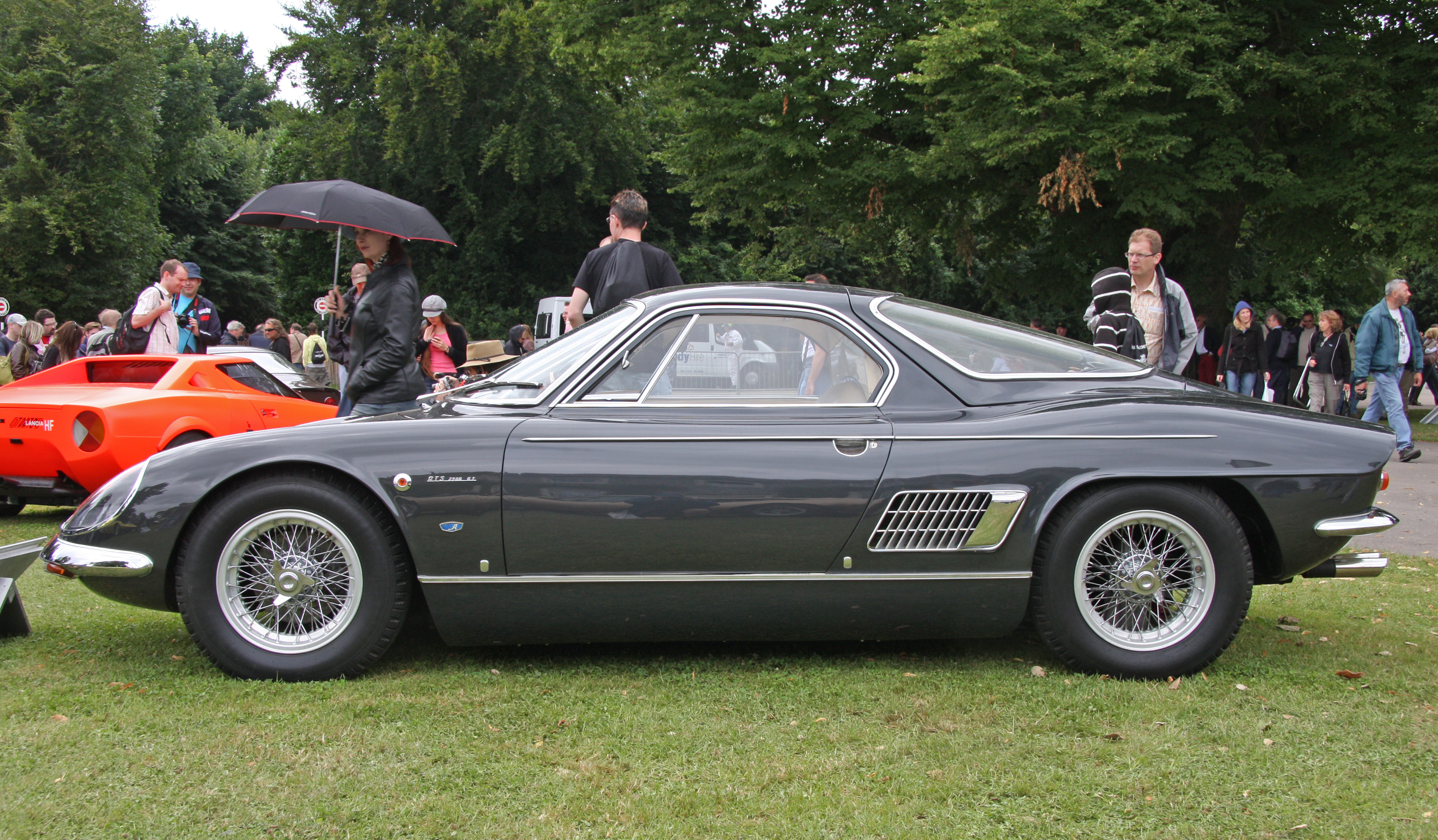
Side View

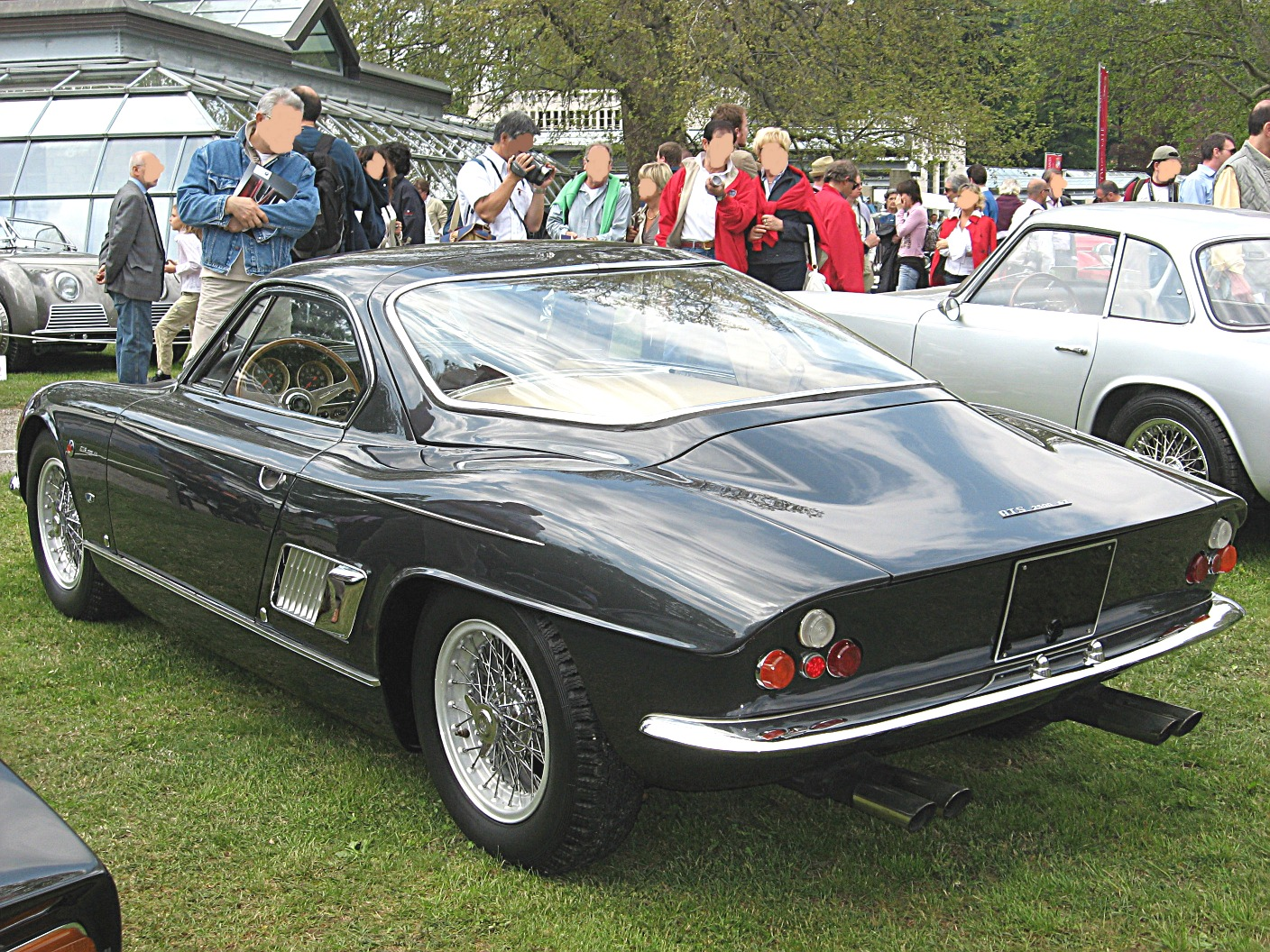
Rear

ATS 2500 GTS

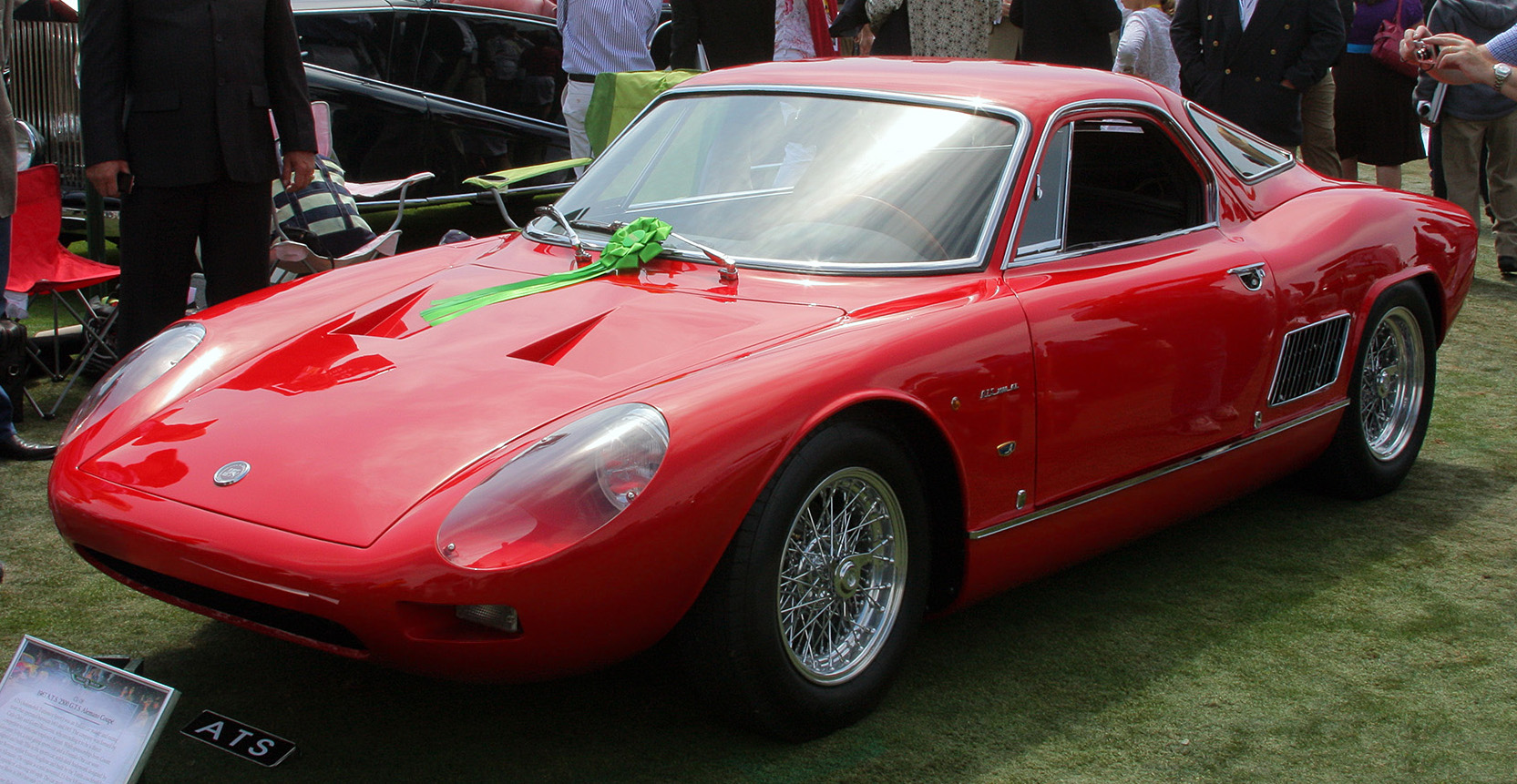
Front: Smoothed out nose, no bumper

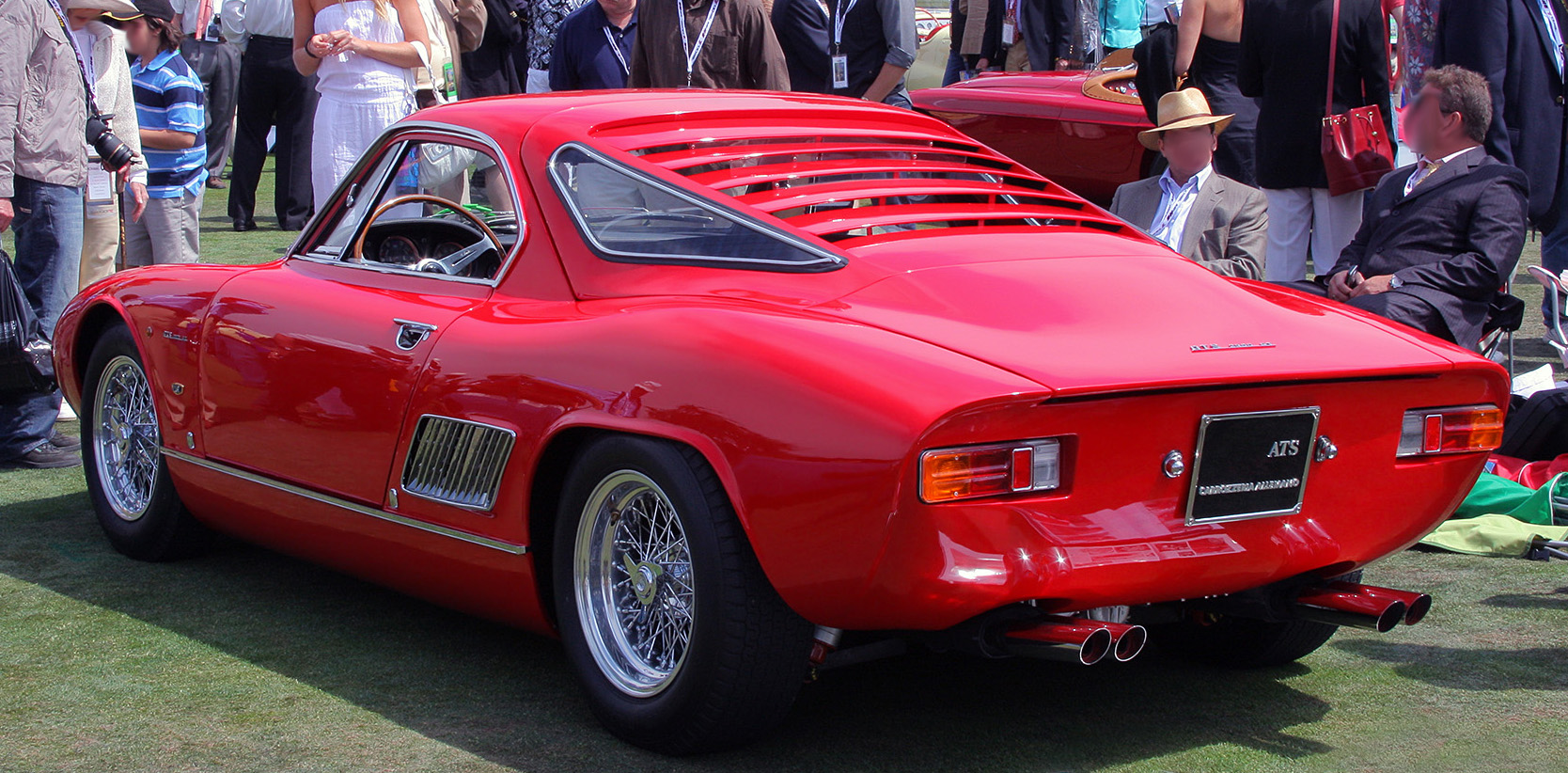
Rear: Louvres replace single-piece rear window of standard version

== Sources ==
- Mike Lawrence (1991). A to Z of Sports Cars. Bideford, Devon: Bay View Books. p. 38. ISBN 1-870979-81-8.
