= History of Ferrari =

History of the Ferrari car company

Ferrari is an Italian company which has produced sports cars since 1947, but traces its roots back to 1929 when Enzo Ferrari formed the Scuderia Ferrari racing team.

In January 2016, Ferrari officially split off from its former parent company Fiat Chrysler Automobiles.

== Early history ==
=== 1929–1937: Scuderia Ferrari ===
Enzo Ferrari decided to pursue racing in 1908, at the age of ten: to this end, he eventually began a career as a racing driver in 1919. During the 1920s he worked for Alfa Romeo, both as a driver in various local races and as an employee in its Milan sales depot. In 1929, though, he broke from this line of work to found and manage his own racing team, which he named Scuderia Ferrari. Conceived as an outfit for gentleman drivers and other amateurs, the team was founded through a million-lira loan from a local bank, with additional backing from the wealthy amateur racer Mario Tadini, Augusto and Alfredo Caniato — two brothers in the textile industry — and the tyre company Pirelli. It would be based out of Modena, Enzo's hometown.

Enzo quickly set about negotiating with Giorgio Rimini, Alfa Romeo's commercial director, and managed to secure a partnership between their respective companies. The intended arrangement was simple: Alfa Romeo would outfit their factory team, Alfa Corse, with its latest, most sophisticated cars, while Ferrari's scuderia ('stable') of amateurs would use lower-end cars and hand-me-downs from past seasons. Additionally, Ferrari would operate independently from Alfa Romeo, such that the automaker would be insulated from negative press whenever the team placed poorly. Enzo presented this as beneficial to everyone involved, as it allowed Alfa Romeo to stay active in racing with minimal effects on their other ventures. The team's first race was the 1930 Mille Miglia, using cars supplied by Alfa Romeo, and the first use of the Prancing Horse logo was at the 1932 24 Hours of Spa-Francorchamps.

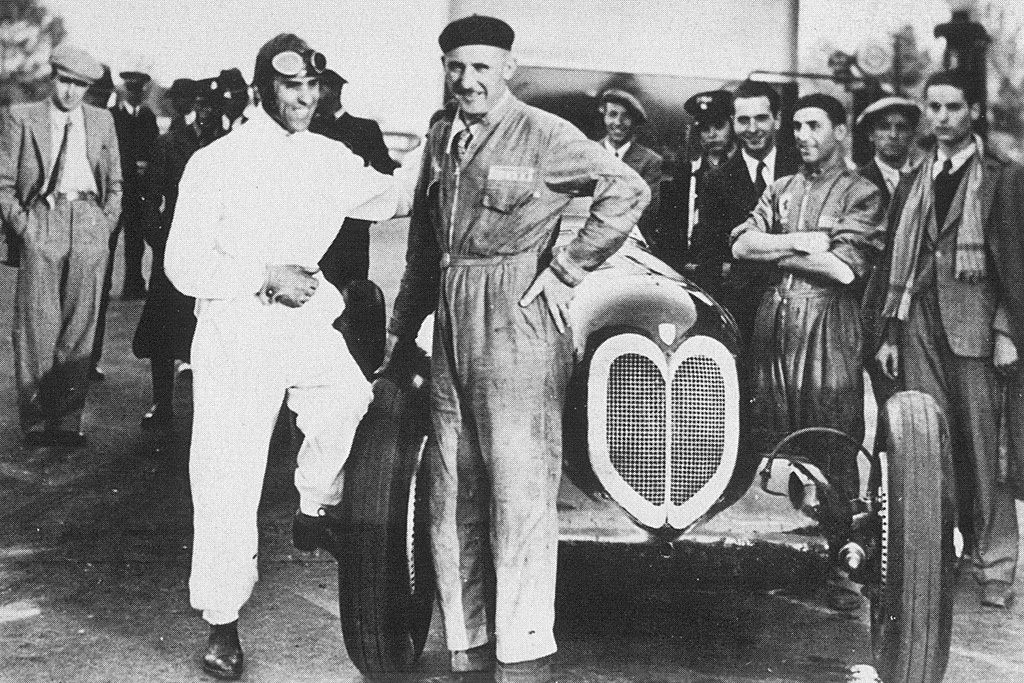
The Alfa Romeo Bimotore photographed during a land speed record attempt, alongside its engineer Luigi Bazzi (right) and driver Tazio Nuvolari (left).

This initial arrangement did not last. After Alfa Romeo came under the control of the Italian state in 1933, their racing division was downsized, and Scuderia Ferrari functioned as the unofficial company team throughout the mid-1930s. Leading up to the 1934 Grand Prix season, Ferrari began conducting their own research and development while Alfa Romeo continued to supply racing cars, a situation that led to vehicles being engineered within Ferrari themselves. These include a streamlined variant of the Type B optimised for AVUS, and the Bimotore, also based on the Type B, which was driven by two engines at once: one in front of the driver and another behind, each driving the rear wheels through a special split differential. These "first Ferraris" tended to be ad hoc and relatively primitive, as Alfa Romeo was facing rough financial outcomes with negligible support from the Italian government. During its heyday, the Scuderia Ferrari of the 1930s employed several notable figures including Vittorio Jano, who served as the team's chief designer, and drivers such as Antonio Ascari, Giuseppe Campari, and Tazio Nuvolari.

==== Motorcycle racing ====
From 1932 to 1935 Scuderia Ferrari also operated a motorcycle racing division, which was conceived as a way to scout and train future Grand Prix drivers. Instead of Italian motorcycles, the team used British ones manufactured by Norton and Rudge. Though Ferrari was successful on two wheels, winning three national titles and 44 overall victories, it was eventually pushed out of the discipline both by the obsolescence of pushrod motorcycle engines and broader economic troubles stemming from the Great Depression.

=== 1938–1945: Auto Avio Costruzioni ===
In their early years, Scuderia Ferrari enjoyed considerable independence from Alfa Romeo, owing both to their loose partnership and the physical distance between Modena and Alfa Romeo's facilities in Milan. In 1937, though, Alfa Romeo began to reconsider this inefficient state of affairs, and at the end of the year they purchased 80% of Scuderia Ferrari's shares, absorbing it into the company. Enzo remained the team's manager until a restructuring in 1939, in which he was laid off. After this, he used his capital — sourced from his savings, a hefty settlement, and the sale of his team two years prior — to start his own automotive company, Auto Avio Costruzioni. Ferrari's new company, the direct predecessor of the contemporary Ferrari S.p.A., could not be branded by his surname for another four years due to a noncompete agreement he had reached with Alfa Romeo.

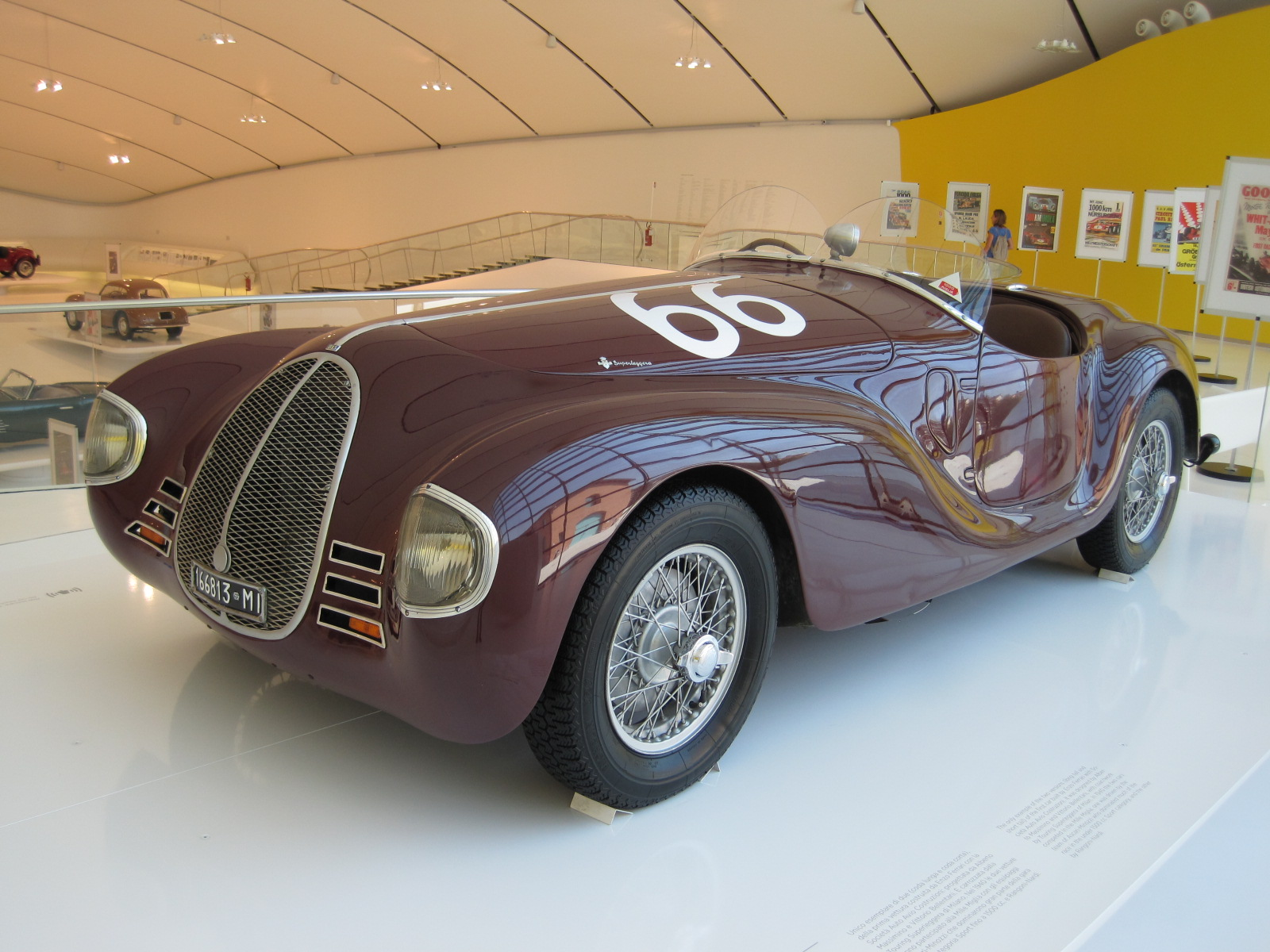
The single remaining Auto Avio Costruzioni 815. Produced after Ferrari's departure from Alfa Romeo, the car was made mostly from Fiat components.

The company produced only a single car: the Auto Avio Costruzioni 815, both examples of which failed to complete their inaugural race. Racing opportunities dried up after Italy entered World War II in 1940, and the company was mobilised for wartime production in 1941; it was not down on its luck, though, as it received lucrative contracts to manufacture military hardware. The most valuable of these contracts was for grinding machines under licence from the German company Jung, used to manufacture precision components, particularly ball bearings. Enzo Ferrari had a strained relationship with the Germans, who asserted he was never granted permission to manufacture Jung's machines, and an ambivalent one with the Italian resistance movement, which distrusted him due to his ties with the National Fascist Party. Enzo appeased the resistance through various means, such as by safeguarding money belonging to the Italian Communist Party, and through a friend's payment of a 500,000-lira ransom targeted at him.

The war had other effects on the company as well: in order to avoid the Allied bombing campaigns occurring throughout Italy at the time, Ferrari moved his factory from Modena to Maranello in 1943. Though the new plant was still bombed twice, once in November 1944 and again in February of 1945, Ferrari remains in Maranello to this day. The company primarily made grinding machines only after moving to Maranello, while in Modena they mostly focused on producing aircraft engines. Though he could not build any cars, Enzo continued to conceptualise new racing car designs throughout the war.

In 1945, Auto Avio Costruzioni was renamed Auto Costruzioni Ferrari. The change in name reflected Enzo's desire to fully break out into the automotive industry: "I had had ambitious plans for launching out into the manufacture of high-quality cars," he once said. "I remembered that I had joined Alfa Romeo when they were endeavouring to produce one car a day, and I too had hopes of achieving this same target."

== 1946–1959: The beginning ==
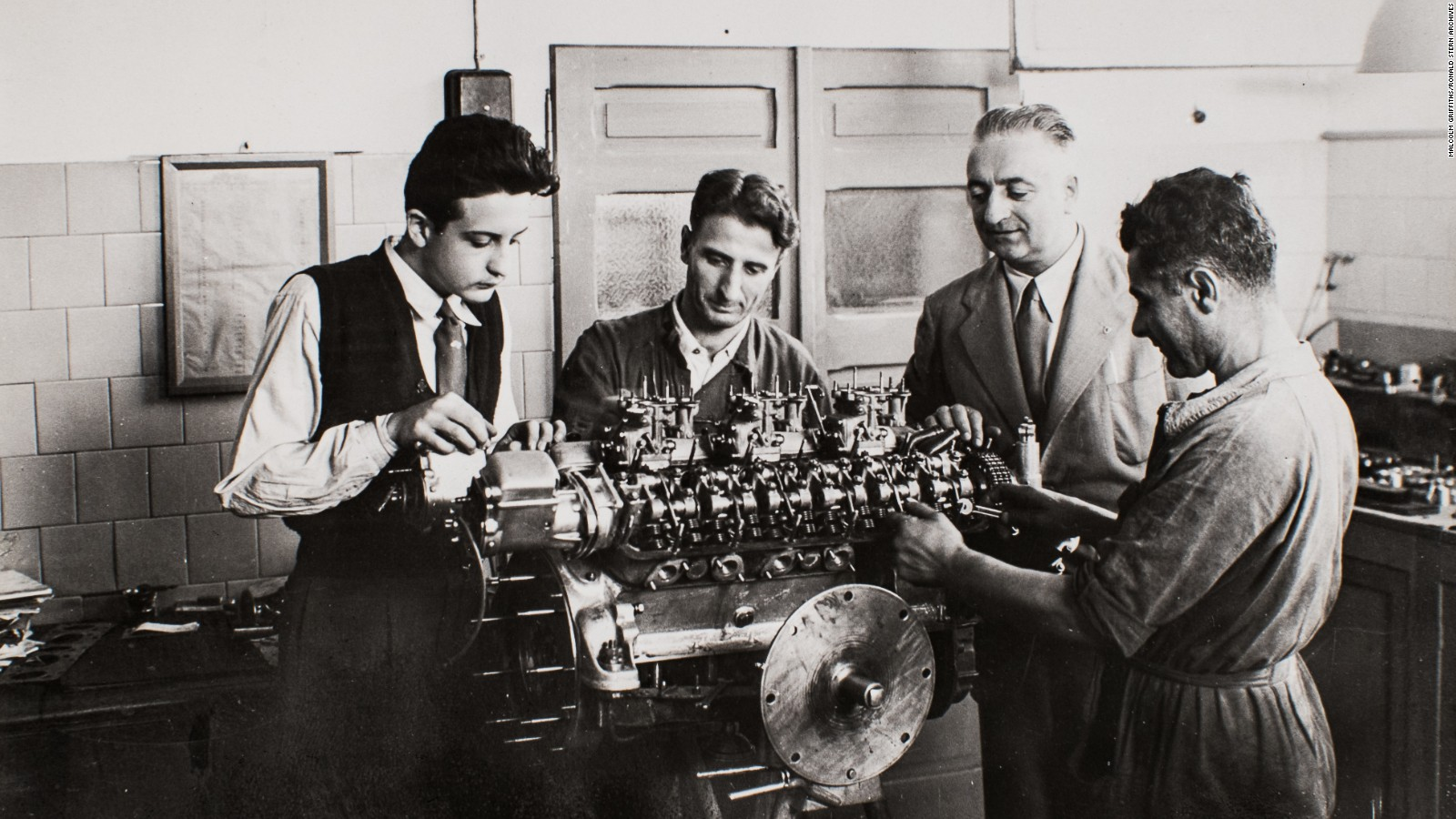
Enzo and Alfredo Ferrari, along with a pair of engineers, inspecting what is likely an early Colombo V12.

In all, World War II was good for Ferrari, as the associated military contracts allowed the company to raise significant capital for postwar automotive production. It would continue to produce grinding machines, its most lucrative wartime contract, into the late 1940s in order to finance its racing operations.

Gioacchino Colombo, an engineer on hiatus from Alfa Romeo, was tasked with designing a new Ferrari engine from the ground up. Enzo specified that it would follow a V12 configuration: this was both because the design could be applied to both sports cars and Grand Prix racing with minimal modification, and because he was personally impressed by the V12 designs previously produced by Auto Union, Delage, Packard, and Alfa Romeo. He was also simply passionate about V12 engines: he recalled thinking about the layout as early as 1925, and he considered their sound to be "the Italian interpretation of refined engineering." Enzo's co-workers and rivals considered his fixation on V12s to be irrational, and he was ridiculed for his choice. The resulting engine, commonly called the Colombo engine after its designer, was highly versatile: it would be used in various Ferrari models until 1988, by that point having tripled its displacement and nearly quadrupled its power output.

Enzo also met with Luigi Chinetti that year, who convinced him of the potential value of selling his cars in the United States. Chinetti, who had been selling European racing cars since the 1920s, believed that the United States' dynamic economy could sustain Ferrari's racing aspirations far better than war-torn Europe. Enzo concurred, and on 24 December 1946 he made Chinetti his official North American importer. Ferrari vehicles were shipped to the United States, which was to become one of the automaker's primary markets, as early as 1949.

=== 125 S: the first Ferrari ===
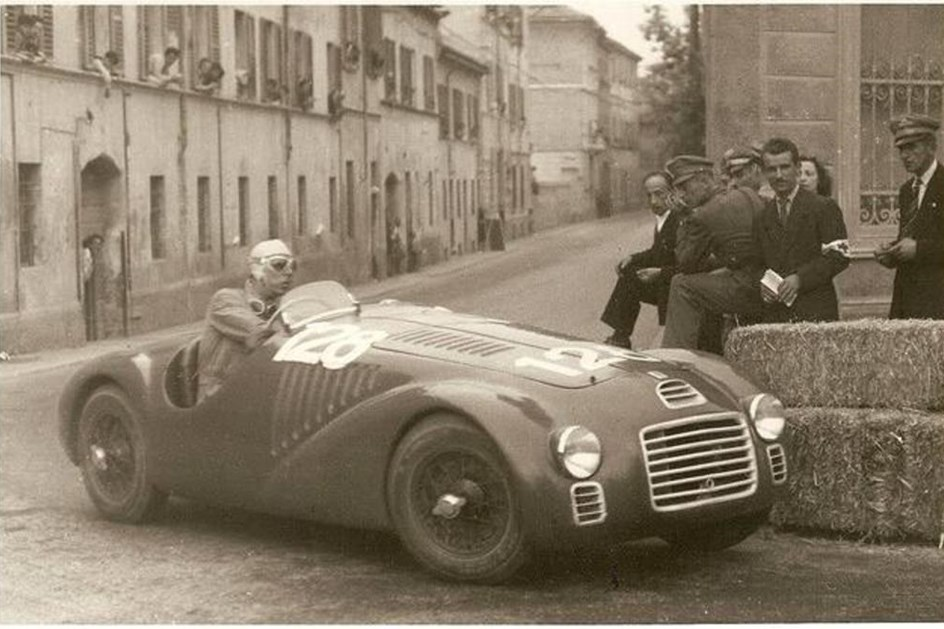
The Ferrari 125 S, the first Ferrari sports car, at its debut race in Piacenza.

The first Ferrari sports car, as well as the first car to use Colombo's new engine, was the 1947 125 S. Purpose-built for sports car racing, it achieved the company's first victory at the 1947 Grand Prix of Rome, where it was driven by Franco Cortese. Of the ten races the car entered, it won six, placed second in one, and retired from three. Cortese remarked that compared to his competition, the 125 S "was a more modern machine, indeed exceptional for those days." Ferrari itself tends to cast the 125 S's production as the starting point of its history, marking 1947 as its founding date during its anniversary celebrations.

The 125 S was developed alongside the 125 F1, first raced for the 1948 Grand Prix season. The open-wheel racer's engine was identical to the 125 S's except that, in keeping with regulations, it was fitted with a single-stage supercharger. It was first raced at the 1948 Italian Grand Prix, where its encouraging performance convinced Enzo to continue the company's costly Grand Prix racing programme.

=== Subsequent Ferrari models ===
Soon after debuting the 125 S, Ferrari produced many other sports cars in a variety of body styles. Until the late 1960s all of the company's road car models shared a characteristic layout, a front-engine design driven by a V12 engine. Enzo had a strong personal preference for this layout, arguing in later years that the size and weight of a typical Ferrari V12 made it difficult to place anywhere else in the car.

In the earliest years of Ferrari's production, the difference between its racing and road models was very small; one author claims that it is so scant as to be "strictly a matter of interpretation," and that even the more well-appointed cars were impractical to drive on the road. The 166 Inter, the company's first grand tourer, was a step away from the earlier, dual-purpose sports cars exemplified by the 159 S and 166 S. It was followed by the 195 Inter and 212 Inter, the engine inside growing progressively larger. The Inter cars collected a not insignificant track record through both factory-backed and privateer entries.

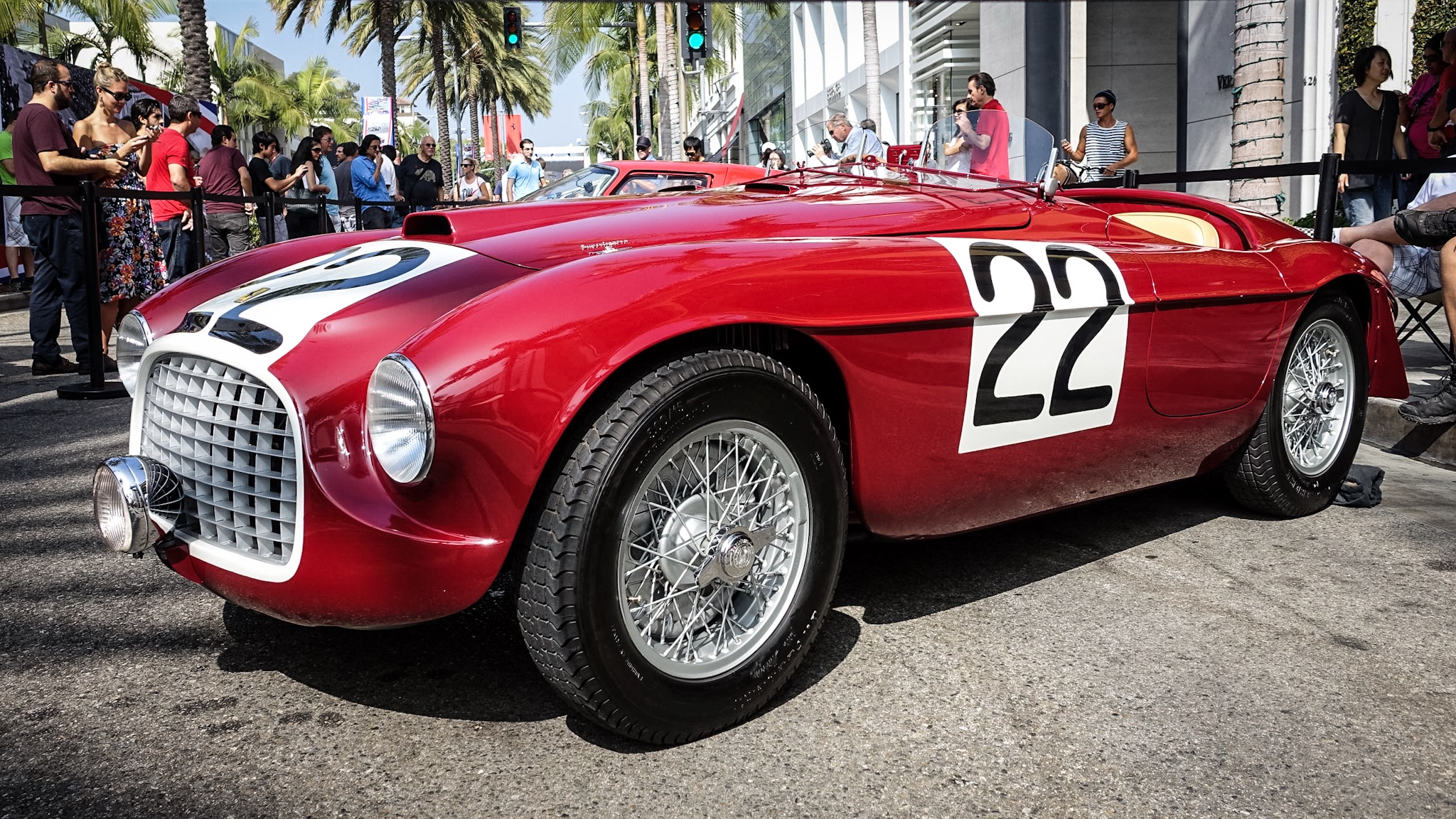
The 166 MM barchetta which, driven by Lord Selsdon and Luigi Chinetti, won the 1949 24 Hours of Le Mans. This was the first Ferrari ever to win the event.

The 166 MM was the 166 Inter's racing-oriented sibling. Though it was made in other styles, the car is perhaps most recognizable in its barchetta configuration, bodied by Carrozzeria Touring. The 166 MM barchetta was a capable racing machine — in 1949 it won the 24 Hours of Le Mans, Targa Florio, and Spa 24 Hours — and the car's racing cachet helped build Ferrari's reputation very early in its history. The nickname barchetta, meaning 'little boat,' calls attention to the chassis's superleggera strengthening ribs, which grant the car a boat-like shape; the name was first used at the 1948 Turin Auto Show, likely applied by a journalist. In 2005, Motor Trend Classic placed the 166 MM barchetta sixth in their list of the ten "greatest Ferraris of all time."

The America series of grand touring cars began production in 1950, starting with the 340 America racing model. Enzo intended for the new car to compete against racers with high-displacement American engines: to this end, it was fitted with a 4.1-litre iteration of the company's new Lampredi engine, originally designed for Formula One. A road variant, the 342 America, was produced just one year later; the new car, intended for elite customers with negligible interest in racing, featured new bodywork and a detuned engine. Subsequent Americas followed in the 342's lead as luxurious grand tourers. The America series used the Lampredi engine until 1959, which in the process grew to a displacement of 5 litres.

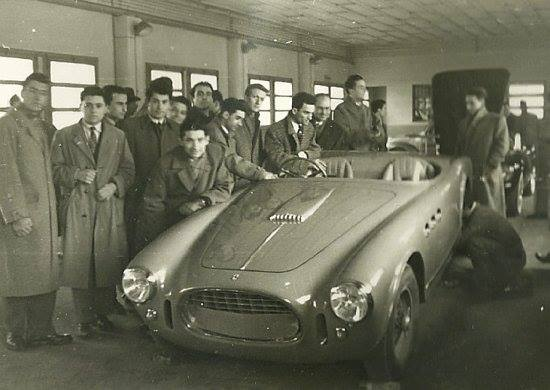
A Vignale-bodied 340 America Spyder at the factory in Maranello.

By 1953, Enzo, having grown tired of small-scale sales, hoped to expand and standardise the production of his road cars. The fruition of this wish was the highly prolific 250 series. The 250s, named after their 3-litre Colombo engine, were introduced in the midst of the company's transition from hand-built to series-produced vehicles: though the idea of a mass-produced Ferrari could be traced back to the 1953 250 Europa, the 250 GT Coupé became the first series-produced Ferrari in 1958, following an expansion of Pinin Farina's production facilities. The 250 series was sold in an expansive array of body styles, including the US-oriented California Spyder, a tighter-handling short wheelbase version, and convertible iterations of the coupé body style. Racing-oriented 250s were extensively used throughout the 1950s and 1960s, many of them special variants of road cars, and several examples, such as the 250 Testa Rossa and 250 Tour de France, are known for their success on the track.

=== Early racing success ===
The successful sale of these cars hinged on Ferrari's ability to win races, and Ferrari won many. Within just a few months, Ferrari had scored so many victories that "it seemed like it had always been involved in racing." In 1952 Ferrari won its first Formula One season, filling the vacuum left by Alfa Romeo's departure from the series, and by 1957, just ten years after beginning to race, Ferrari had taken home three Formula One World Championships, three World Sportscar Championships, seven victories in the Mille Miglia, and two victories at the 24 Hours of Le Mans. The drivers behind these victories were equally impressive: in 1949, a 47-year-old Luigi Chinetti became Le Mans' oldest champion to date after racing for 23 full hours, and later, between the 1952 and 1953 Belgian Grands Prix, Alberto Ascari placed first in every single Formula One race. Ascari's winning ratio — just over 40 percent — is the second highest in Formula One history.

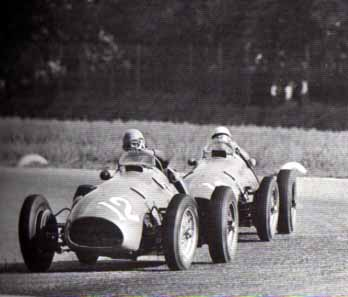
Ascari and Villoresi at the 1952 Italian Grand Prix, both driving Ferrari Tipo 500s.

One of the more important races for the company's future was the 1951 Carrera Panamericana, a grueling transcontinental endurance race straddling Mexico's new highway system. Ferrari's entries, two 212 Inters, achieved a 1–2 finish with the help of four drivers: Piero Taruffi and Luigi Chinetti finished first in a Vignale 212 Inter coupé, while Alberto Ascari and Luigi Villoresi placed second in a similar car. Within the United States, which was to become Ferrari's largest market, the company's top performance at the Carrera solidified its reputation as a producer of pedigreed sports cars. This was a goal which race driver Luigi Chinetti had been working towards for half a decade: an immigrant to the United States, he had been Ferrari's official North American agent since 1946. Chinetti established the first US Ferrari dealership, Luigi Chinetti Motors, in 1947; he imported his first Ferrari for US sale in 1949, and managed other vehicle sales perhaps as early as 1948. After the victory in Mexico he leveraged Ferrari's fame to scout out new buyers: he imported 212s and Americas to the US with success, and sold three 375 F1 formula cars to participants in the 1952 Indianapolis 500. By 1960, 40 percent of all Ferrari vehicles were exported to North America.

Later in the 1950s, (Note: It is unclear when exactly NART was formed, except that it happened sometime before 1959.) Chinetti would also found the North American Racing Team (NART). NART operated as a privateer team, independent from Ferrari, and grew out of driver arrangements Chinetti had been managing since 1951. In its early days, the team aimed to place wealthy amateurs, not necessarily with much driving experience, into prestigious racing events; NART's two largest initial backers, the socialites George Arents Jr. and Jan de Vroom, were very much of this stripe. Chinetti's racing operations gained credibility in the wake of the 1957 Cuban Grand Prix, when a strike among New York City's stevedores prevented several contestants' cars from being unloaded. Chinetti promptly provided replacement cars for the event, which were shipped directly to Havana via aeroplane. Thanks to Chinetti's special relationship with Ferrari, by the 1960s his team was attracting a slew of famous, storied drivers.

==== Genesis of Dino ====
Enzo's son, Alfredo "Dino" Ferrari, worked for a short but pivotal period for the company. Before dying of Duchenne muscular dystrophy at the age of 24, Alfredo helped design the 750 Monza and a new Formula Two-ready V6 engine. After Alfredo died, Vittorio Jano would ultimately finish his engine design, resulting in the Dino engine, bearing his name in his honour. Also named after Alfredo was the new Dino marque: first applied in 1957, two years after Alfredo's death, to the Dino 156 F2 open-wheel car, in the 1960s the name would come to be applied to a line of lower-priced Ferraris produced in cooperation with Fiat.

==== Driver and bystander deaths ====
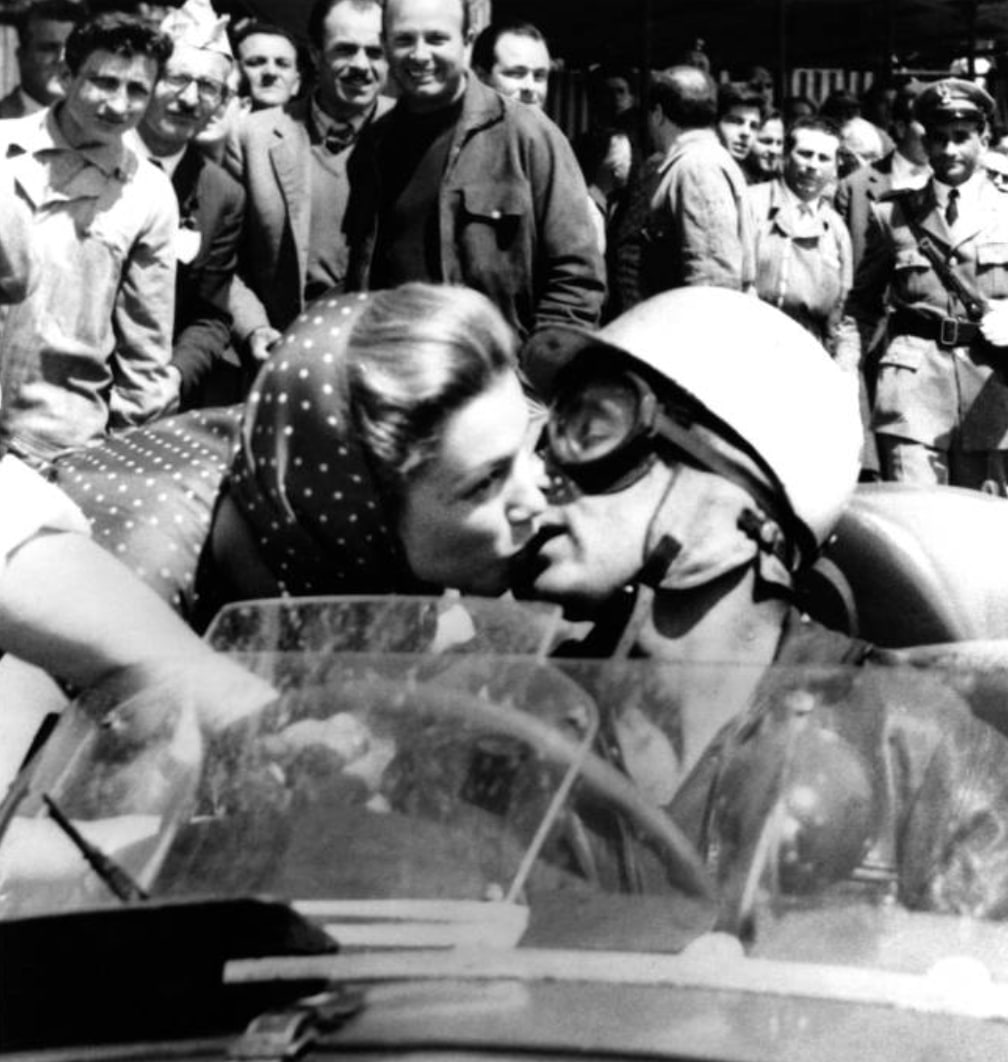
The Kiss of Death, a photograph taken moments before Portago's passing, documents him exchanging a kiss with the actress Linda Christian.

Some things surrounding Ferrari's racing program were less than savoury, however: in the second half of the 1950s, Scuderia Ferrari would witness a string of fatal crashes. Alberto Ascari was driving for Lancia in F1 but was killed while testing a Ferrari sportscar. Drivers killed in Ferraris also were Eugenio Castellotti, Alfonso de Portago, Luigi Musso, Peter Collins, and Wolfgang von Trips in following years. The public was especially roused by Portago's death at the 1957 Mille Miglia, which accompanied a disaster that killed nine spectators, five of them children. Protestors surrounded Ferrari's factory, and Enzo was called to stand trial for manslaughter; the court soon acquitted him, as the race's high spectator count and lack of crowd control made it highly unsafe. Von Trips's death four years later was accompanied by a similar disaster, where fifteen were killed. When faced with these accidents, Enzo appeared more interested in his cars than in the people they had killed, and his team took to salvaging spare parts from their remains. L'Osservatore Romano once compared him to the ancient Roman god Saturn, who ate his own children in order to retain his power.

=== Coachbuilding partnerships ===
Early in its history, Ferrari had no strong preference for any coachbuilder: after a chassis was finished in Maranello, it would be sent, per the buyer's request, to one of many local firms. The Ferraris of the 1940s and 1950s had bodies fabricated by the likes of Ghia, Bertone, Vignale, Touring, and Boano. Two vehicles that were mechanically identical, but bodied by different coachbuilders, could look strikingly dissimilar.

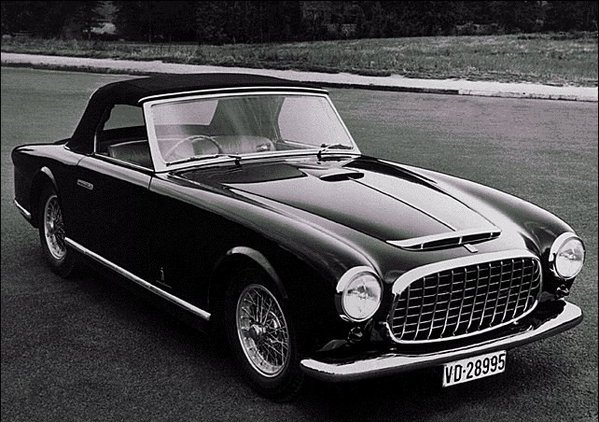
The 212 Inter was the first Ferrari ever bodied by Pininfarina.

As Ferrari grew, Enzo became dissatisfied with this haphazard approach: he was concerned that his cars looked nothing alike, and that the coachbuilders' fabrication process was too slow to accommodate series production. The company's partnership with Pinin Farina, (Note: Rendered as "Pininfarina" since 1961.) which began in 1951, solved these issues, and allowed Ferrari to produce its cars at a higher volume. The 212 Inter was the first Ferrari to receive a Pinin Farina body: its minimal design, featuring a characteristic "egg-crate" grille, became the base of a recognisable, long-lasting design language shared by both companies.

The meeting that led to this partnership almost never happened. Battista Farina and Enzo Ferrari were equally headstrong, and neither of them wanted to leave their headquarters. Sergio, Battista's son, intervened and set up a meeting at a restaurant in Tortona, halfway between Maranello and Pinin Farina's headquarters in Turin. Here the two were able to strike a deal, Battista claiming in his autobiography that "one of us was looking for a beautiful, famous woman to dress and the other a world-class couturier to deck her out." The automotive press of the time predicted that the partnership would fall through, on account of the two men's strong personalities; against these assertions, the venture turned out successful, and Pininfarina came to design over 200 Ferrari models over the course of six decades.

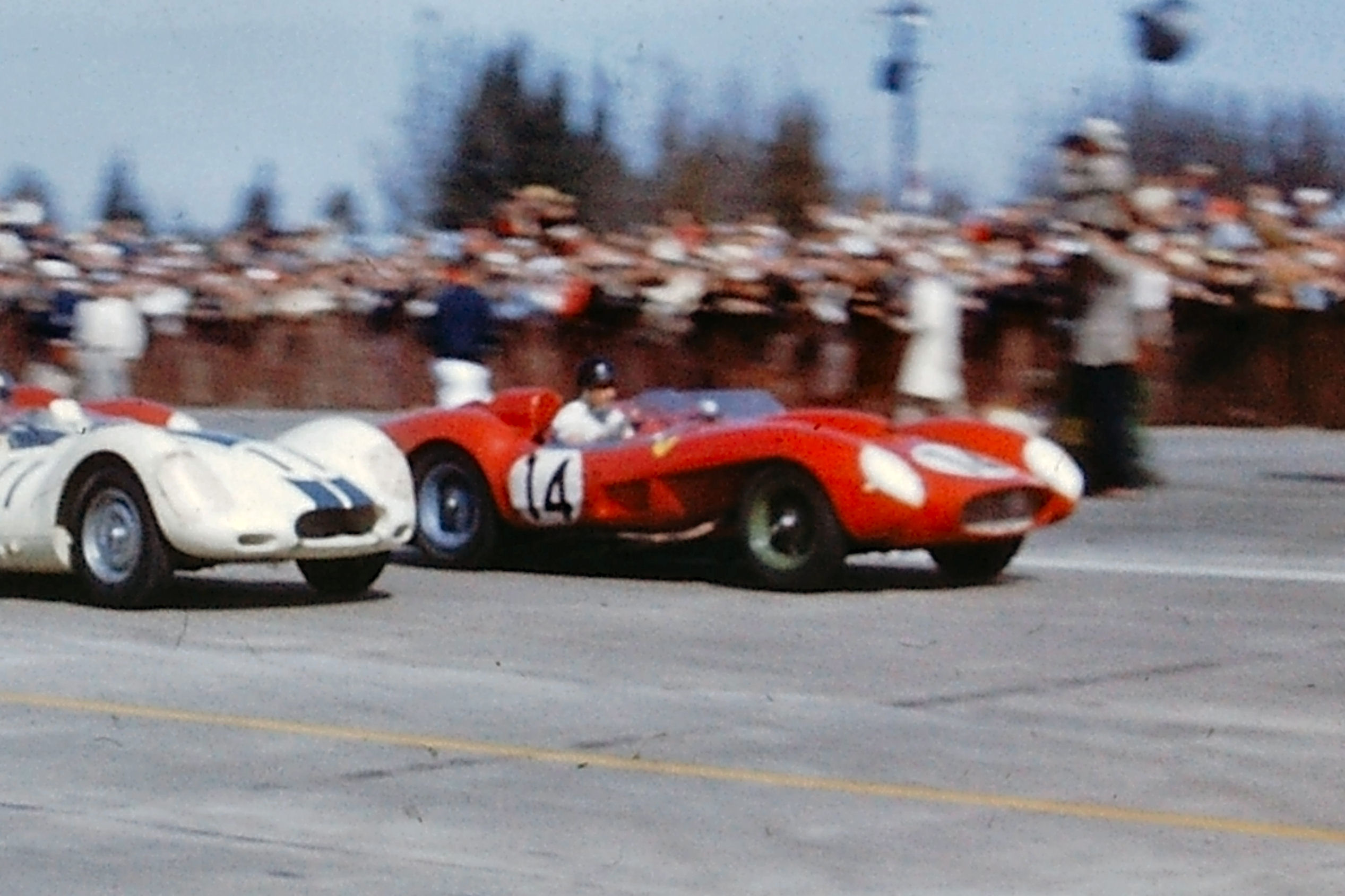
A 250 Testa Rossa (right), driven by Phil Hill at the 1958 12 Hours of Sebring. This Scaglietti-bodied car features distinctive "pontoon fenders."

Equally important was Ferrari's relationship with Scaglietti. Founded as a repair shop, it was located just across the street from Ferrari's facilities in Modena. According to Sergio Scaglietti, the firm's founder, he first caught Ferrari's attention after he rebuilt a Ferrari owner's wrecked car; as he worked, he made small changes to the car's bodywork, hoping to improve its aerodynamics. Enzo Ferrari was so impressed with Scaglietti's work that just days later, he commissioned him to build bodies for the 500 Mondial. Sergio's shop is said to have hammered its bodies on the fly, without assistance from drawings. While Pininfarina specialised in passenger car design, Scaglietti primarily constructed racing bodies: several Ferraris, including the 250 California Spyder, 250 GTO, and 250 Tour de France, were designed by Pininfarina and then built by Scaglietti.

== 1960–1973: Upheavals ==
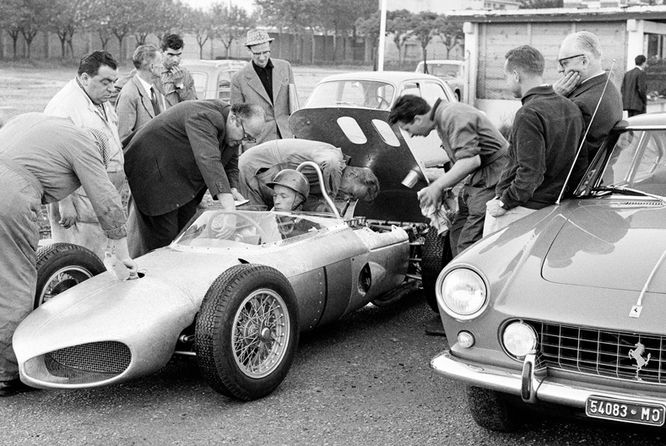
Unlike prior Ferraris, the 156 F1 had its engine behind the driver.

The 1950s had brought success to Ferrari, but also challenges, even the deaths of his son, several drivers, spectators. Companies with small 1500cc engines like Porsche sportscars and Cooper F1 had managed to beat the mighty V12 Ferrari because the engine was mounted rear-mid behind the driver. This allowed very low and simple single seaters, without the driver either sitting high on top of the drivetrain, or the drivetrain being asymmetric next to the driver. By 1959 Formula One was dominated by the new layout, with Ferrari sticking to front engines until the 2500cc rules expired after 1960. Other negative influences were strike actions in Italy which on several occasions prevented completion of cars or participation in races.

In 1960, Ferrari was restructured as a public company, Ferrari Società Esercizio Fabbriche Automobili e Corse S.p.A. (SEFAC) By this point it had established itself as a premier manufacturer of high-performance cars both for racing and for road use. Enzo Ferrari had developed a reputation as a craftsman, innovator, and motor racing icon, and his company invested nearly all of its profits from car sales into its racing programmes. Its racing record reflected this emphasis: between 1960 and 1965, the company counted two World Driver's Championships, two Constructors' Championships, and six consecutive Le Mans wins.

Finally, Ferrari adopted the mid-engine layout, which other racing teams had championed in years and decades prior, as it improved the cars' handling and traction over their front-engined predecessors. As a result, its car designs had also become more adventurous: the Dino-powered 156 F1 and 246 SP were the company's first formula car and sports prototype, respectively, to feature a mid-engine design, with the compact V6 engine. The 156 F1, piloted by champion driver Phil Hill, gave Ferrari both titles of the 1961 Formula One season, and the 246 SP took two victories at the 1961 and 1962 Targa Florio.

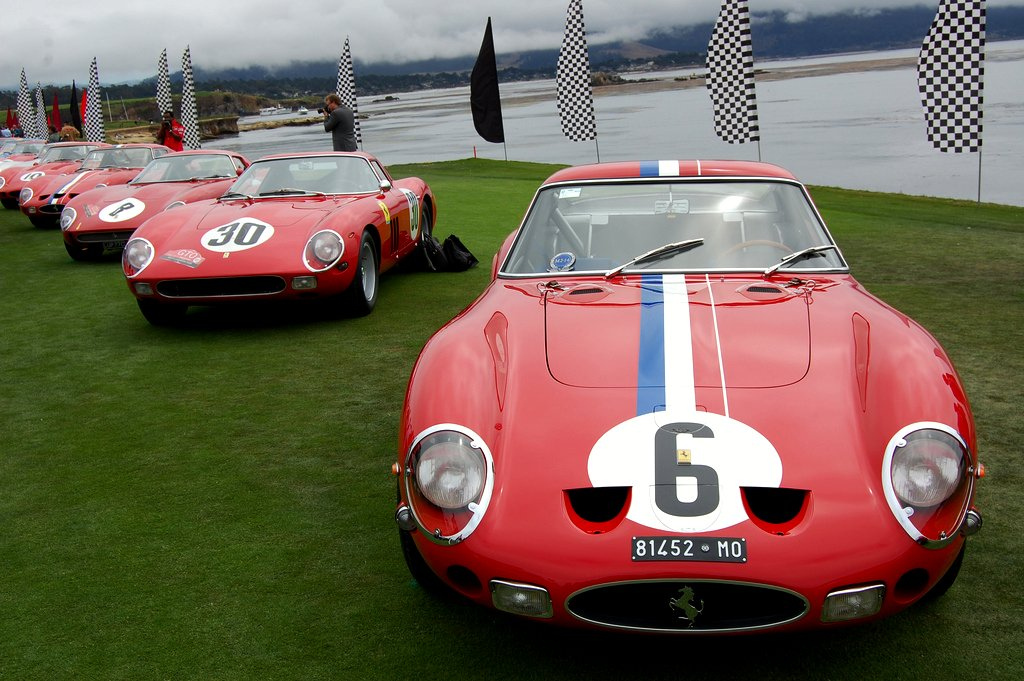
Five 250 GTOs at the Pebble Beach Concours d'Elegance. The 250 GTO is one of the world's most expensive cars.

The V12 front-engined 250 GTO, though more conservative, was also a car to be reckoned with. The engine was mounted behind the front wheels thus front-mid engined, which had the side effect of giving the car a desirable long hood, short rear look. Meant to do battle against cars like the similarly designed six-cylinder Jaguar E-Type, between 1962 and 1964 the V12 GTO often backed up prototype Ferraris at the 24 Hours of Le Mans, finishing second twice. In many races it took several podium finishes and class wins, and won the World Sportscar Championship's Over-2000cc GT class for three consecutive years. The 250 GTO is currently one of the world's most valuable cars, owing to a combination of its racing provenance, driving experience, and long hood aesthetics. In 2017 an example sold for US$44,000,000, and by 2019 the four most expensive car sales in history, whether privately or at auction, had all been for 250 GTOs.

=== The "palace revolt" ===
One of the first challenges faced in the new decade occurred in late 1961 when the team, having suffered the fatal accident of von Trips and 14 spectators at Monza but secured both F1 World Championships, skipped the last race, the October 1961 US GP instead of promoting the marque and World Champion Phil Hill in the North American market. At the time, Enzo had been allowing his wife, Laura Ferrari, a bigger power in the company's day-to-day operations, and when Girolamo Gardini, the sales manager since 1950 disagreed, he was fired. Also other high-ranking employees, including chief engineers Carlo Chiti and Giotto Bizzarrini and sporting director Romolo Tavoni, were concerned about her interference in their duties. After staging a walkout and hiring a lawyer to write on their behalf, the eight were personally terminated from Ferrari by Enzo, who accused them of attempting to start their own company. The event is known by several evocative names including "great walkout," "palace revolt," and "Ferrari's Night of the Long Knives."

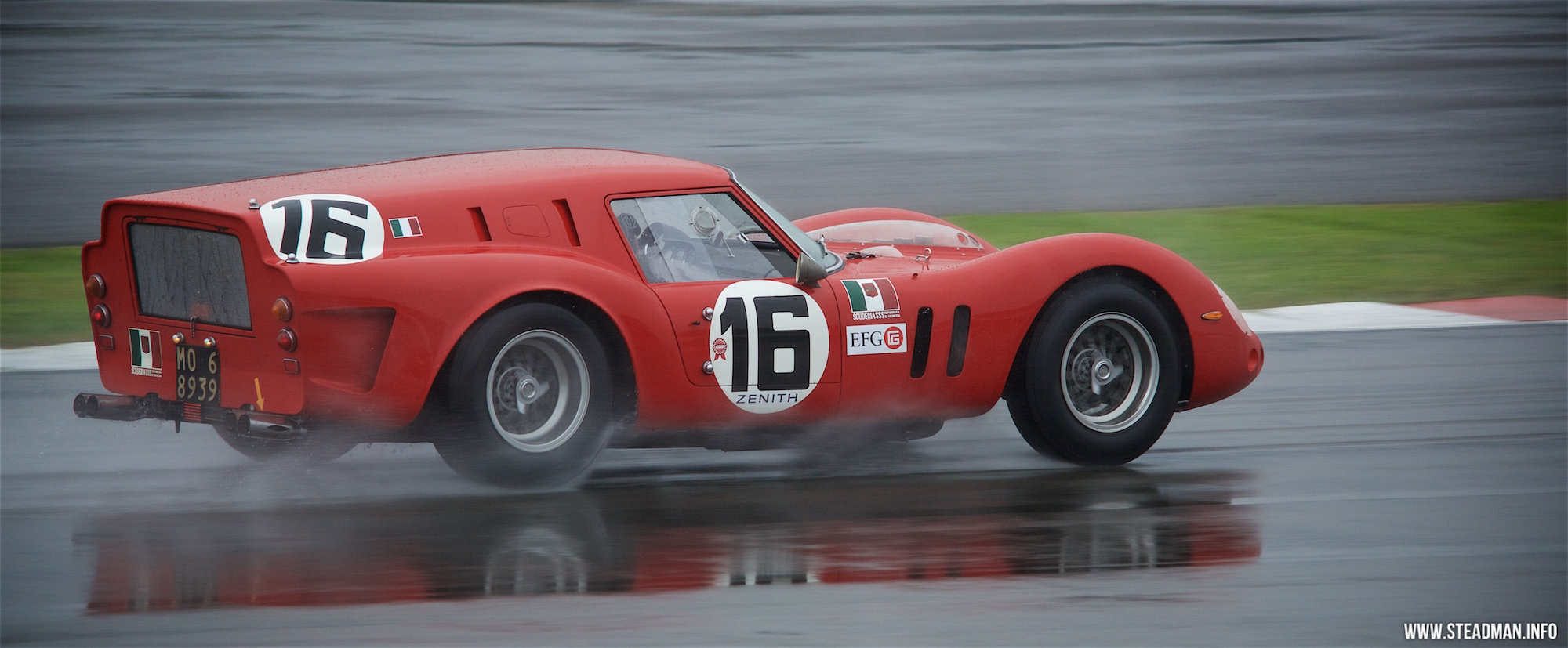
The peculiarly shaped 250 GT SWB Breadvan, a 1961 Ferrari modified in 1962 by former employees to challenge the factory 250 GTOs they had developed but not completed

The event represented a considerable loss of talent from Ferrari. The company was able to compensate through leveraging new hires and its preexisting employees. After Chiti's departure a young Mauro Forghieri became Ferrari's new chief racing engineer, a position wherein he assisted in the development of several new racing vehicles, including the Ferrari P prototype series and the innovative 312 F1 formula car, Ferrari's first to feature a rear wing. Forghieri would also cap off the development of the Bizzarrini-designed 250 GTO, and create the first Ferrari flat-12 engine. Eugenio Dragoni became the new F1 team director, a position he would hold until 1966. While Tavoni had been popular with his drivers, Dragoni was not, and personal problems between him, Phil Hill, and John Surtees would cause the two to leave the team in 1962 and 1966, respectively.

The men who were ousted from Ferrari took their skills elsewhere, assisting both well-established companies and smaller, start-up manufacturers. Bizzarrini and Chiti would first prove Enzo right by founding their own automotive company, Automobili Turismo e Sport (ATS). Before the company folded in 1964, the two had produced the ATS 2500 GT — the second mid-engined road car in history and the first from Italy — as well as the "Breadvan," a custom Ferrari 250 GT made for Giovanni Volpi, one of ATS's founders and key investors. Following this, the two engineers went their separate ways: Chiti would find a home at Alfa Romeo, helping create the Tipo 33 Stradale during his tenure there, while Bizzarrini focused on his own company, through which he designed the Lamborghini V12 engine and Iso Grifo, among other projects. Bizzarrini's company would ultimately fold in 1968.

=== Ferrari versus Ford ===
==== Failed Ford buyout ====
By 1963, Enzo, wishing to focus more closely on Ferrari's racing programme, began searching for a company to which he could outsource its manufacturing operations. An offer was sent that February to Ford Motor Company, which was looking to expand its presence in Europe, a market where a brand's racing performance mattered more than it did in the United States. Henry Ford II, Ford's CEO, jumped at the opportunity to buy Ferrari: he hoped that by buying the Italian company, Ford would immediately gain racing credibility that it could use to sell cars in Europe. Ford sent four delegations to Maranello in the following months, with one, led by Donald N. Frey, arriving at Enzo's office to work out a contract. There, they toured Ferrari's facilities and discussed various opportunities that the buyout would open up.

By 21 May, Frey's delegation had come up with a final contract. Ford was to buy 90% of Ferrari, after which there would be two corporate entities: "Ford–Ferrari," which would manufacture road cars, and "Ferrari–Ford," a more or less independent racing team. Things appeared to be going well until Enzo found a clause, requiring the racing team to request its funds from Ford, that he felt threatened his autonomy. He then asked about his right to field cars as he pleased: after Frey responded negatively, Enzo is said to have insulted and cursed the delegation out of the room. On 22 May, just one day later, a newswire release indicated that negotiations between the two companies had been suspended. In light of the news, Henry Ford II resolved to prove Ford's racing abilities by beating Ferrari at Le Mans, and a new engineering team was formed specifically to design the car that could do the job.

==== Racing rivalry ====
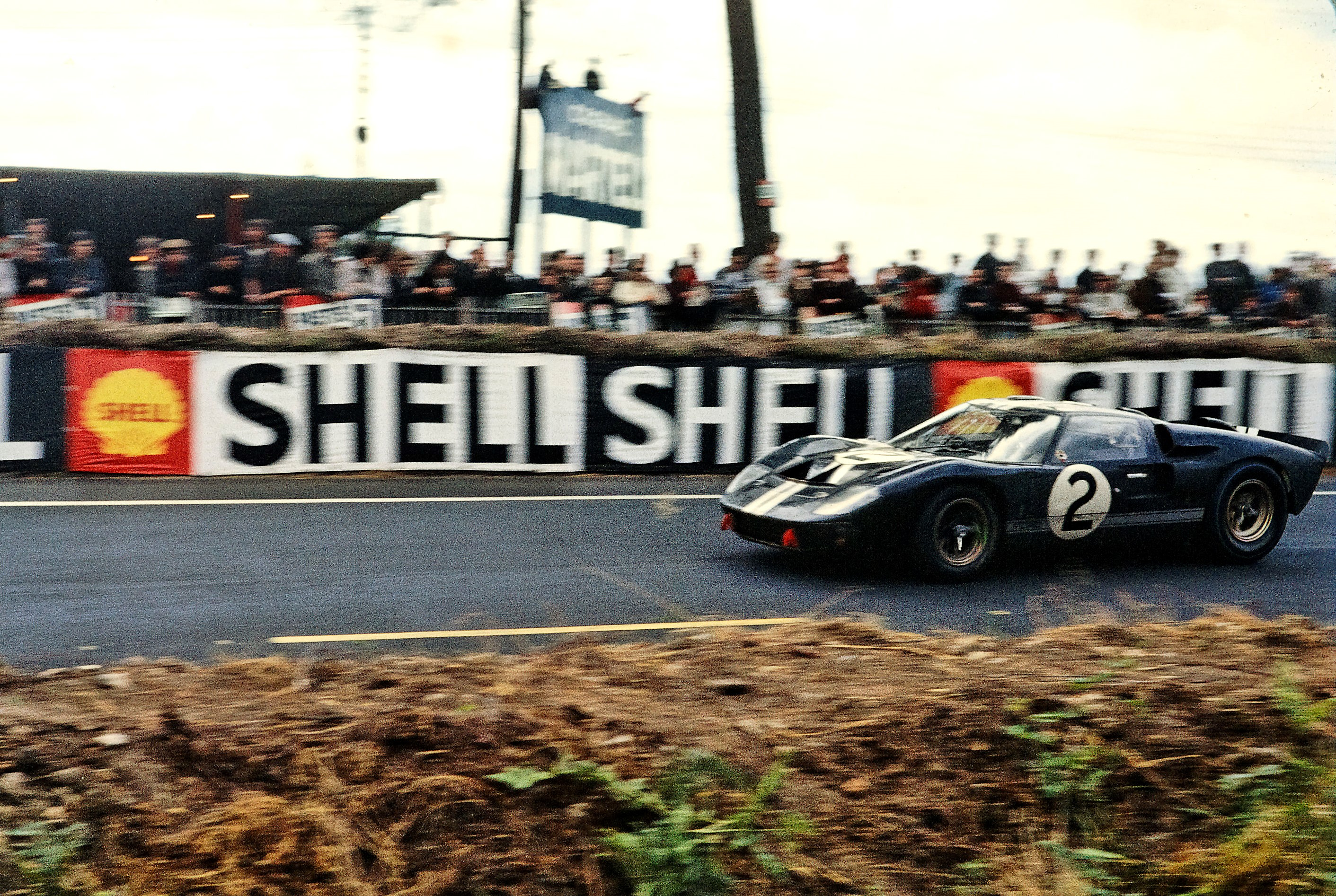
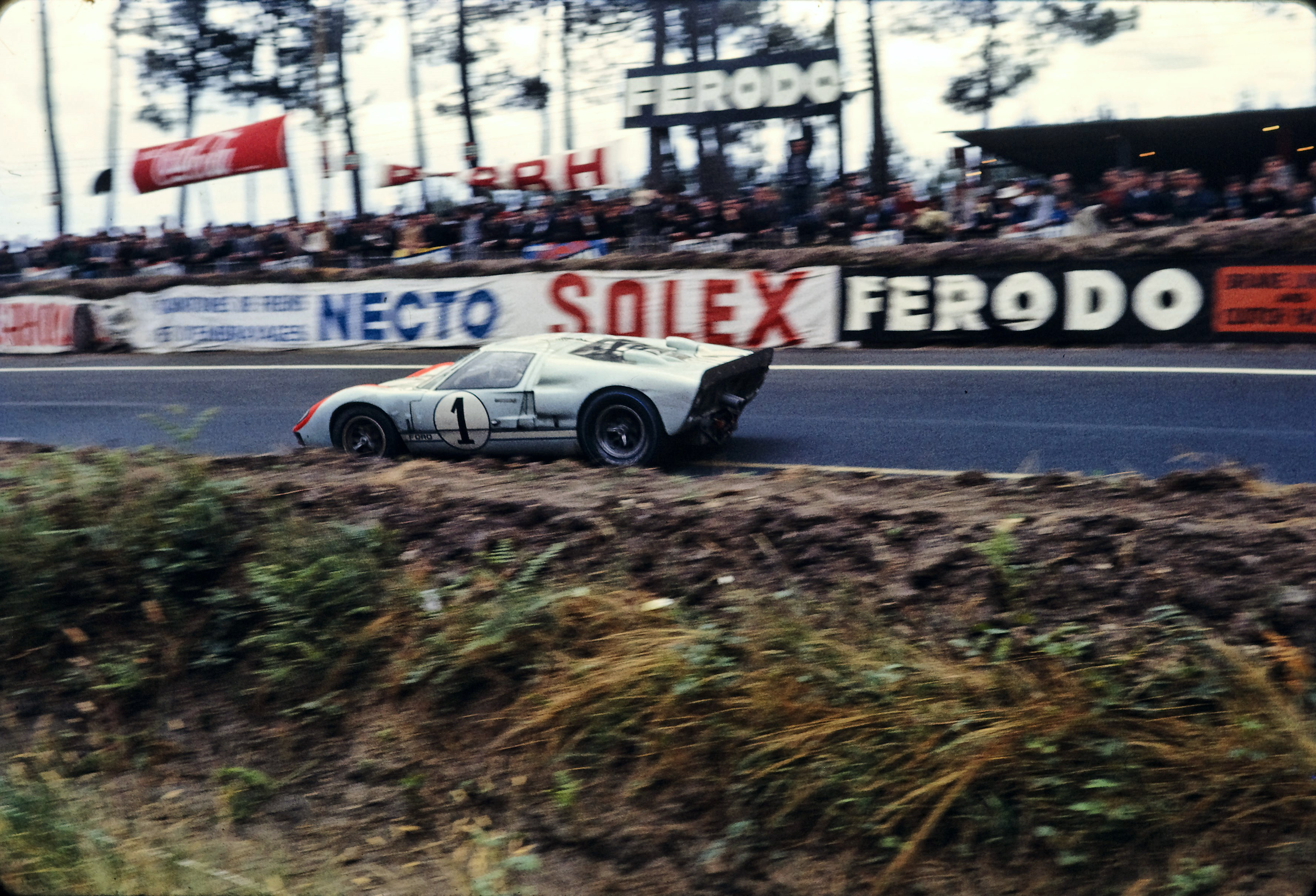
Two Ford GT40s — cars #2 (top) and #1 (bottom) — placed first and second, respectively, at the 1966 24 Hours of Le Mans. The two cars, which crossed the finish line simultaneously, ended Ferrari's six-year winning streak at the race.

In June 1963, shortly after Ferrari negotiations fell through, Ford began work on a sports prototype that would be ready to race by the 1964 24 Hours of Le Mans. The resulting car, the Ford GT40, was unreliable and failed to finish the race. However, Ford's partner team, Shelby American, scored a class victory above Ferrari's cars and finished fourth overall. Its car, the Shelby Daytona, was based on the race-proven Shelby Cobra roadster, and was a full 5 mph (8 km/h) faster than Ferrari's competing 250 GTOs. Ferrari's prototypes took first through third overall, with first place going to the 275 P driven by Nino Vaccarella and Jean Guichet.

An updated version of Ford's car, the GT40 Mk II, was ready in time for the 1965 24 Hours of Le Mans. Four original GT40s and two Mk IIs, spread between Ford, Shelby, and other teams, were fielded: none of them finished the race. One GT-class Cobra finished in 8th place, the other four entries retiring over engine trouble. Ferrari took first through third in the race, with first place going to Masten Gregory and Jochen Rindt, driving a 250 LM fielded by NART. After the first three hours of the race there were never less than three Ferraris in the lead; at one point, there were six. Following the race, one columnist commented that "when some Ferraris fail there is always a healthy one around to finish first."

The climax of the Ferrari–Ford rivalry was the 1966 24 Hours of Le Mans, where eight of Ford's Mk IIs raced against two Ferrari 330 P3s. Ford's cars placed first through third in the race, first and second crossing at the same time in a photo finish. First place was granted to Chris Amon and Bruce McLaren, who started further back on the starting grid than their teammates, Ken Miles and Denis Hulme. A single Ferrari finished the race: a 275 GTB driven by Roy Pike and Piers Courage, which took home a GT class victory. Ford's victory in 1966 marked the end of Ferrari's six-year winning streak, and the beginning of the end for the company's sports car racing programme.

=== Racing activity after 1966 ===
Following Ford's victory in 1966, Ferrari began to experience significant setbacks. One of these was the result of a rules change by the FIA which rendered Ferrari's newest prototype designs, the 412 P and 330 P4, ineligible for the 1968 World Sportscar Championship. This was because their engines were too large for the new 3-litre Group 6 Prototype category, and too few examples had been built to allow homologation for the 5-litre Group 4 Sports Car category, which required production of at least 50 units. As a result, Ferrari declined to participate in any sports car events that year, with the notable exception of Can-Am. The official reason given for the abstention was that it was a boycott, staged by Enzo Ferrari as a protest against the rules change, though it may also have been influenced by budgetary issues and poor performance in Formula One. The new rules did not affect cars like the Ford GT40 and Lola T70, which were popular among privateers and able to meet the prerequisite 50 units produced, and Ford ultimately went on to win the championship.

Though Ford's cars won at Le Mans through 1969, and took the championship as a whole in 1968, Ferrari's absence that year effectively ended its rivalry with the American automaker early. In spite of this, the Cosworth DFV engine, developed with Ford's sponsorship and input, later proved highly competitive in Formula One. In the late 1960s and throughout the 1970s the engine would allow several privateer teams, including Lotus, McLaren, Williams, Tyrrell, and Brabham, to surpass Ferrari and other factory teams competitively. These teams, derisively called garagisti ('garage teams') by Enzo Ferrari, were free from the high costs associated with powertrain development; they instead focused their resources on chassis development and aerodynamics. It would take until 1975 for Ferrari to win another F1 championship.

Ferrari's F1 woes, combined with pressure from its new owner Fiat, eventually pushed it to abandon sports car racing in 1973, though this is not to say that the preceding years were uneventful. Before bowing out of the discipline, Ferrari went on to win two more World Sportscar Championships, one in 1967 and another in 1972. Ferrari's performance in 1972 was particularly strong, as it lost only one of that season's eleven races. The company also saw significant competition with Porsche in 1970 and 1971, as the Ferrari 512 proved to be one of the only cars able to keep up with the speedy, light, and reliable Porsche 917; though Porsche's wealth and more robust development allowed it to maintain an edge, Ferrari still managed several victories.

=== Ferrari vehicles of the 1960s ===
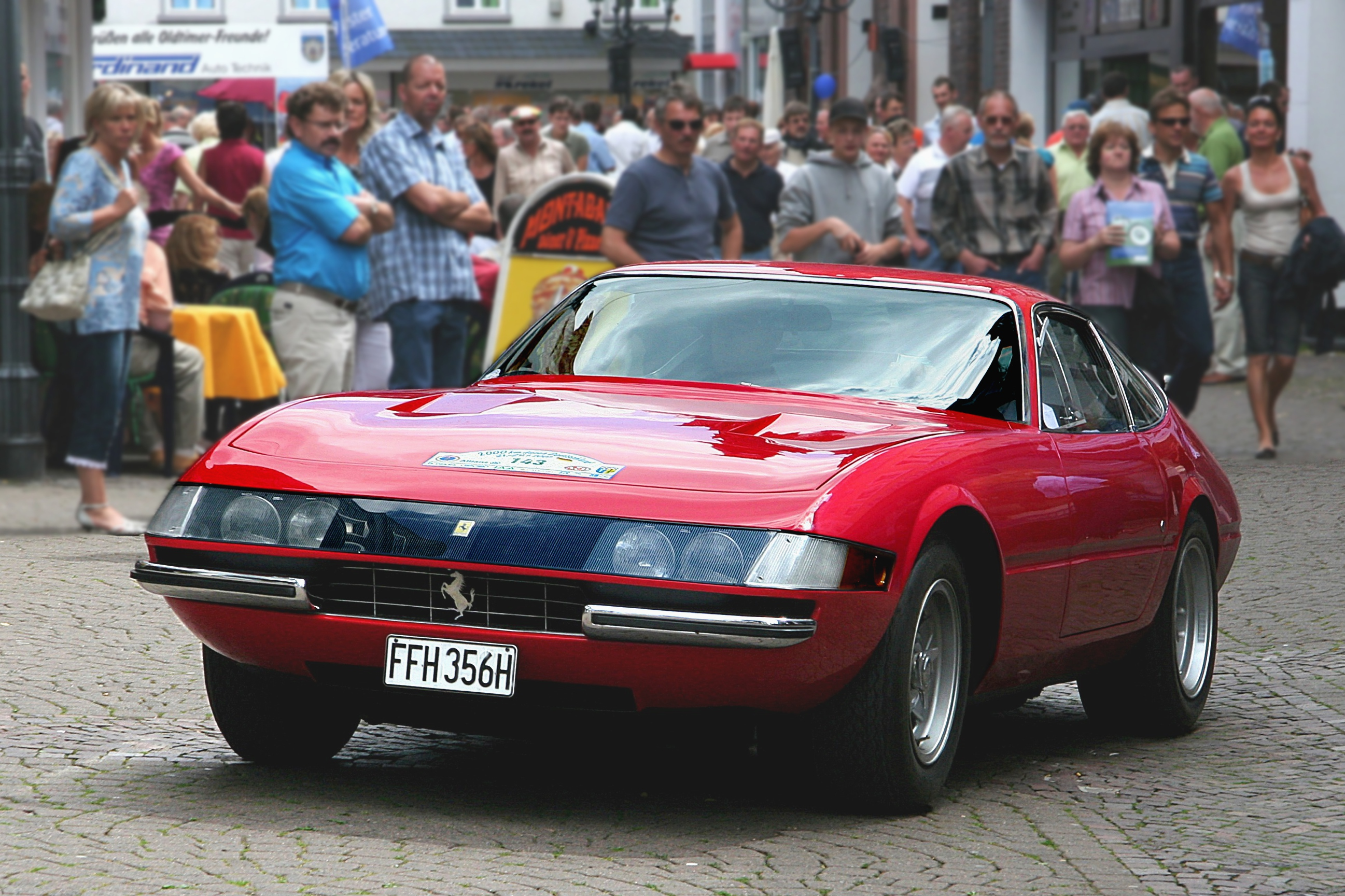
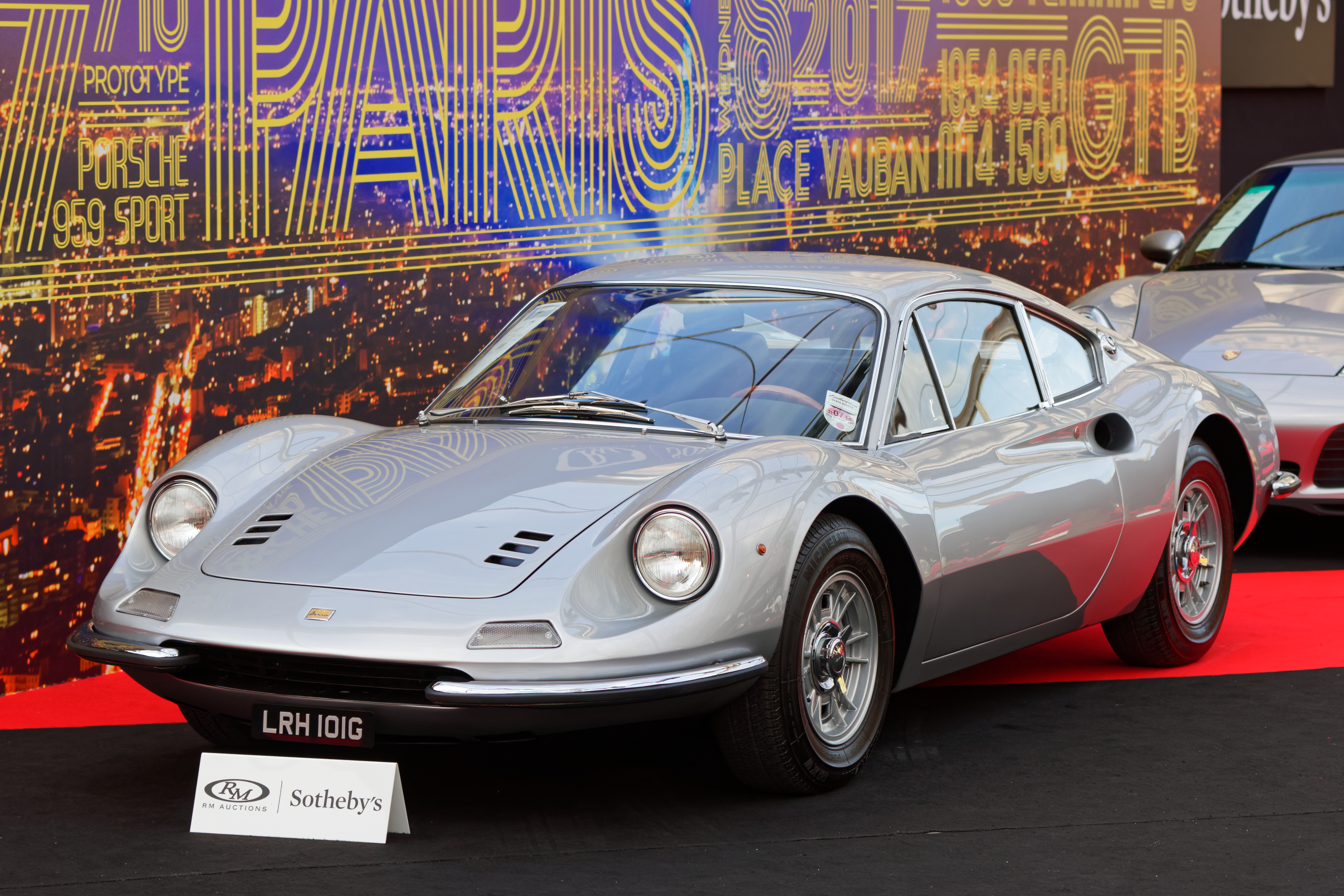
The innovative features of the 365 GTB/4 (top) and Dino 206 GT (bottom) heralded a new direction for Ferrari's road cars.

In the first half the 1960s, Ferrari retained several models that were direct continuations of older cars. The 250 range culminated in the GT/E, which was the company's first 2+2, and the GT Lusso, the final 250 car — it would be produced until 1964. The America range switched from the Lampredi engine to the Colombo beginning in 1960, bringing it in line with Ferrari's other offerings, and ended by 1966. The final car in the America lineage was the 500 Superfast, which housed the company's largest and most powerful engine to date.

Close to the discontinuation of the 250 series, similar models with higher engine displacements began production. The first of these were the 330 and 275 series, which were first produced for the 1963 and 1964 model years, respectively. These were later joined by the 365 series, which began in 1966.

The Dino 206 GT, first produced for the 1967 model year, was Ferrari's first mass-produced mid-engined street car, as well as the first to be sold under the Dino marque. Sharing a market with cars like the Porsche 911, which could match Ferraris in performance for a fraction of the cost, the 206 GT — and its higher-displacement update, the 246 GT — were sold for a substantially lower price than Ferrari's flagship models. Aside from its novel engine placement, it was also the first road Ferrari to do away with a V12 engine, opting instead for the Dino V6 which grants the car its name. The innovations brought about by the Dino could be seen in Ferrari's higher-end models starting in the 1970s.

Compared to the Dino, the 365 GTB/4 took a more conservative approach to performance. Commonly called the "Daytona", the GTB/4 was based largely on its predecessor, the front-engined 275 GTB, and was the final flagship Ferrari to feature a front-engine design. Ferrari's engineers gave the car several high-performance features, including all-independent suspension, four-wheel disc brakes, and a rear transaxle, inherited from the 275 GTB, which aided the car's weight distribution; the engine, a "Tipo 251" iteration of the Colombo, was rated at 352 bhp on European models. Breaking with Ferrari's previous design conventions, the car was also given angular, aerodynamic bodywork. These features combined helped the 365 GTB/4 become the world's fastest production car, topping out at 174 mph (280 km/h) — exactly 3 mph (5 km/h) faster than the previous record holder, the Lamborghini Miura. Examples modified for racing could reach speeds in excess of 190 mph (306 km/h).

=== Fiat partnership and buyout ===
Ferrari first worked with Fiat in 1965, when new homologation regulations within Formula Two required Ferrari to produce at least 500 examples of its F2 engine, the Dino V6, which was more than its factory was capable of. Ferrari needed a partner to produce its engine in volume, a position which Fiat was interested in. Between 1966 and 1973, Fiat produced over 7,000 examples of the engine for its Fiat Dino sports car. Following the success of this collaboration, the two companies began to discuss a potential takeover by Fiat.

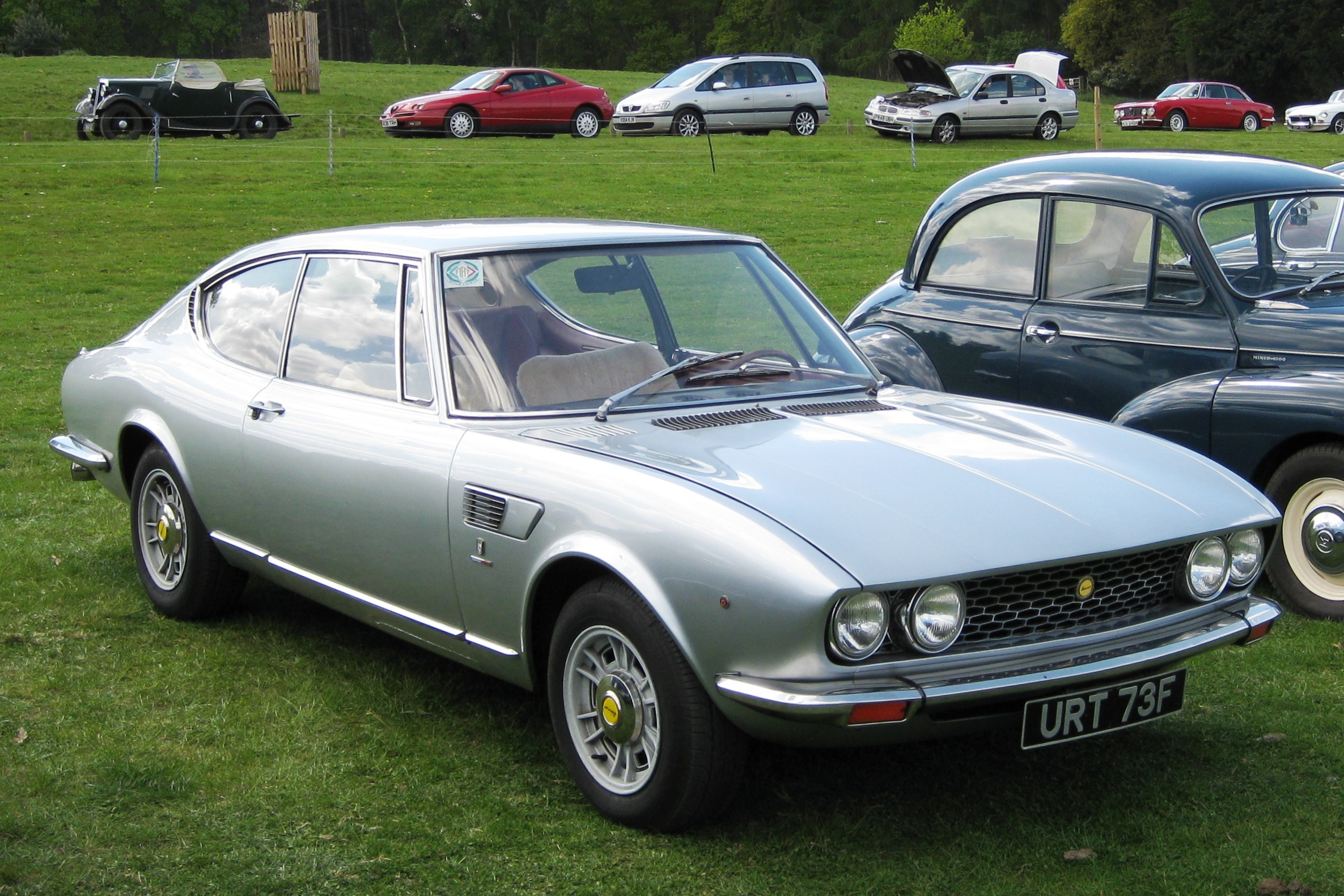
The Fiat Dino was a collaborative effort between Fiat and Ferrari.

As Ferrari struggled with sales and production in the late 1960s, it reluctantly turned to Fiat for financial assistance, and the two would complete an acquisition deal in June of 1969. Fiat S.p.A. received 50% of the company's shares upon its completion, with Ferrari keeping the other 50%. The 50–50 split in shares reflected a projected split in responsibilities, where Fiat would take charge of road car development and manufacturing, while Enzo would retain complete control over racing operations. An immediate result of the buyout was an increase in available investment funds, and work started at once on a factory extension intended to transfer production of the Fiat Dino over from Turin. New model investment further up in the Ferrari range also received a boost. Ferrari's racing programme was also able to capitalise on this influx of funds, allowing the company to create the Ferrari 512 prototype car, a new test track located in Fiorano Modenese, and the Tipo 001, a new iteration of the company's flat-12 racing engines.

The buyout had an immediate positive effect on Ferrari's sales — between 1969 and 1972, they increased exponentially — but not on its other financial metrics: soon after the acquisition, Ferrari's operating revenue and gross operating income both fell drastically. It had also hurt industrial relations at Ferrari's Maranello factory. In June, a visiting journalist witnessed a group of workers suddenly running out of a workshop in response to the blast of a whistle: this was part of an industrial stoppage originating at the main Fiat plant in Turin, and contrasted with the relatively smooth state of production that the writer had witnessed at nearby competitor plants run by Maserati, De Tomaso, and Lamborghini.

While increased Fiat influence was quickly felt in the development, production and marketing of road cars, the racing department initially remained little-touched by Fiat's new status within the company as chief investor. Ferrari's and Fiat's engineers had a difficult relationship with one another, and Enzo, determined to retain control over racing, conducted Ferrari's research and development independently from Fiat. By 1973, though, Fiat's presence was stronger. Concerned about the amount of revenue going into Ferrari's sports car racing programme, Fiat helped push it into giving up the discipline entirely: from that point onward, Ferrari would only participate in Formula One. Regardless, the writing was already on the wall at Ferrari, where Luca Cordero di Montezemolo, the company's sporting director, recognised the superior commercial value of F1 compared to sports cars, and lamented the company's recent poor performance there.

== 1974–1987: New approaches ==
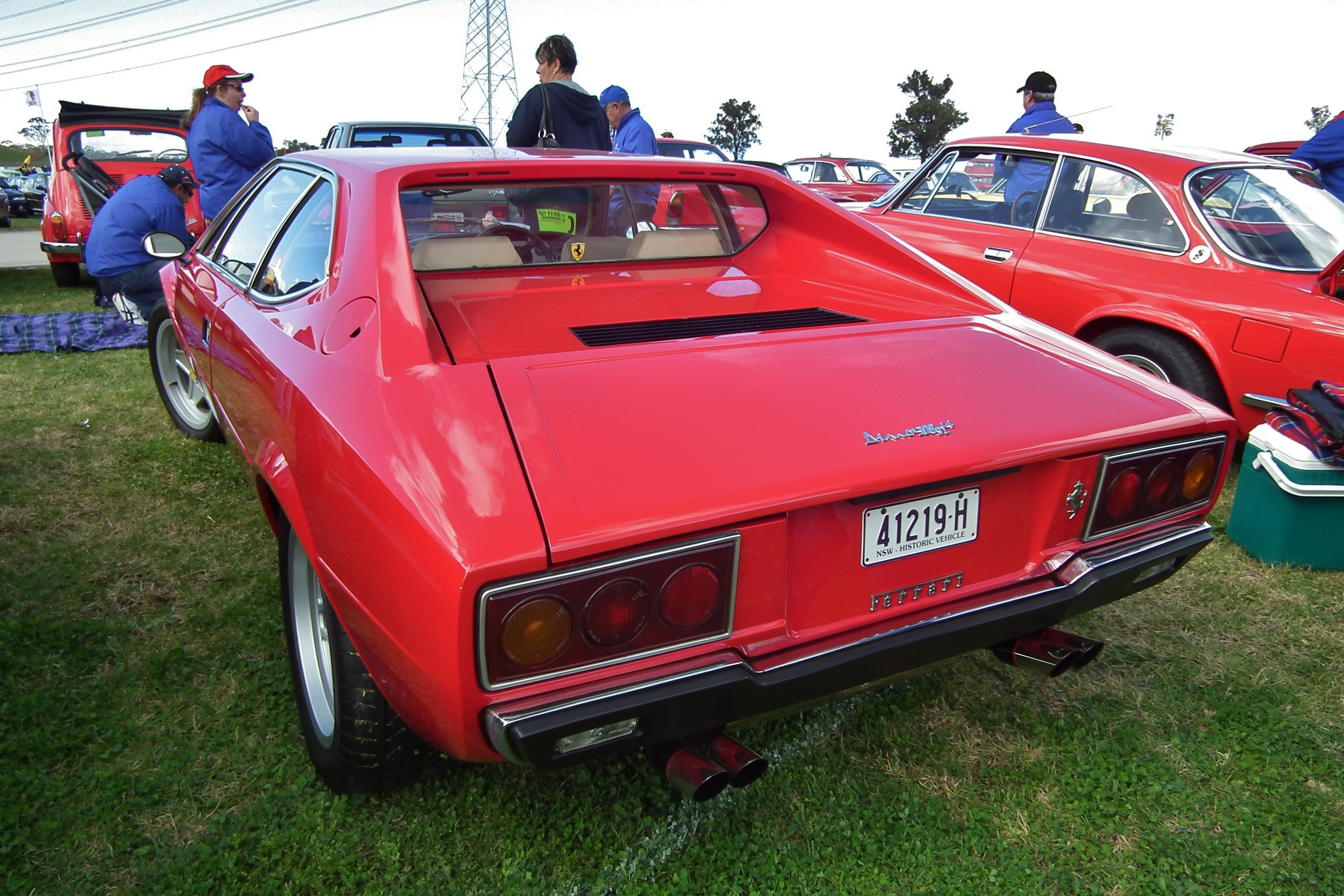
For some time, none of Ferrari's 12-cylinder models were officially sold in the United States. At one point in the mid-1970s, the Dino 308 GT4 was the only car on offer there; as the Dino brand was unpopular with American buyers, the car sold poorly until it was rebranded as a Ferrari in 1976. This 1975 GT4 features mixed Dino and Ferrari branding.

As the years went by, Ferrari settled further into its position as a Fiat subsidiary. The 308 GT4's designer, Carrozzeria Bertone, was chosen for the job by Fiat because of its previous success designing the Fiat Dino. Ferrari engineering could also be found in another Fiat marque, Lancia: two of its racing cars, the Stratos and LC2, utilized a Ferrari V6. By 1986, Ferrari had produced a one-off car for Fiat's chairman, Gianni Agnelli: in celebration of 20 years at the head of Fiat, Agnelli commissioned the Testarossa Spider, which featured many customisations tailored specifically for him.

In the United States, new safety and emissions regulations threatened to prevent Ferrari from selling its cars there. Some US-market Ferraris, like the 308 GTB, featured neutered power compared to their international counterparts, while others, like the 400 GT and Berlinetta Boxer, were not officially imported at all. Many Berlinetta Boxers arrived unofficially via grey market importers; after making landfall in the United States, these cars were "federalized"—given aftermarket emissions and safety equipment—in order to meet American roadworthiness standards. Similar issues occurred in Ferrari's native country of Italy, where a new engine tax induced by the 1973 oil crisis led the company to debore its V8 engine; the result was the 208 GT4, which possessed the lowest displacement V8 ever produced for a road car.

=== A new direction for road cars ===
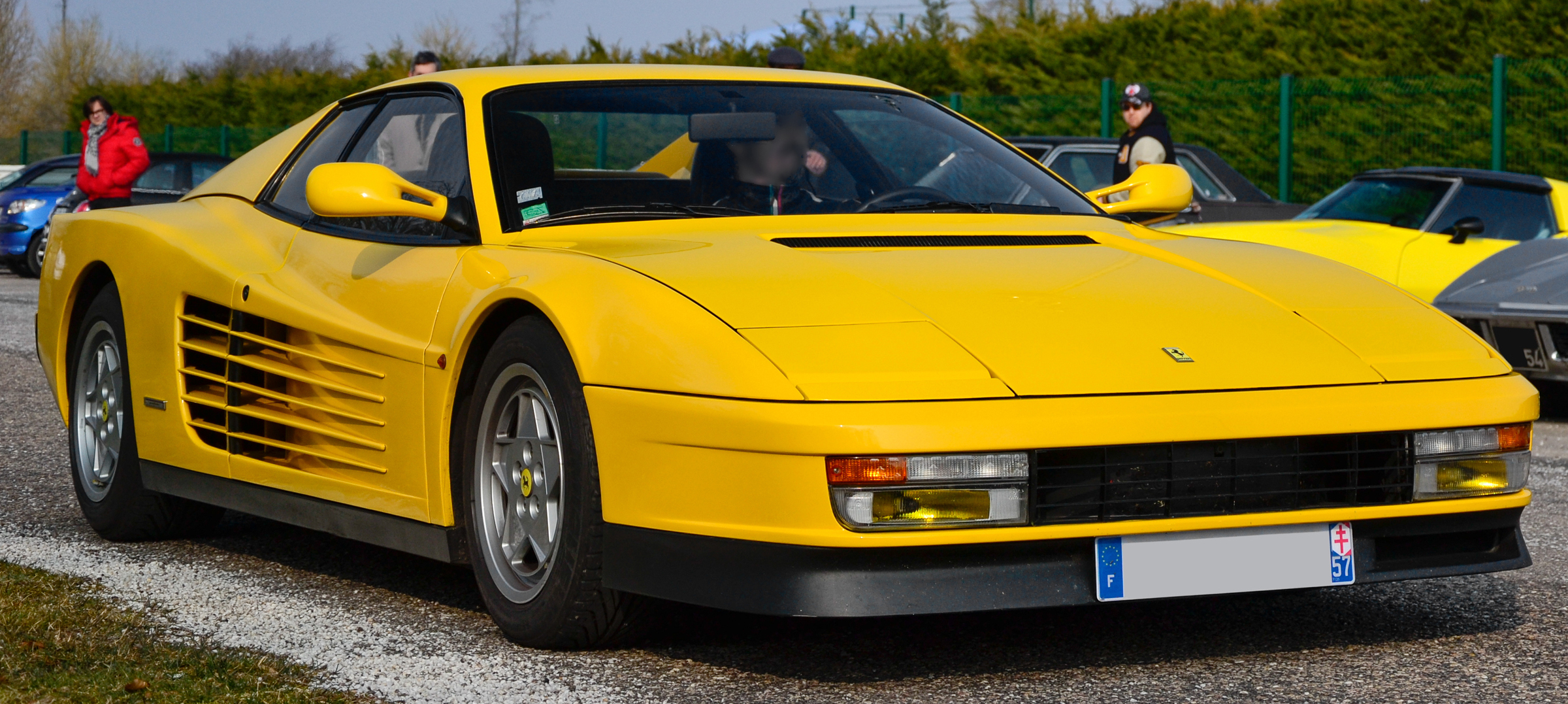
Thanks to its distinctive design and appearances in popular media, the Testarossa is one of the most well-known cars of the 1980s.

Abandoning many of its earlier design customs, the 1970s saw Ferrari adopt new features across much of its model lineup.

The Berlinetta Boxer, first produced in 1973, was the company's first flagship car to sport a mid-engined design. It also sported a new flat-12 engine, the Tipo F102A, and was the first Ferrari road car to feature such an engine. It was produced, with revisions along the way, until 1984, when it was replaced by the Testarossa.

The Testarossa was a natural evolution of the Boxer's design. This replacement was bigger, faster—at 180 mph (290 km/h), it was then the world's fastest production car—and seen as more contemporary than its predecessor. In spite of its large size and polarising design, with its "cheese grater" intake strakes singled out for ridicule, the car sold well. Due to appearances in media like the television series Miami Vice and the video game Out Run, the Testarossa would later become iconic of 1980s culture as a whole.

The Dino 308 GT4, the first road Ferrari to use a V8 engine, was launched in 1973. It was also Ferrari's first mid-engined 2+2, the first mass-produced (Note: Bertone had already made bespoke bodies for some early Ferraris.) Ferrari to be designed by Bertone, and the final to be marketed under the Dino brand. The GT4 was discontinued in 1980, though its engine and underpinnings were used by other Ferraris of this era, such as the 308 and Mondial. Of these V8 models, the 308 and its ilk were especially proliferous, and the car gave rise to a dynasty of similar designs that were sold into the following decades. These began with incremental revisions of the original 308, with entirely new models such as the 328 and GTO following in the mid-1980s. The GTO, originally conceived as a Group B homologation of the 308, is sometimes considered Ferrari's first supercar.

The 365 GT4 2+2, 400 and 412 grand tourers, produced from 1972 to 1989, were a comparatively conservative run of cars, holding on to the front-engine, V12 layout characteristic of earlier Ferraris; indeed, the model series was straightforwardly derived from the 365 GTC/4, and the cars were the final ones to utilize the decades-old Colombo V12. In spite of its conservativeness, this model series does have one major distinction: beginning in 1976, the 400 GT was the first Ferrari to be offered with an automatic transmission, a three-speed Turbo-Hydramatic produced by General Motors.

==== Privateer road racing ====
Though Ferrari itself had left sports car racing behind, many privateers continued to field the company's cars in various road events and categories. Notable privateer outfits include NART, who continued to race until 1983, and the chassis manufacturer Michelotto Automobili, which was well-supported by Ferrari and saw success in rallying events. These privateers modified Ferrari's road cars, often substantially, before sending them out to race: in one instance, a Group B racer's use of carbon kevlar in his 308 directly influenced Ferrari's own engineers, who later used the material in the F40.

=== Formula One successes and failures ===
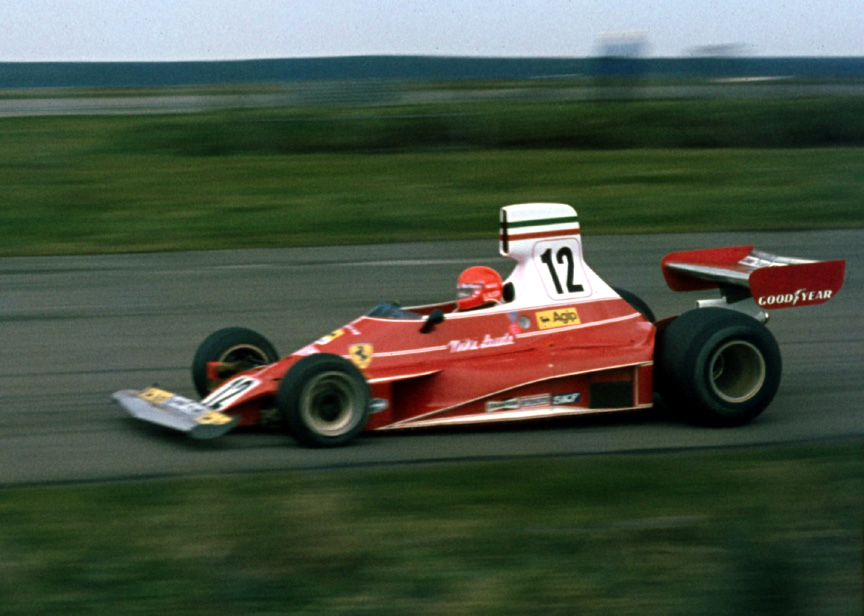
Niki Lauda driving a Ferrari 312T at the 1975 British Grand Prix.

By the mid-1970s, Ferrari once again saw success in F1. In 1975 and 1977 Niki Lauda won the drivers' title for the team, as did Jody Scheckter in 1979; they also won the constructors' title for three consecutive years, 1975–1977. In addition, Clay Regazzoni managed a close second place in the 1974 season, Lauda the same in 1976, and Carlos Reutemann third in 1978. Much of this success was due to the Tipo 015 racing engine, which combined a low-slung flat-12 layout with several design choices inspired by the DFV; these features allowed Ferrari's car, the 312T, slight but significant weight distribution and power advantages over those using DFVs. Though these advantages were later cancelled out by the advent of ground effect, a technology to which the low and wide flat-12 could not be adapted, Ferrari's continued fine-tuning of their engines allowed them to stay competitive through the late 1970s.

Starting with the 1980 season, the team entered an extended title drought. That year, Ferrari only managed 10th place in the drivers' championship, a problem brought about by their inability to adapt to ground effect. Even after regulators banned the technology, though, Ferrari still struggled with keeping its cars competitive and up to date. Attempting to fix this problem the team brought in new engineers, including John Barnard and Harvey Postlethwaite; the Postlethwaite-designed 126C2 won the team the 1982 and 1983 constructors' titles. Driver casualties, namely the death of Gilles Villeneuve and grave injury of Didier Pironi, also hurt the team, costing them a potential drivers' title in 1982. Ferrari would continue to perform underwhelmingly until the late 1990s.

== 1988–present: Contemporary Ferrari ==
Enzo Ferrari died in 1988, an event that saw Fiat expand its stake to 90%. The last car that he personally approved—the F40—expanded on the flagship supercar approach first tried by the 288 GTO four years earlier. Enzo was succeeded in 1991 by Luca di Montezemolo, under whose 23-year-long chairmanship the company greatly expanded. Between 1991 and 2014, he increased the profitability of Ferrari's road cars nearly tenfold, both by increasing the range of cars offered and through limiting the total number produced. Montezemolo's chairmanship also saw an expansion in licensing deals, a drastic improvement in Ferrari's Formula One performance (not least through the hiring of Michael Schumacher and Jean Todt), and the production of three more flagship cars: the F50, the Enzo, and the LaFerrari. In addition to his leadership of Ferrari, Montezemolo was also the chairman of Fiat proper between 2004 and 2010.

After Montezemolo resigned, he was replaced in quick succession by many new chairmen and CEOs. He was succeeded first by Sergio Marchionne, who would oversee Ferrari's initial public offering and subsequent spin-off from Fiat Chrysler Automobiles, and then by Louis Camilleri as CEO and John Elkann as chairman. Beginning in 2021, Camilleri was replaced as CEO by Benedetto Vigna, who has announced plans to develop Ferrari's first fully electric model. During this period, Ferrari has expanded its production, owing to a global increase in wealth, while becoming more selective with its licensing deals.

== See also ==
- Museo Ferrari
- Museo Casa Enzo Ferrari
