= Romolo Tavoni =

Italian sports executive (1926–2020)

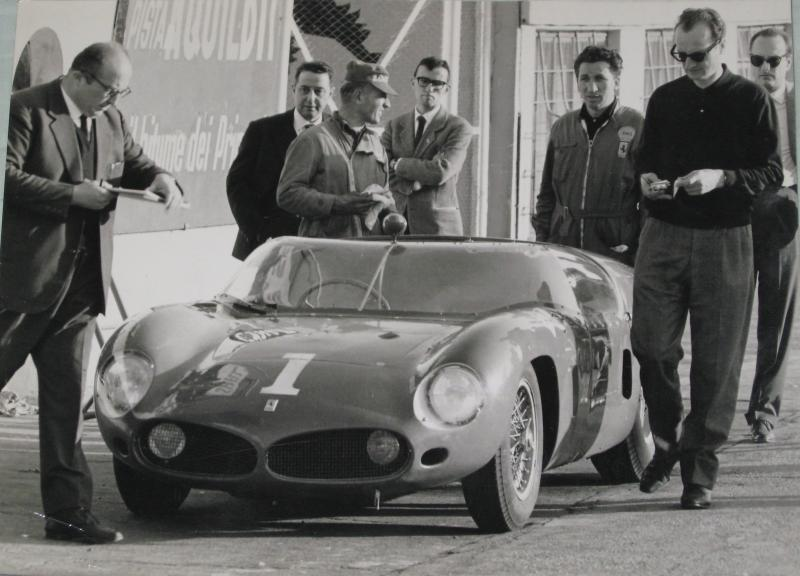
- Tavoni (2nd from right) in 1961
- Born: 30 January 1926; Formigine, Kingdom of Italy
- Died: 20 December 2020 (aged 94); Casinalbo, Italy
- Occupation: Sports Executive

Romolo Tavoni (30 January 1926 – 20 December 2020) was an Italian sports executive best known for his work at Ferrari.

Tavoni was born on 30 January 1926 in Formigine, a small town in the province of Modena. He began his career as a bank accountant, working at Credit Italiano in Modena. In January 1950, the bank manager introduced Tavoni to Enzo Ferrari, who was a client of the bank. Shortly after their meeting, Ferrari hired Tavoni as his private secretary.

In 1951 Ferrari sent Tavoni to the Indianapolis 500 to study how the cars were prepared for a possible future participation of the marque. Tavoni wrote a report suggesting that in order to be competitive, cars had to feature reinforced wheel hubs to deal with the four banked corners of the oval circuit. Ferrari's technical team didn't act on Tavoni's recommendation and in 1952 Alberto Ascari retired his Ferrari after a few laps when one of his wheel hubs collapsed.

In 1957 Tavoni was promoted Scuderia Ferrari's sporting director, overseeing the racing team's activities in Formula One, sports car racing and the European Hill Climb Championship. One of Tavoni's early races in this capacity was the 1957 Mille Miglia, an event marked by the fatal accident involving Ferrari drivers Alfonso de Portago and Edmund Nelson and that resulted in the cancellation of the race. Tavoni was also involved in Scuderia Ferrari's acrimonious split with racing driver Jean Behra, when the latter punched Tavoni and another patron following a discussion over Behra's retirement at the French Grand Prix in Reims.

Tavoni's most successful years as sporting director at Ferrari were 1958 and 1961, when Mike Hawthorn and Phil Hill won the Formula One World Championship.

At the end of the 1961 season, Tavoni was fired by Enzo Ferrari during the "great walkout" together with Carlo Chiti, Giotto Bizzarrini, Enzo Selmi, Ermanno della Casa, Girolamo Gardini, Federico Giberti and Fausto Galassi. Eugenio Dragoni succeeded him as team manager.

Following his departure from Ferrari, Tavoni worked at ATS and the CSAI (Italian Motor Sports Commission) in Milan. In 1965, Tavoni and Luigi Bertett (president of the Automobile Club of Milan) created "Formula Monza," a championship series designed for young and emerging racing drivers. He subsequently became the director of racing at the Autodromo Nazionale di Monza. Tavoni worked full-time at Monza until 1992, and continued to work on a part-time basis until approximately age 80.

After retiring, Tavoni lived at Casinalbo, near Modena. He died on 20 December 2020 at the age of 94.
