= ATS GT =

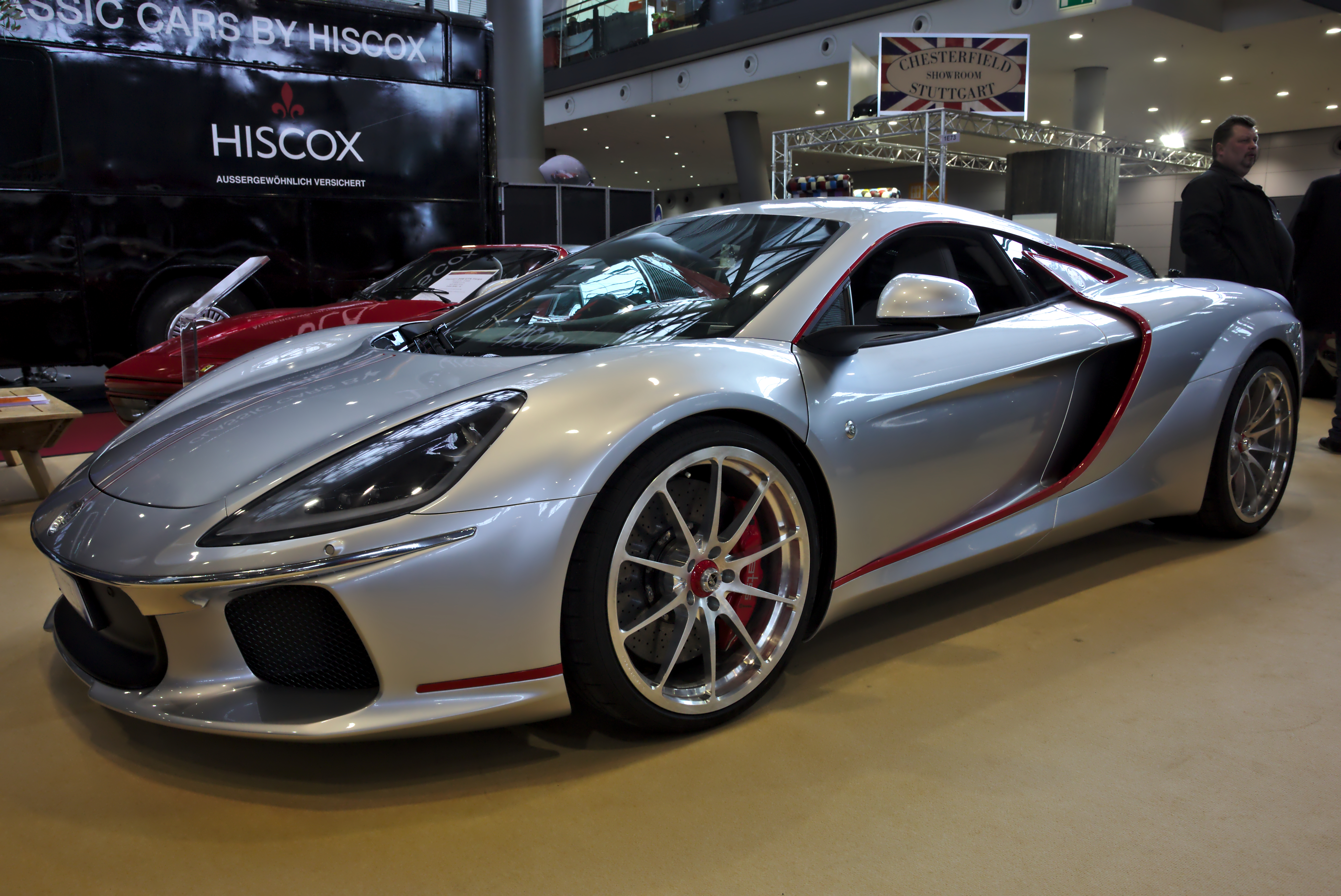

Overview
- Manufacturer: Automobili Turismo e Sport S.p.A.
- Production: 2019-present (12 units planned)

Body and chassis
- Class: Sports car (S)
- Body style: 2-door coupé
- Layout: Rear mid-engine, rear-wheel-drive
- Related: McLaren 12C; McLaren 650S

Powertrain
- Engine: 3.8-litre M838T twin-turbocharged V8
- Transmission: 7-speed dual-clutch

Dimensions
- Wheelbase: 2,670 mm (105.1 in)
- Length: 4,700 mm (185.0 in)
- Width: 1,960 mm (77.2 in)
- Height: 1,210 mm (47.6 in)
- Kerb weight: 1,300 kg (2,866 lb) (dry weight)

Chronology
- Predecessor: ATS 2500 GT (spiritual)

The ATS GT is a sports car manufactured by Italian automobile manufacturer Automobili Turismo e Sport (ATS). Introduced in 2017, the car pays homage to the company's first and only production model to date, the ATS 2500 GT.

== History and development ==
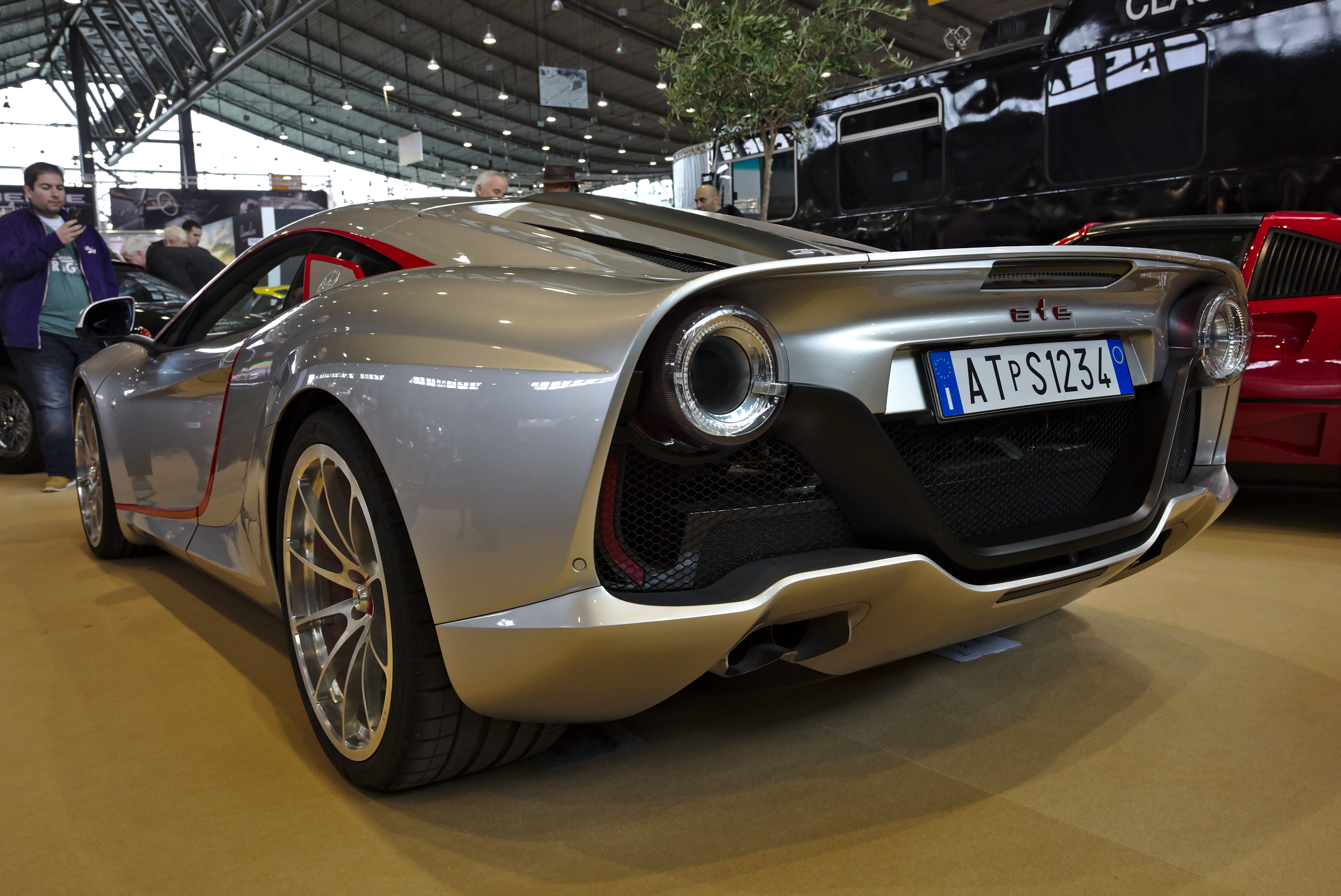
Rear view

The original ATS 2500 GT was developed and introduced at the 1963 Geneva Motor Show. Featuring a 2.5-litre V8 engine, the 2500 GT was the first mid-engine road car to reach the production stage. The 2500 GT was to be followed by a more powerful GTS variant, but hard times hit the company. Due to their failure in F1, the company soon faced its demise and folded in 1964, after having produced just 12 cars.

The ATS marque was bought by two investors in 2014, Emanuele Bomboi and Daniele Maritan. The newly resurrected marque set out to develop the GT, a car that captured the spirit of the original 2500 GT.

== Specifications ==
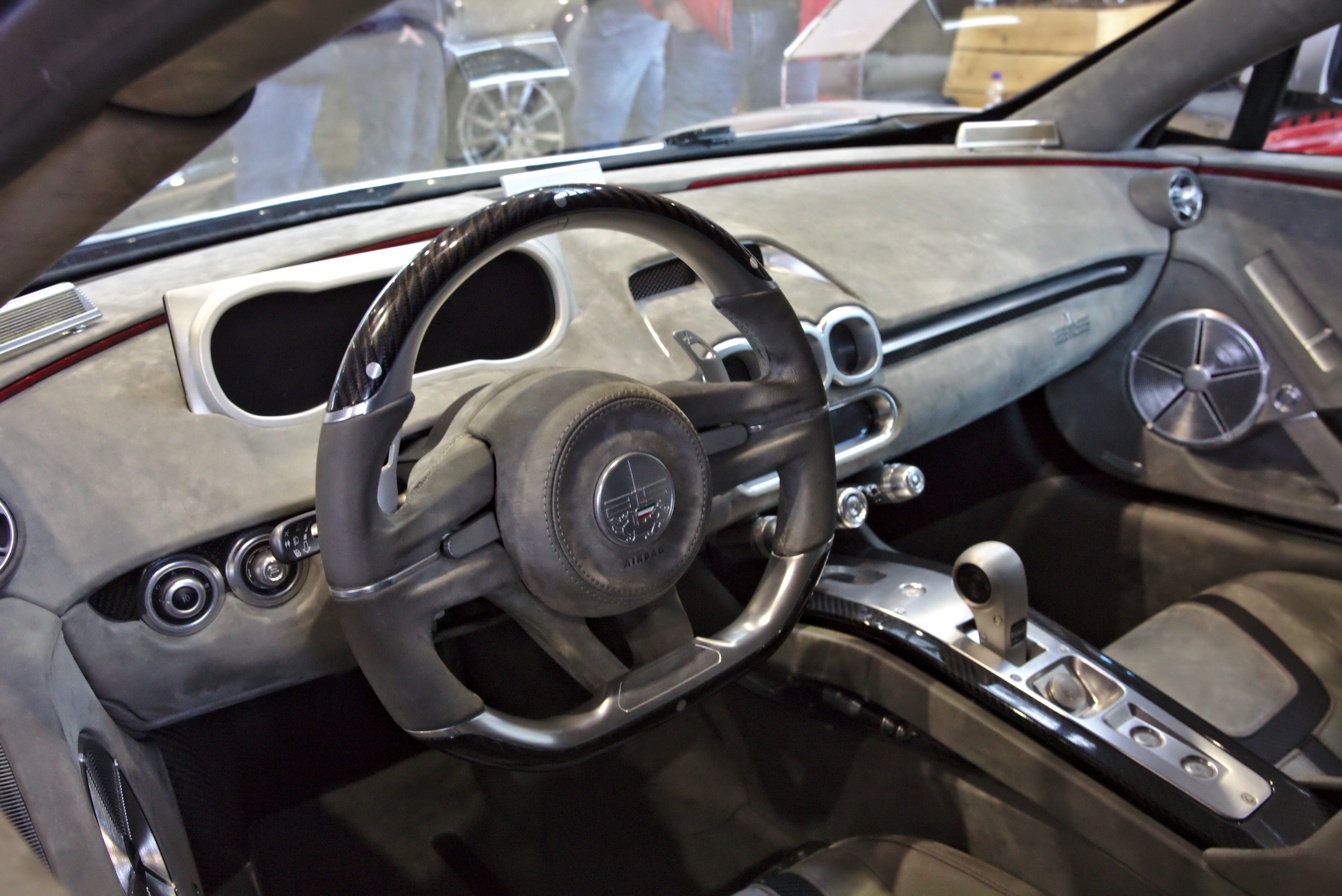
Interior

The front design of the car mimics the shape of the 2500 GT with a chin spoiler and triangular headlamps. Based on a McLaren 12C/650S, the car borrows many elements from its donor car, including the airbrake, wing mirrors and dihedral doors along with mechanical components such as the engine and transmission. The rear of the car features an opaque engine cover made from carbon fibre, along with rounded tail lamps and a wide mesh grille with a sweeping rear diffuser, making it different than the original 2500 GT in terms of design language. An interesting design element to note is a shape running from the rear of the car and ending on the rear quarter window. The shape mimics the aerodynamic profile of the original 2500 GT. Sensors hidden in flanks of the car open the doors, thus doing away with conventional door handles.

Ergonomics have been kept in focus on the interior. A TFT instrument cluster contains options for configuring the powertrain, suspension and aerodynamic components. The car's infotainment system makes use of Google Maps. Other notable features include wireless charging, and a premium Prima Orchestra hi-fi system that has 3 mm speakers at strategic points in the interior to provide good sound quality. The interior is finished in Nubuck leather and can be tailored to the customer's specifications.

The GT is powered by a 3.8-litre twin-turbocharged M838T V8 engine borrowed from the donor car. The engine is tuned to generate 650 PS (478 kW; 641 hp) and 675 N⋅m (498 lb⋅ft) of torque in standard configuration but can be further tuned to generate 700 PS (515 kW; 690 hp) and 750 N⋅m (553 lb⋅ft) of torque.

== Performance ==
The GT can accelerate from 0–97 km/h (0–60 mph) in 3.0 seconds, 0–194 km/h (0–121 mph) in 9.9 seconds and can attain a theoretical top speed of 322 km/h (200 mph).

== Production ==
ATS has announced a production run of 12 cars. Each car will be built exactly to the customer specifications and no two cars will be similar to one another.
