= LaFerrari =

Italian sports car manufactured 2013–2018

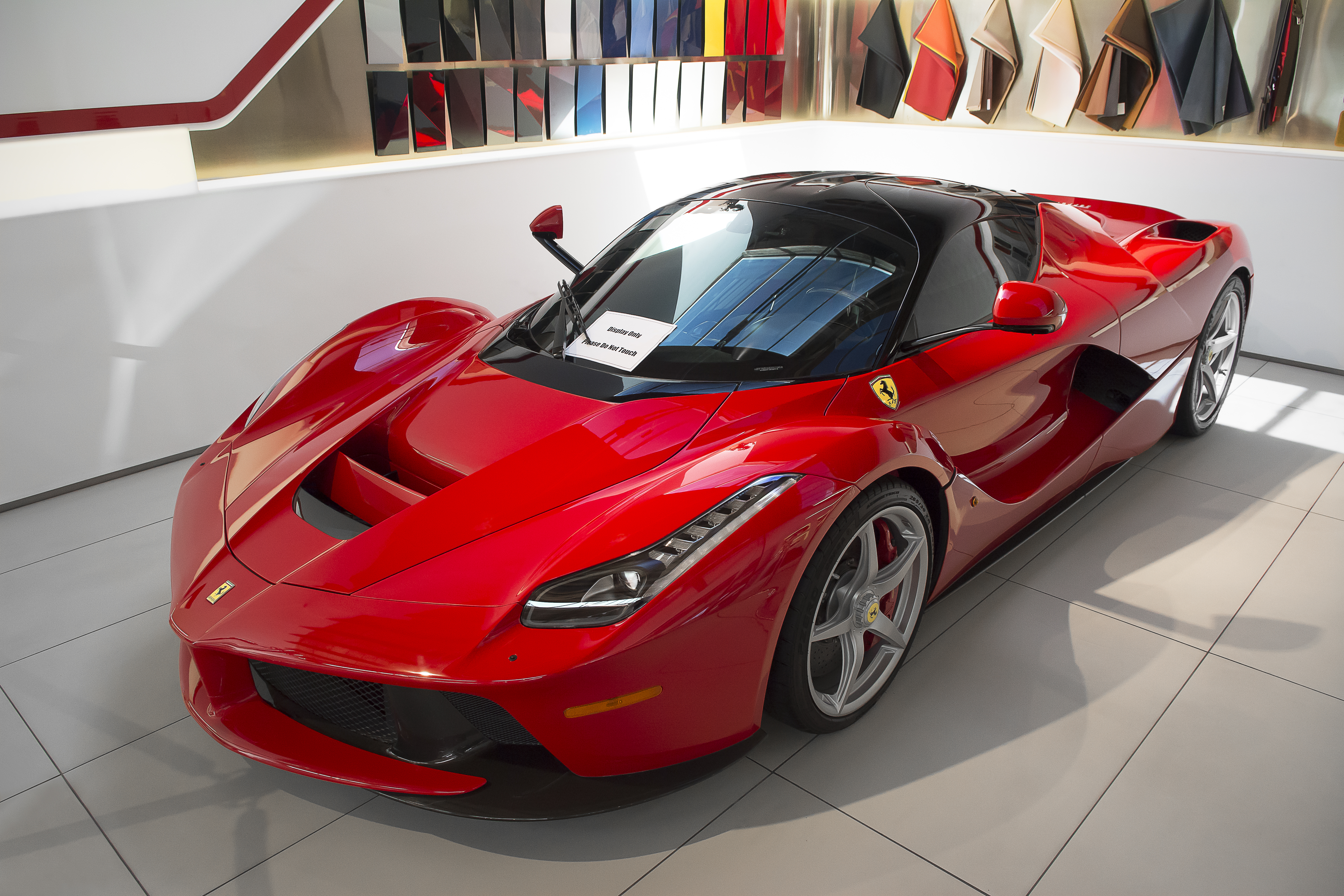

Overview
- Manufacturer: Ferrari
- Model code: F150
- Production: 2013–2018
- Model years: 2013–2016 (coupé); 2016–2018 (Aperta)
- Assembly: Italy: Maranello
- Designer: Ferrari Styling Centre under Flavio Manzoni

Body and chassis
- Class: Sports car (S)
- Body style: 2-door coupé 2-door targa top (Aperta)
- Layout: Rear mid-engine, rear-wheel-drive
- Doors: Butterfly (coupé); Swan (Aperta)
- Related: Ferrari FXX-K; Ferrari Daytona SP3

Powertrain
- Engine: 6.3 L F140 FE V12
- Electric motor: 1 electric motor and KERS
- Power output: 708 kW (950 hp; 963 PS)
- Transmission: 7-speed dual-clutch automatic
- Hybrid drivetrain: Mild Hybrid

Dimensions
- Wheelbase: 2,650 mm (104.3 in)
- Length: 4,702 mm (185.1 in)
- Width: 1,992 mm (78.4 in)
- Height: 1,116 mm (43.9 in)
- Kerb weight: 1,585 kg (3,495 lb)

Chronology
- Predecessor: Ferrari Enzo
- Successor: Ferrari F80

The LaFerrari (project name F150) is a limited production mid-engine, mild hybrid sports car built by Italian automotive manufacturer Ferrari. Its name means "The Ferrari" in Italian, as it is intended to be the definitive Ferrari.

== Design and development ==
Nine conceptual design studies were considered for the V12 hybrid flagship in 2011, reduced to five in April 2011 (three by Ferrari Centro Stile and two by Pininfarina). Of these, two full-size concepts were built: LaFerrari Concept Manta (internal designation: 2011 Model 2) and LaFerrari Concept Tensostruttura (internal designation 2011 Model 3). These were unveiled at the Ferrari Museum in Maranello, Italy and Ferrari World in Abu Dhabi. The final design of LaFerrari is similar to the Manta concept (Model 2).

The Ferrari Centro Stile cars designed after LaFerrari have design elements reminiscent of the Tensostruttura concept (Model 3) e.g. the SF90 Stradale.

== Variants ==
=== LaFerrari (2013–2016) ===
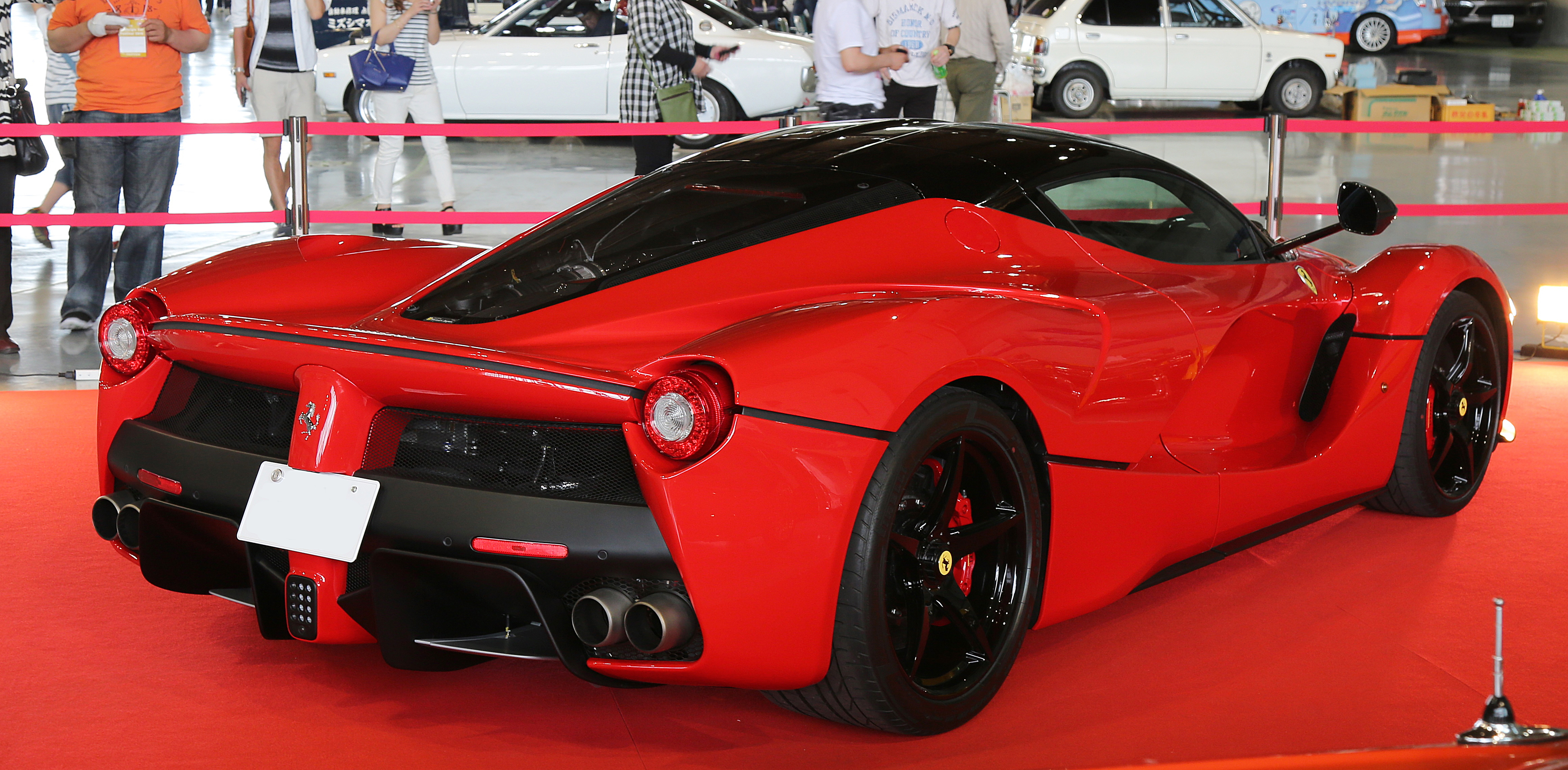
Rear view

LaFerrari is based on findings from testing of the FXX development prototype and on research being conducted by the Millechili Project at the University of Modena. Association with the Millechili Project led to speculation during development that the car would weigh under 1,000 kg (2,205 lb), but a dry weight of around 1,255 kg (2,767 lb) was claimed. Only 499 units were produced, and each cost more than 1 million Euros.

The car was unveiled at the 2013 Geneva Auto Show, followed by Auto Shanghai 2013, 2013 Tour Auto Optic 2000, 2013 Supercar Chronicle, Italian Chamber of Commerce in Japan.

=== LaFerrari Aperta (2016–2018) ===
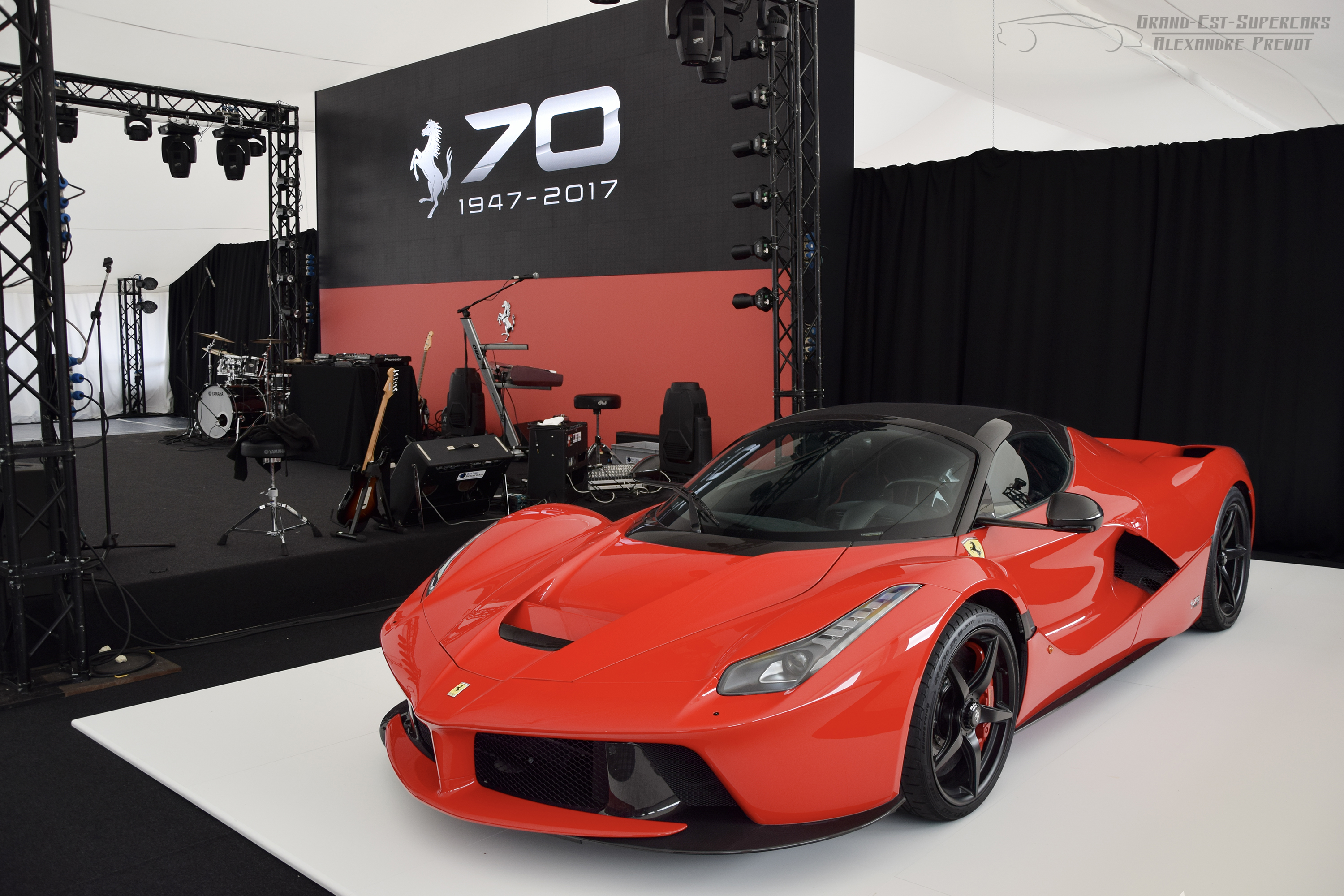
LaFerrari Aperta

Aperta is the open-top version of LaFerrari. Initially, 200 cars were sold with an additional nine reserved for use during the Ferrari 70th Anniversary celebrations. One more unit was later sold by auction. The Aperta comes with a removable carbon-fiber hardtop and a removable canvas soft top. Other changes include more efficient powertrain's control electronics, re-angled radiators to direct airflow out along the underbody rather than over the bonnet, a longer front air dam to help increase downforce, an L-shaped flap on the upper corner of each windscreen pillar to reduce compression on the rear of the cabin in the absence of a roof, different door opening angles with different wheel arches and a new carbon-fiber insert allowing the doors to rotate.

The car was unveiled at the 2016 Paris Motor Show. Like past open-top Ferrari models, it uses the Aperta label to denote its removable roof. According to Ferrari, all 200 units were already pre-sold to customers via invitation.

=== FXX-K (2015–2017) ===
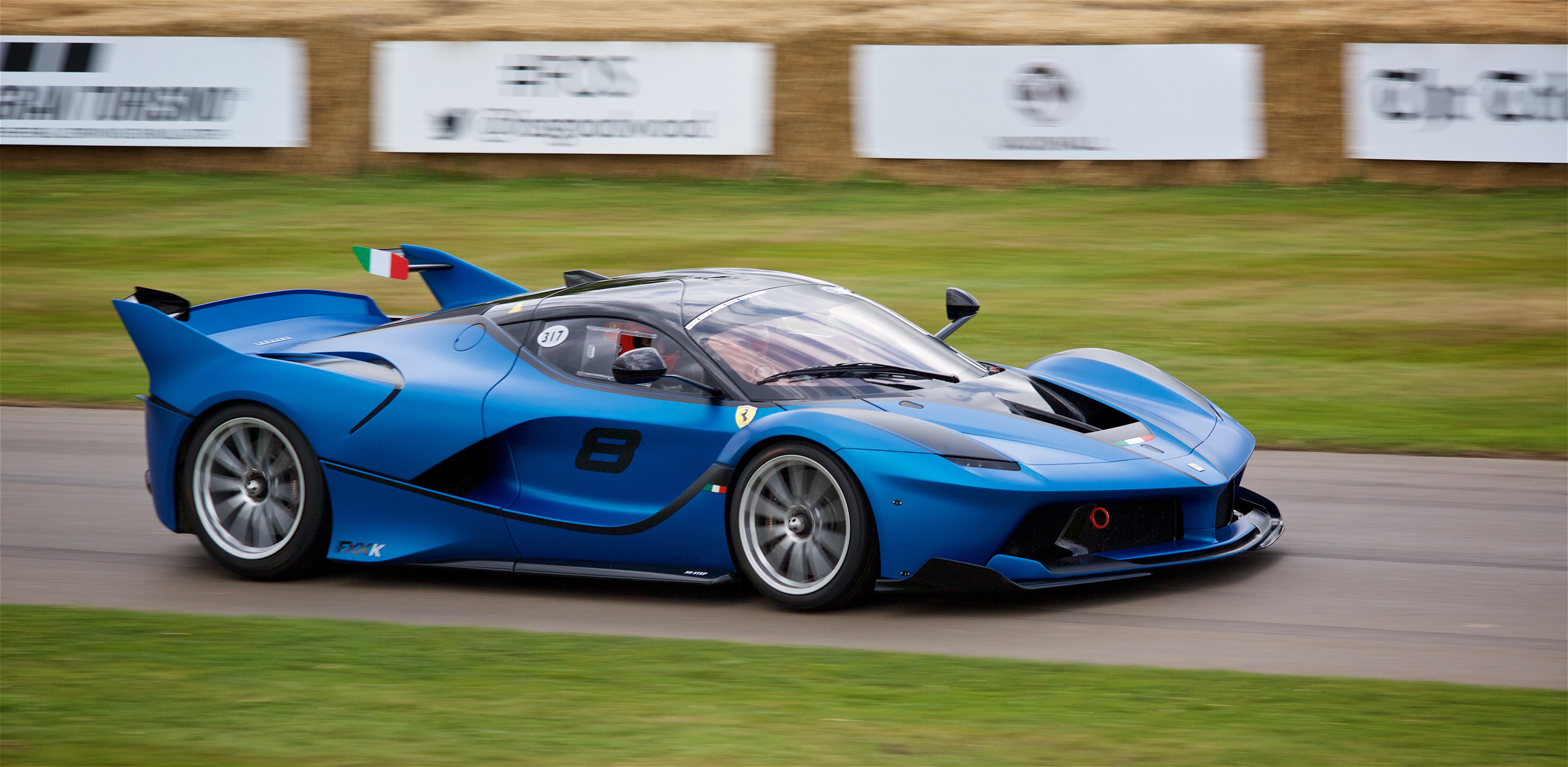
FXX-K at the Goodwood Festival of Speed

The FXX-K is Ferrari's research and development vehicle based on the LaFerrari. The K in the new car's name refers to the kinetic energy recovery system (KERS) which is used to maximize performance. The FXX-K is not intended to be used in competition and was developed to give an uncompromising experience to the driver.

The FXX-K was unveiled at the Yas Marina Circuit in late 2014. A total of 40 units were built.

==== Specifications ====
The hybrid powerplant used in the FXX-K has a total power output of 1,050 PS (772 kW; 1,036 hp) and over 900 N⋅m (664 lb⋅ft), of which 860 PS (633 kW; 848 hp) are delivered by the V12 ICE and 190 PS (140 kW; 187 hp) by the electric motor. The V12 engine has been tuned for track use as well as the HY-KERS system. With a dry weight of 1,165 kg (2,568 lb), the FXX-K has extremely effective downforce generation of 540 kg (1,190 lb) at 200 km/h (124 mph). The car has four driving modes: Qualify (maximum performance on short distance), Long Run (for long-distance driving), Fast Charge (for faster recharging of the battery) and Manual Boost, that uses all of the power of the engine and batteries for maximum torque, cornering and speed. It has F1-based technology, including the E-Diff electronic differential, F1-Trac traction control and racing ABS brakes, all controlled from the centre console (Manettino). Like the preceding FXX and 599XX, the FXX-K is a part of Ferrari's Client Test Driver program, that allows owners of XX cars to drive at special tracks, collecting data for use in future Ferrari road and race cars. The front of the car has a large splitter and twin-profile spoiler, the headlights are very small for improving aerodynamics. On the rear, the tail is higher and includes an electronically operated spoiler with a tail fin and a small wing at the end of each fin to maximize the downforce. The car has a top speed of 350 km/h (217 mph).

=== FXX-K Evo (2017–2019) ===
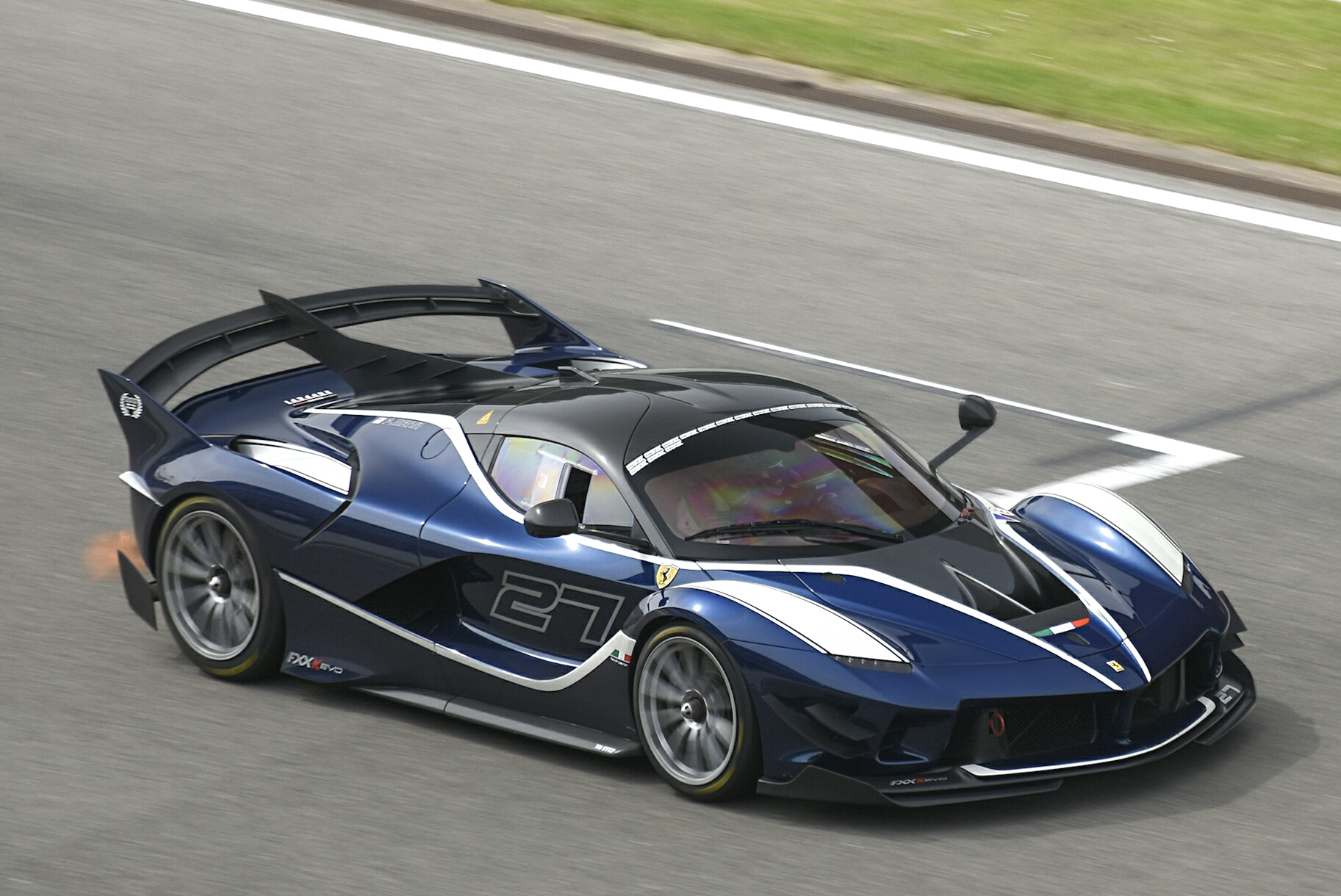
FXX-K Evo

The FXX-K Evo was unveiled at the Ferrari Finali Mondiali 2017 on 28 October 2017 at Stazione Leopolda in Florence during the Ferrari 70th Anniversary celebration. It is an aerodynamic package, available for the existing Ferrari FXX-K. The FXX-K Evo allows the car to produce 23% more downforce than the standard FXX-K and 75% more than the road-legal LaFerrari due to a modified front fascia, a large rear wing and underbody diffusers. Performance and weight figures are unknown but a 90 kg (198 lb) decrease in weight is said to be estimated by the manufacturer.

On 29 August 2018, the FXX-K Evo (number 54) was shown again to the public during the Formula 1 Milan Festival 2018 led by former Formula 1 driver Giancarlo Fisichella.

== Specifications ==
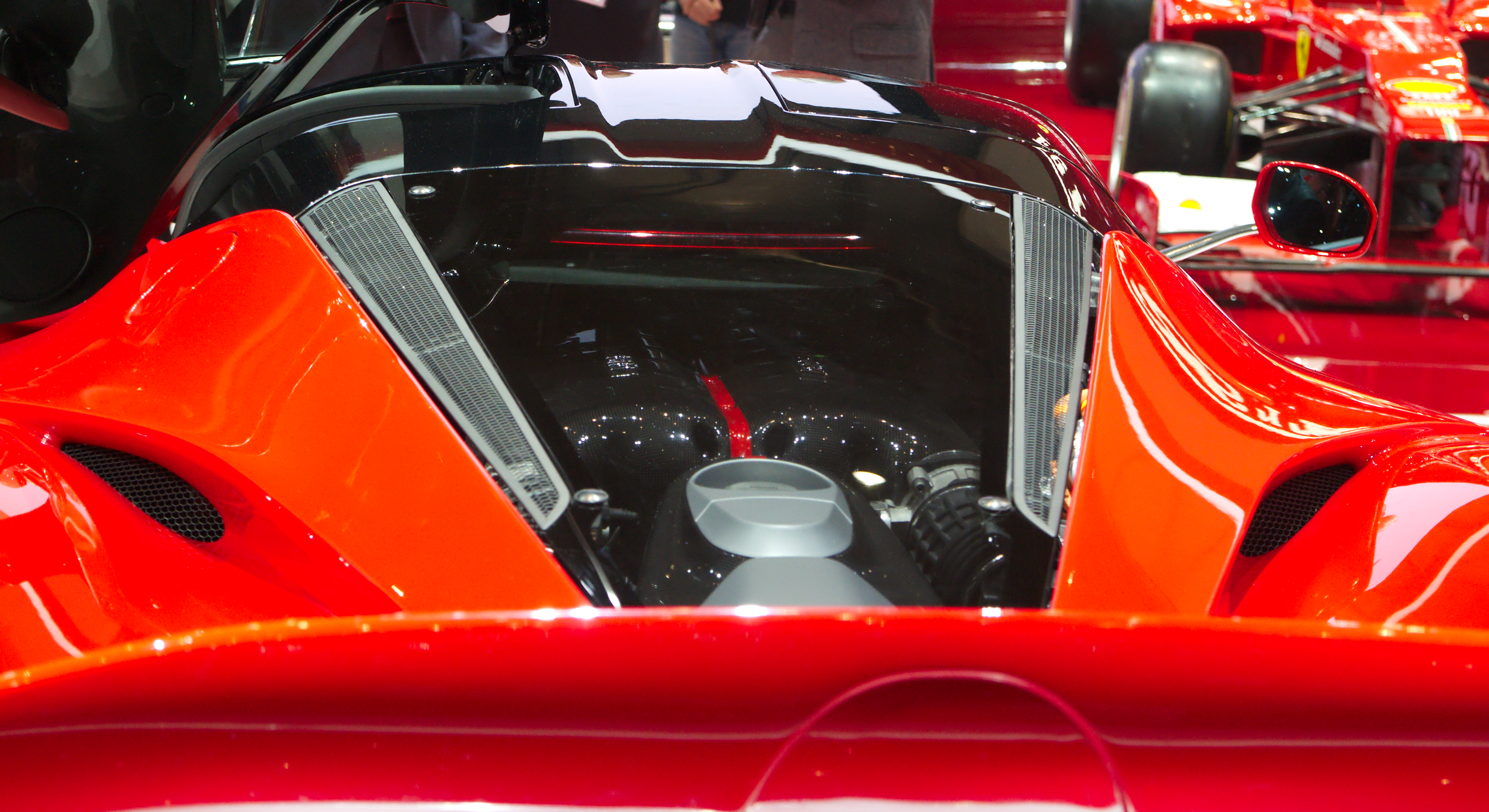
Engine compartment

LaFerrari is the first full hybrid produced by the Italian automotive marque, providing the highest power output of any Ferrari road car whilst decreasing fuel consumption by 40 per cent. LaFerrari's internal combustion petrol engine is a longitudinally rear mid-mounted Ferrari F140 direct fuel injected 65° V12 engine with a displacement of 6,262 cc (6.3 L) generating a maximum power output of 800 PS (588 kW; 789 hp) at 9,000 rpm and 700 N⋅m (516 lb⋅ft) of torque at 6,750 rpm, supplemented by a 163 PS (120 kW; 161 hp) KERS unit (called HY-KERS), which provides short bursts of extra power. The KERS system adds extra power to the combustion engine's power output level for a total of 963 PS (708 kW; 950 hp) and a combined torque of 900 N⋅m (664 lb⋅ft). Ferrari claims CO_{2} emissions of 330 g/km. The engine's bore X stroke is 94 mm × 75.2 mm (3.70 in × 2.96 in) with a compression ratio of 13.5:1 and a specific power output of 94 kW (128 PS) per liter. It is mated to a 7-speed dual-clutch transmission.

=== Equipment ===
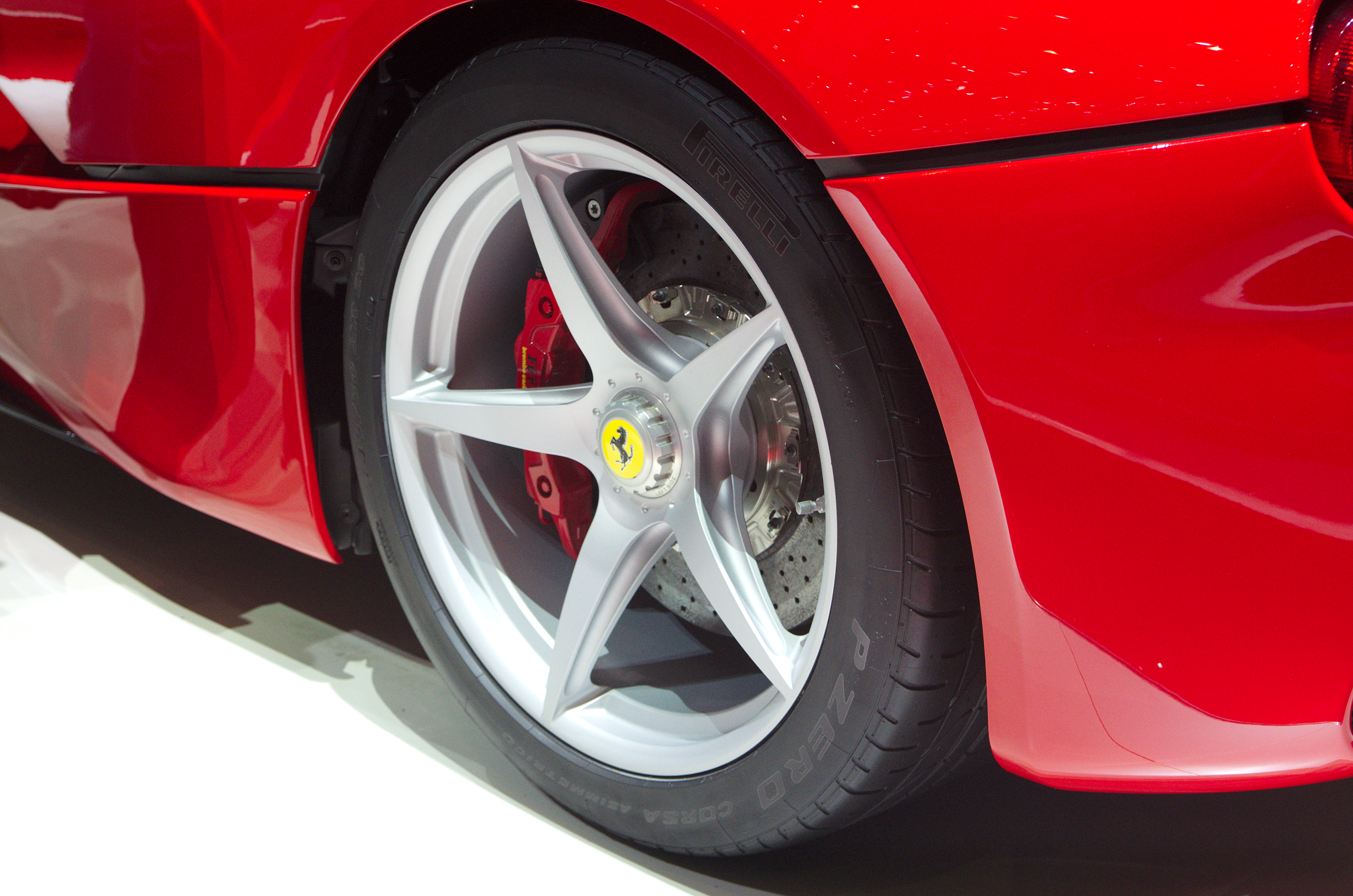
The five-spoke alloy wheels of LaFerrari, showing the carbon-ceramic braking system

The car is equipped with carbon-ceramic Brembo brake discs at the front (398 mm) and rear (380 mm), The car is equipped with Pirelli P Zero Corsa tires measuring 265/30 R 19 (front) and 345/30 R 20 (rear) respectively.

The car uses a carbon fibre monocoque structure designed by Ferrari's F1 technical director Rory Byrne, with a claimed 27 per cent more torsional rigidity and 22 per cent more beam stiffness than its predecessor. It has a double wishbone suspension in the front and a multi-link suspension in the rear.

LaFerrari has several electronic controls including an electronic stability control, high-performance ABS/EBD (anti-lock braking system/electronic brake distribution), EF1-Trac F1 electronic traction control integrated with the hybrid system, E-Diff 3 third-generation electronic differential, SCM-E Frs magnetorheological damping with twin solenoids (Al-Ni tube), and active aerodynamics, which are controlled by 21 of LaFerrari's onboard computers, to enable maximum performance. The body computer system is developed by Magneti Marelli Automotive Lighting.

=== Performance ===
Ferrari states that the car has a top speed in excess of 350 km/h (220 mph). It can accelerate 0–100 km/h (0–62 mph) in 2.6 seconds, 0–200 km/h (0–124 mph) in under 6.9 seconds, and 0–300 km/h (0–186 mph) in 15 seconds were announced by Ferrari. However, the 0–300 figure was later debunked by multiple sources. Its verified 0–300 time is 21.99 seconds. Ferrari also claims that the car has lapped its Fiorano Test Circuit in 1:19.70.

=== Design ===
The design of the V12 flagship received no input from Pininfarina, which made it the first Ferrari since the Bertone-styled 1973 Dino 308 GT4 not to have Pininfarina bodywork or another styling. This decision was a rare exception to the collaboration between Ferrari and Pininfarina that began in 1951. Ferrari stated at the time that there were no plans to end business relations with Pininfarina. However, shortly after this statement the two companies split and every new production Ferrari model since the LaFerrari has been designed solely by Ferrari's in-house design center Centro Stile Ferrari.

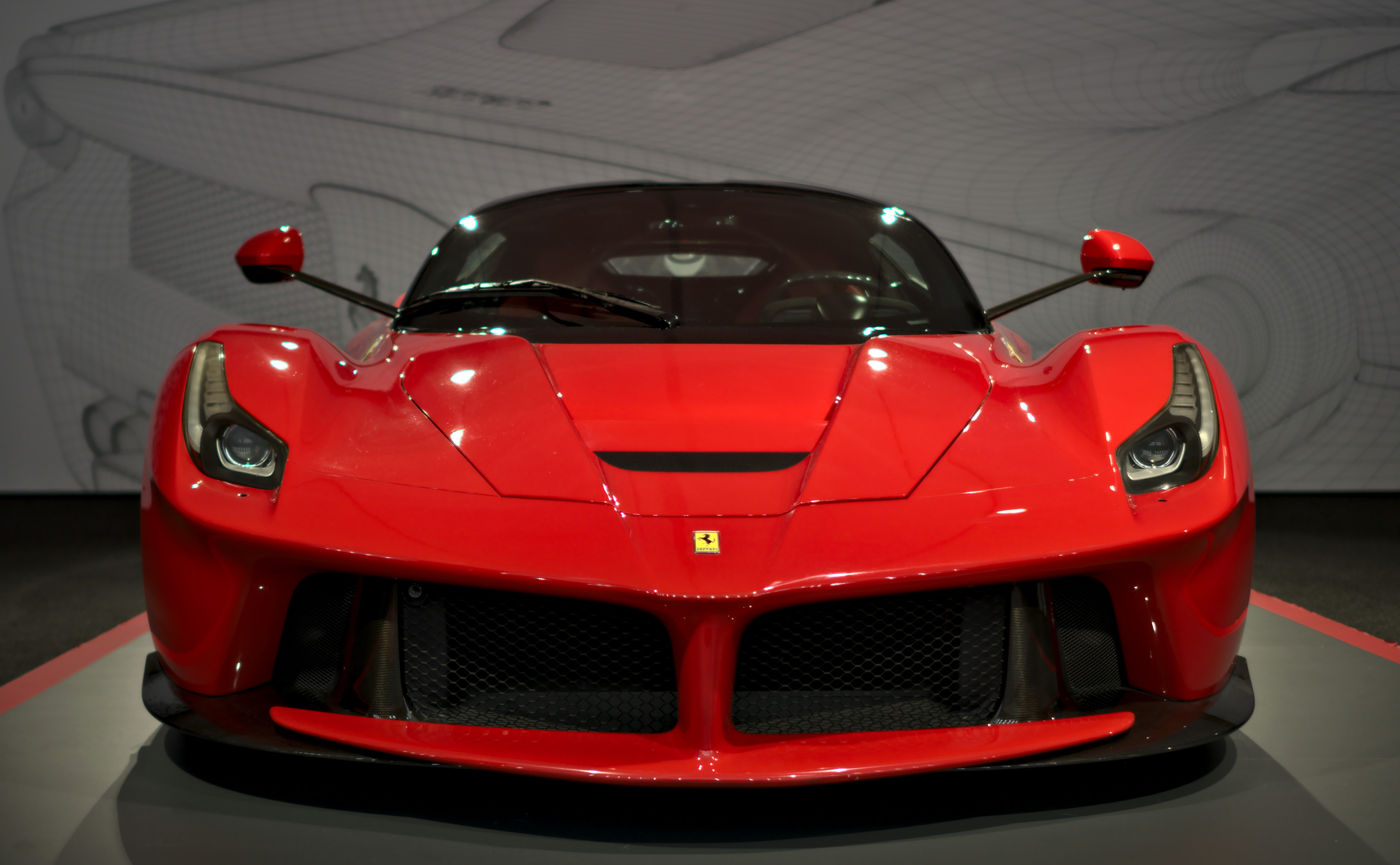
Front view of LaFerrari

The steering wheel has integrated controls and paddle-shifters directly fixed to the steering column, a solution that allows better use in all conditions. The "bridge" which exists between the two seats, designed like a suspended wing, is home to other instruments linked to the dual-clutch gearbox. The instrumentation consists of a 12.3-inch (310 mm) TFT display with the option to choose between two layouts and can host data from the telemetry system.

== Recall ==
LaFerrari coupés were offered a replacement fuel tank due to the possible incorrect adhesion of a layer of paint on the fuel tank leading to a possible fire.

Eighty-five LaFerrari coupés between 2014 and 2015 model years were recalled due to headrests from Lear's L32 seat failing to absorb the required amount of energy, and the tyre-pressure monitoring system displaying the wrong message when a tire suffered a puncture.

An additional recall was issued in 2015, due to issues with a driver's side airbag assembly.

== Auction history ==
The production of the 500th LaFerrari coupé was announced on 31 August 2016. The vehicle was to be sold at auction to benefit the people of central Italy affected by the August 2016 Central Italy earthquake on 24 August 2016. Ultimately, it was put up for auction on 3 December 2016, by RM Sotheby's at the Ferrari Finali Mondiali weekend at Daytona International Speedway. All proceeds went to the National Italian American Foundation's Earthquake Relief Fund. Sales proceeds amounted to US$7 million.

In 2017, the last unit of LaFerrari Aperta was auctioned for charity for US$10 million.

== Marketing ==
Hublot Manufacture produced 60 MP-05 "LaFerrari" hand-wound tourbillon wristwatches inspired by LaFerrari coupé. The watch has 50 days of power reserve due to the usage of 11 barrels.

== See also ==
- List of production cars by power output
