= Ferrari =

Italian luxury sports car manufacturer

Ferrari S.p.A.

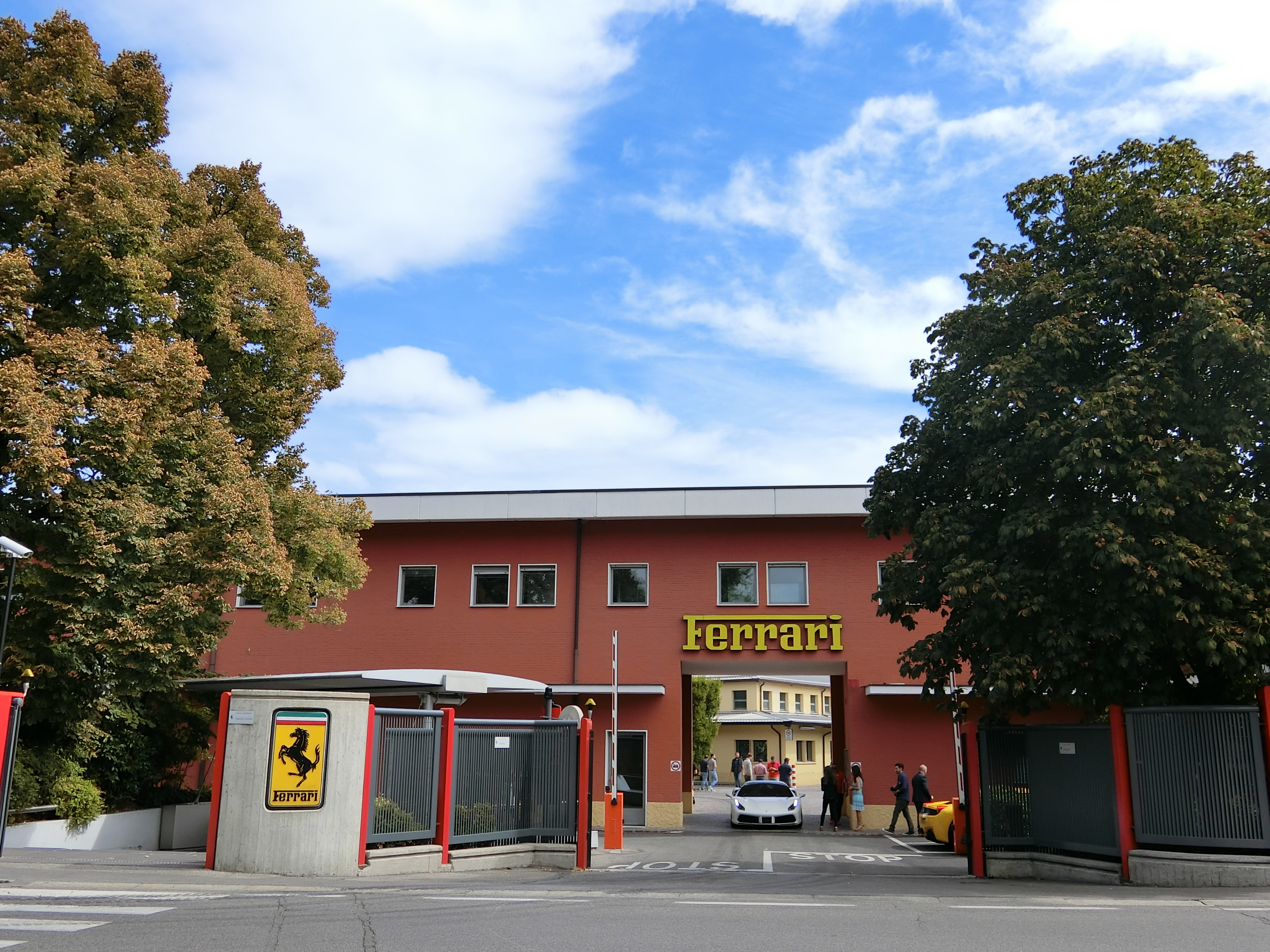
- Headquarters in Maranello, Italy
- Type: Public (S.p.A.)
- Traded as: BIT: RACE; NYSE: RACE; FTSE MIB component; Euro Stoxx 50 component
- Industry: Automotive
- Founded: 13 September 1939; 87 years ago in Modena, Italy (as Auto Avio Costruzioni)
- Founder: Enzo Ferrari
- Headquarters: Maranello, Emilia-Romagna, Italy Modena, Emilia-Romagna, Italy (seat); 44°31′57″N 10°51′52″E
- Area served: Worldwide
- Key people: John Elkann (executive chairman); Piero Ferrari (vice chairman); Benedetto Vigna (CEO)
- Products: Sports cars, luxury cars
- Production output: ▲13,752 units shipped (2024)
- Revenue: ▲€7.146 billion (2025)
- Net income: ▲€1.597 billion (2025)
- Owners: Exor (24.65% equity; 36.48% voting rights); Piero Ferrari (10.48% equity; 15.51% voting rights); Public (58.8% equity; 48.01% voting rights)
- Number of employees: ▲5,718 (2025)
- Divisions: Scuderia Ferrari
- Website: ferrari.com

Ferrari S.p.A. (/fəˈrɑːri/; Italian: [ferˈraːri]) is an Italian luxury sports car manufacturer based in Maranello, Italy. Founded in 1939 by Enzo Ferrari (1898–1988), the company built its first car in 1940, adopted its current name in 1945, and began to produce its current line of road cars in 1947. Ferrari became a public company in 1960, and from 1963 to 2014, it was a subsidiary of Fiat S.p.A. It was spun off from Fiat's successor entity, Fiat Chrysler Automobiles, in 2016. The company currently offers a large model range which includes several supercars, grand tourers, and one SUV. Many early Ferraris, dating to the 1950s and 1960s, have been amongst the most expensive cars sold at auction.

Throughout its history, the company has been noted for its continued participation in racing, especially in Formula One, where its team, Scuderia Ferrari, is the series' single oldest and most successful. Scuderia Ferrari has raced since 1929, first in Grand Prix events and later in Formula One, where it holds many records. Historically, Ferrari was also highly active in sports car racing, beginning in 1947, where its cars took many wins in races such as the Mille Miglia, Targa Florio and 24 Hours of Le Mans, as well as several overall victories in the World Sportscar Championship. Scuderia Ferrari fans, commonly called tifosi, are known for their passion and loyalty to the team.

Ferrari is one of the world's strongest brands, and it maintains a brand image built around racing heritage, luxury, and exclusivity. The company is publicly traded, with significant ownership, by Piero Ferrari, and Exor N.V. As of May 2023, Ferrari is also one of the largest car manufacturers by market capitalisation, with a value of approximately US$85.5 billion.

== History ==
=== Early history ===
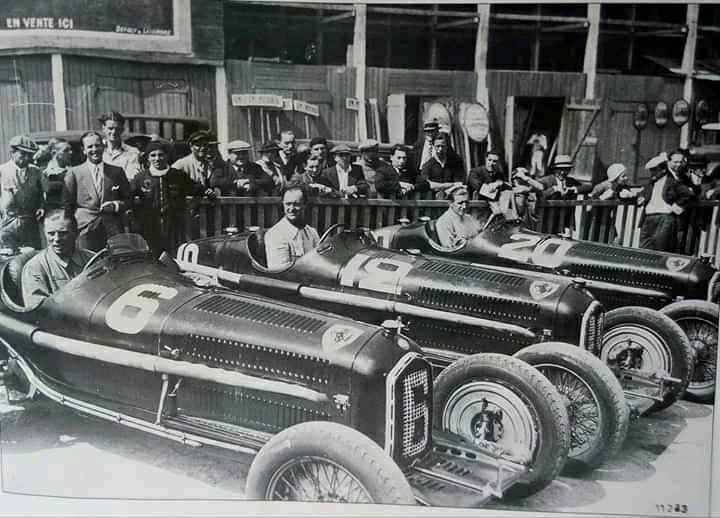
Three Scuderia Ferrari cars in 1934, all Alfa Romeo P3s. Drivers, left to right: Achille Varzi, Louis Chiron, and Carlo Felice Trossi.

Enzo Ferrari, formerly a salesman and racing driver for Alfa Romeo, founded Scuderia Ferrari, a racing team, in 1929. Originally intended to service gentleman drivers and other amateur racers, Alfa Romeo's withdrawal from racing in 1933, combined with Enzo's connections within the company, turned Scuderia Ferrari into its unofficial representative on the track. Alfa Romeo supplied racing cars to Ferrari, who eventually amassed some of the best drivers of the 1930s and won many races before the team's liquidation in 1937.

Late in 1937, Scuderia Ferrari was liquidated and absorbed into Alfa Romeo, but Enzo's disagreements with upper management caused him to leave in 1939. He used his settlement to found his own company, where he intended to produce his own cars. He called the company "Auto Avio Costruzioni", and headquartered it in the facilities of the old Scuderia Ferrari; due to a noncompete agreement with Alfa Romeo, the company could not use the Ferrari name for another four years. The company produced a single car, the Auto Avio Costruzioni 815, which participated in only one race before the outbreak of World War II. During the war, Enzo's company produced aircraft engines and machine tools for the Italian military; the contracts for these goods were lucrative, and provided the new company with a great deal of capital. In 1943, under threat of Allied bombing raids, the company's factory was moved to Maranello. Though the new facility was nonetheless bombed twice, Ferrari remains in Maranello to this day.

=== Under Enzo Ferrari ===
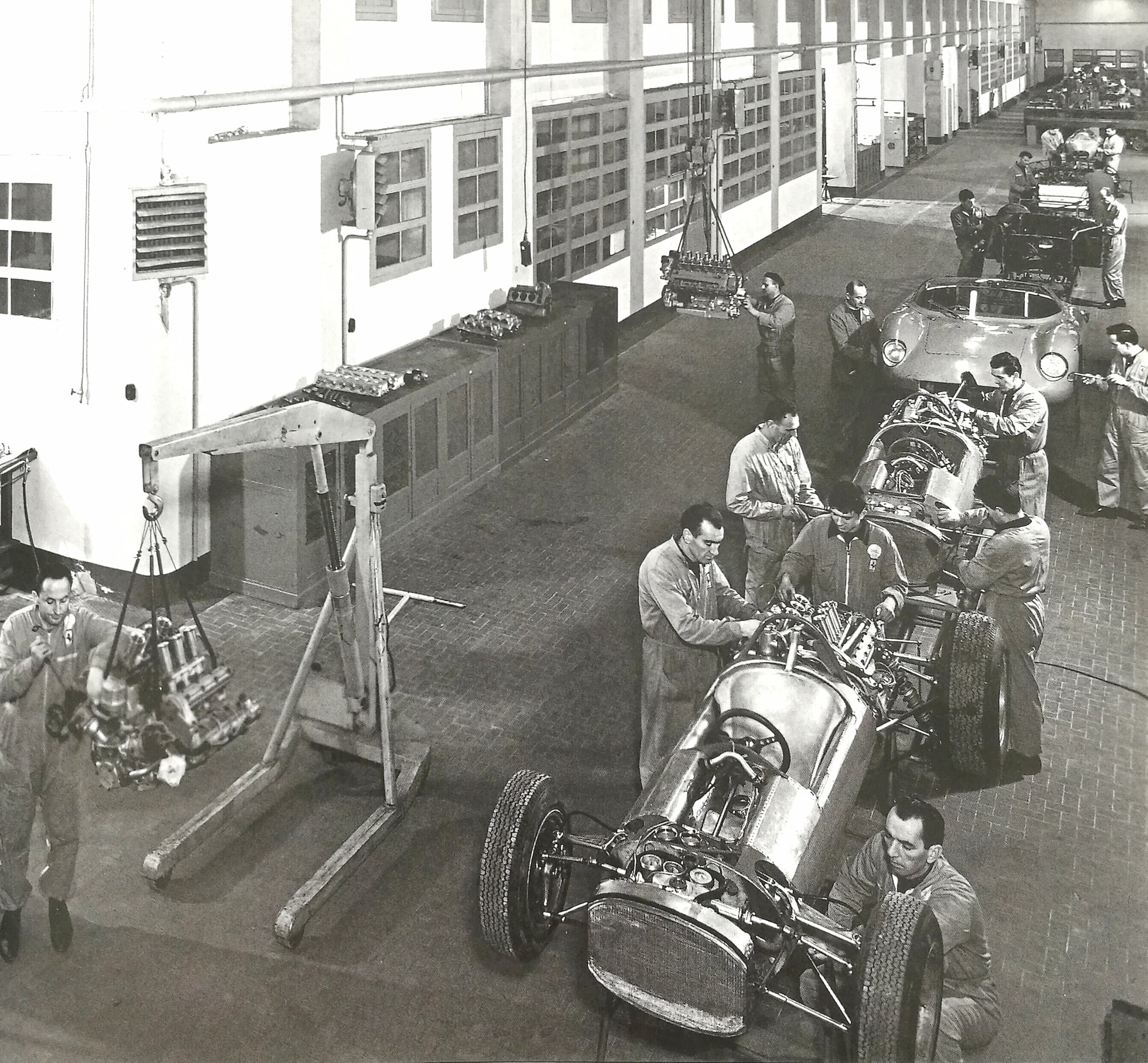
Ferrari's factory in the early 1960s: everything in its production line was handmade by machinists, who followed technical drawings with extreme precision. Much of this work is now done by industrial robots.

In 1945, Ferrari adopted its current name. Work started promptly on a new V12 engine that would power the 125 S, which was the marque's first car, and many subsequent Ferraris. The company saw success in motorsport almost as soon as it began racing: the 125 S won many races in 1947, and several early victories, including the 1949 24 Hours of Le Mans and 1951 Carrera Panamericana, helped build Ferrari's reputation as a high-quality automaker. Ferrari won several more races in the coming years, and early in the 1950s its road cars were already a favourite of the international elite. Ferrari produced many families of interrelated cars, including the America, Monza, and 250 series, and the company's first series-produced car was the 250 GT Coupé, beginning in 1958.

In 1960, Ferrari was reorganized as a public company. It soon began searching for a business partner to handle its manufacturing operations: it first approached Ford in 1963, though negotiations fell through; later talks with Fiat, who bought 50% of Ferrari's shares in 1969, were more successful. In the second half of the decade, Ferrari also produced two cars that upended its more traditional models: the 1967 Dino 206 GT, which was its first mass-produced mid-engined road car, (Note: The Dino 206 GT was preceded by the 250 LM Stradale and 365 P Berlinetta Speciale. Both were based on preexisting mid-engined racing cars, and were produced in extremely limited numbers.) and the 1968 365 GTB/4, which possessed streamlined styling that modernised Ferrari's design language. The Dino in particular was a decisive movement away from the company's conservative engineering approach, where every road-going Ferrari featured a V12 engine placed in the front of the car, and it presaged Ferrari's full embrace of mid-engine architecture, as well as V6 and V8 engines, in the 1970s and 1980s.

=== Contemporary ===
Enzo Ferrari died in 1988, an event that saw Fiat expand its stake to 90%. The last car that he personally approved—the F40—expanded on the flagship supercar approach first tried by the 288 GTO four years earlier. Enzo was succeeded in 1991 by Luca di Montezemolo, under whose 23-year-long chairmanship the company greatly expanded. Between 1991 and 2014, he increased the profitability of Ferrari's road cars nearly tenfold, both by increasing the range of cars offered and through limiting the total number produced. Montezemolo's chairmanship also saw an expansion in licensing deals, a drastic improvement in Ferrari's Formula One performance (not least through the hiring of Michael Schumacher and Jean Todt), and the production of three more flagship cars: the F50, the Enzo, and the LaFerrari. In addition to his leadership of Ferrari, Montezemolo was also the chairman of Fiat proper between 2004 and 2010.

After Montezemolo resigned, he was replaced in quick succession by many new chairmen and CEOs. He was succeeded first by Sergio Marchionne, who would oversee Ferrari's initial public offering and subsequent spin-off from Fiat Chrysler Automobiles, and then by Louis Camilleri as CEO and John Elkann as chairman. Beginning in 2021, Camilleri was replaced as CEO by Benedetto Vigna, who has announced plans to develop Ferrari's first fully electric model. During this period, Ferrari has expanded its production, owing to a global increase in wealth, while becoming more selective with its licensing deals.

== Motorsport ==
Since the company's beginnings, Ferrari has been involved in motorsport. Through its works team, Scuderia Ferrari, it has competed in a range of categories including Formula One and sports car racing, though the company has also worked in partnership with other teams.

=== Grand Prix and Formula One racing ===
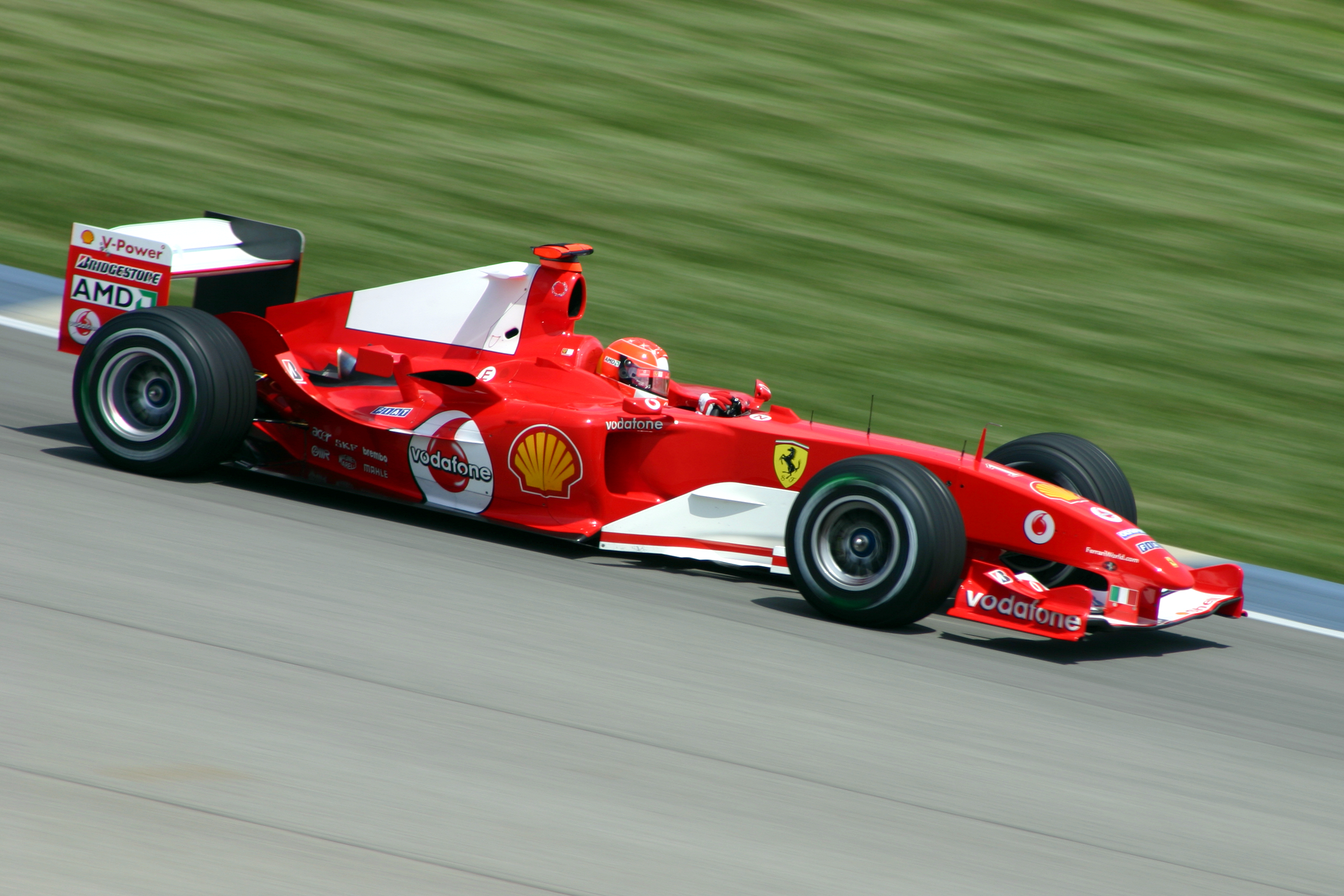
A Ferrari F2004 Formula One car, driven by Michael Schumacher. Schumacher is one of the most decorated drivers in F1 history.

Scuderia Ferrari has been continuously active since the very beginning of Formula One: since 1952 it has fielded fifteen champion drivers, won sixteen Constructors' Championships, and accumulated more race victories, 1–2 finishes, podiums, pole positions, fastest laps and points than any other team in F1 history.

The earliest Ferrari entity, Scuderia Ferrari, was created in 1929—ten years before the founding of Ferrari proper—as a Grand Prix racing team. It was affiliated with automaker Alfa Romeo, for whom Enzo had worked in the 1920s. Alfa Romeo supplied racing cars to Ferrari, which the team then tuned and adjusted to their desired specifications. Scuderia Ferrari was highly successful in the 1930s: between 1929 and 1937 the team fielded such top drivers as Antonio Ascari, Giuseppe Campari, and Tazio Nuvolari, and won 144 out of its 225 races.

Ferrari returned to Grand Prix racing in 1947, which was at that point metamorphosing into modern-day Formula One. The team's first homebuilt Grand Prix car, the 125 F1, was first raced at the 1948 Italian Grand Prix, where its encouraging performance convinced Enzo to continue the company's costly Grand Prix racing programme. Ferrari's first victory in an F1 series was at the 1951 British Grand Prix, heralding its strong performance during the 1950s and early 1960s: between 1952 and 1964, the team took home six World Drivers' Championships and one Constructors' Championship. Notable Ferrari drivers from this era include Alberto Ascari, Juan Manuel Fangio, Phil Hill, and John Surtees.

Ferrari's initial fortunes ran dry after 1964, and its began to receive its titles in isolated sprees. Ferrari first started to slip in the late 1960s, when it was outclassed by British teams using the inexpensive, well-engineered Cosworth DFV engine. The team's performance improved markedly in the mid-1970s thanks to Niki Lauda, whose skill behind the wheel granted Ferrari a drivers' title in 1975 and 1977; similar success was accomplished in following years by the likes of Jody Scheckter and Gilles Villeneuve. The team also won the Constructors' Championship in 1982 and 1983.

Following another drought in the 1980s and 1990s, Ferrari saw a long winning streak in the 2000s, largely through the work of Michael Schumacher. After signing onto the team in 1996, Schumacher gave Ferrari five consecutive drivers' titles between 2000 and 2004; this was accompanied by six consecutive constructors' titles, beginning in 1999. Ferrari was especially dominant in the 2004 season, where it lost only three races. After Schumacher's departure, Ferrari won one more drivers' title—given in 2007 to Kimi Räikkönen—and two constructors' titles in 2007 and 2008. These are the team's most recent titles to date; as of late, Ferrari has struggled to outdo recently ascendant teams such as Red Bull, Mercedes-Benz and McLaren.

==== Ferrari Driver Academy ====
Ferrari's junior driver programme is the Ferrari Driver Academy. Begun in 2009, the initiative follows the team's successful grooming of Felipe Massa between 2003 and 2006. Drivers who are accepted into the Academy learn the rules and history of formula racing as they compete, with Ferrari's support, in feeder classes such as Formula Three and Formula 4. As of 2019, 5 out of 18 programme inductees had graduated and become F1 drivers: one of these drivers, Charles Leclerc, came to race for Scuderia Ferrari, while the other four signed to other teams. Non-graduate drivers have participated in racing development, filled consultant roles, or left the Academy to continue racing in lower-tier formulae.

=== Sports car racing ===
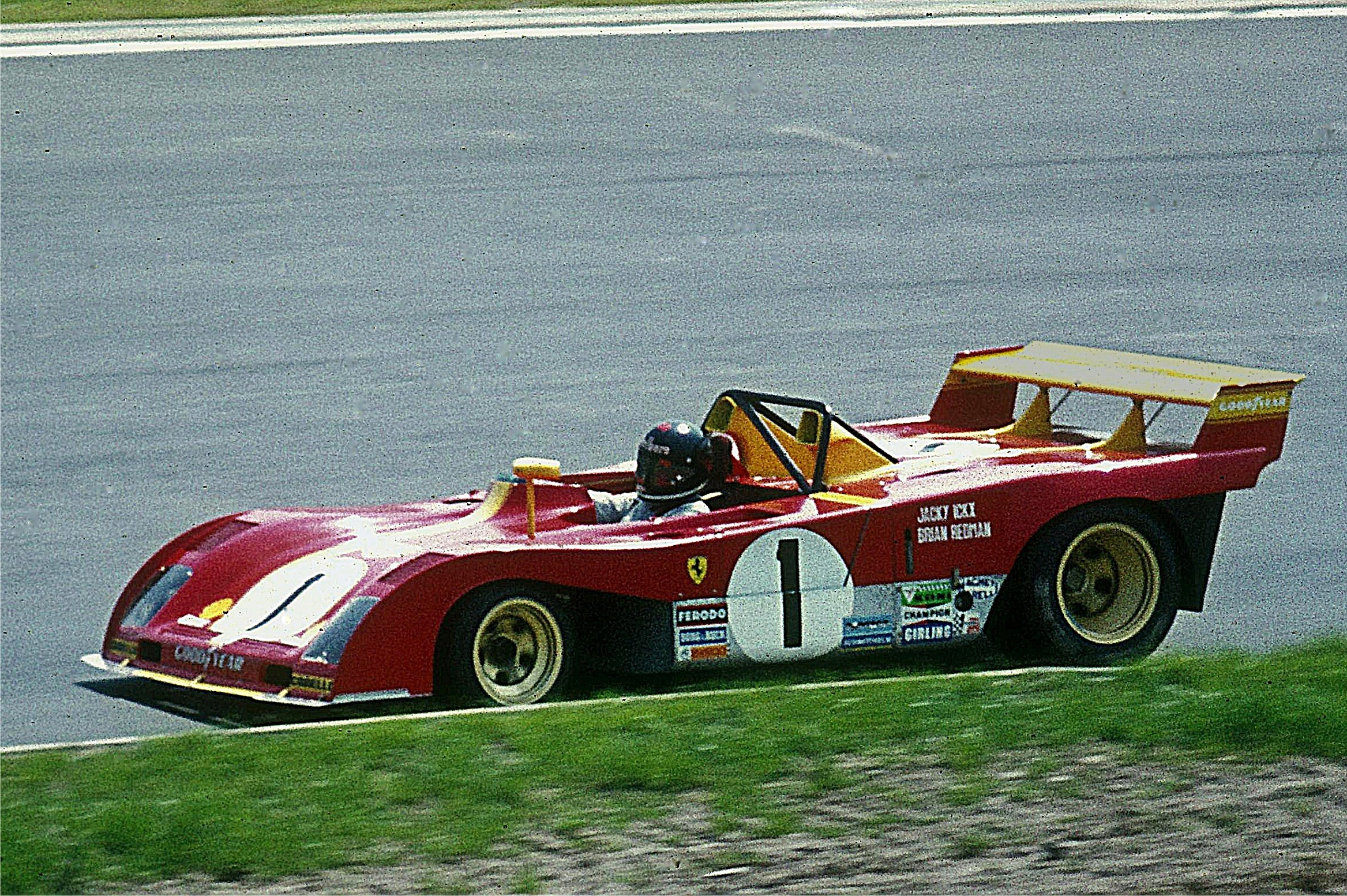
A 312 P, driven by Jacky Ickx, during Ferrari's final year in the World Sportscar Championship

Aside from an abortive effort in 1940, Ferrari began racing sports cars in 1947, when the 125 S won six out of the ten races it participated in. Ferrari continued to see similar success in the years to follow: by 1957, just ten years after beginning to compete, Ferrari had won three World Sportscar Championships, seven victories in the Mille Miglia, and two victories at the 24 Hours of Le Mans, among many other races. These races were ideal environments for the development and promotion of Ferrari's earlier road cars, which were broadly similar to their racing counterparts.

This success continued into the first half of the 1960s, when Ferrari won the WSC's 2000GT class three consecutive times and finished first at Le Mans for six consecutive years. Its winning streak at Le Mans was broken by Ford in 1966, and though Ferrari would win two more WSC titles—one in 1967 and another in 1972—poor revenue allocation, combined with languishing performance in Formula One, led the company to cease competing in sports car events in 1973. From that point onward, Ferrari helped prepare sports racing cars for privateer teams, but did not race them itself.

Since 1993 Ferrari has supported the Ferrari Challenge, a one-make championship based around the company's road lineup.

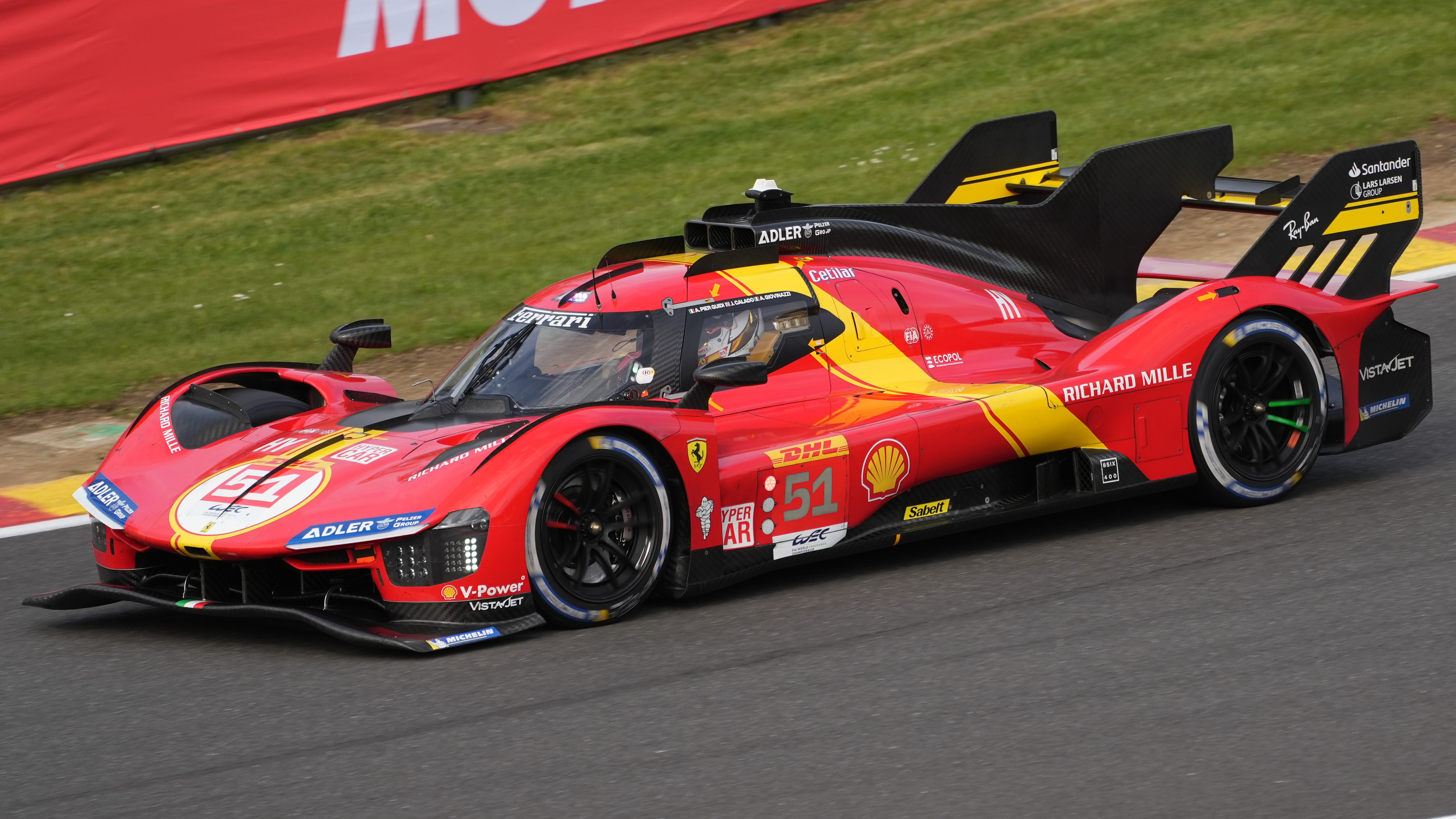
Ferrari 499P No. 51 at the 2023 6 Hours of Spa-Francorchamps

In 2023, Ferrari reentered prototype sports car racing. For the 2023 FIA World Endurance Championship, Ferrari, in partnership with AF Corse, fielded two 499P sports prototypes. To commemorate the company's return to the discipline, one of the cars was numbered "50", referencing the fifty years that had elapsed since a works Ferrari competed in an endurance race. The 499P finished first at the 2023 24 Hours of Le Mans, ending Toyota Gazoo Racing's five-year winning streak there and becoming the first Ferrari in 58 years to win the race. Ferrari repeated this feat at the 2024 24 Hours of Le Mans, marking its first consecutive victory at the race since 1965.

In 2023, the Frikadelli Racing Ferrari 296 GT3 won the Nürburgring 24 Hours overall, completing a record 162 laps (2,538 miles).

In 2025, Ferrari secured the Manufacturers' and Drivers' titles in the 2025 FIA World Endurance Championship at the season-ending 8 Hours of Bahrain; the Drivers' title went to the No. 51 crew of Alessandro Pier Guidi, James Calado and Antonio Giovinazzi.

=== Other disciplines ===
From 1932 to 1935 Scuderia Ferrari operated a motorcycle racing division, which was conceived as a way to scout and train future Grand Prix drivers. Instead of Italian motorcycles, the team used British ones manufactured by Norton and Rudge. Though Ferrari was successful on two wheels, winning three national titles and 44 overall victories, it was eventually pushed out of the discipline both by the obsolescence of pushrod motorcycle engines and broader economic troubles stemming from the Great Depression.

Ferrari formerly participated in a variety of non-F1 open-wheel series. As early as 1948, Ferrari had developed cars for Formula Two and Formula Libre events, and the company's F2 programme led directly to the creation of the Dino engine, which came to power various racing and road Ferraris. The final non-F1 formula in which Ferrari competed was the Tasman Series, wherein Chris Amon won the 1969 championship in a Dino 246 Tasmania.

At least two water speed record boats have utilized Ferrari powertrains, both of them 800kg-class hydroplanes from the early 1950s. Neither boat was built by or affiliated with Ferrari, though one of them, Arno XI, had its engine order approved directly by Enzo Ferrari. Arno XI still holds the top speed record for an 800kg hydroplane.

Since 2019, Scuderia Ferrari has participated in sim racing.

=== Race cars for other teams ===
Throughout its history, Ferrari has supplied racing cars to other entrants, aside from its own works Scuderia Ferrari team. In the 1950s and 1960s, Ferrari supplied Formula One cars to a number of private entrants and other teams. One well-known example was Tony Vandervell's team, which raced the Thinwall Special modified Ferraris before building its own Vanwall cars. The North American Racing Team's entries in the final three rounds of the 1969 season were the last occasions on which a team other than Scuderia Ferrari entered a World Championship Grand Prix with a Ferrari car.

Ferrari also supplied a V8 engine for the "Powered by Ferrari" car used in the A1 Grand Prix series beginning with the 2008–2009 season.

Ferrari operates customer racing activities, including the long-running Ferrari Challenge one-make championship and broader "Corse Clienti" programmes for track and competition cars.

== Road cars ==
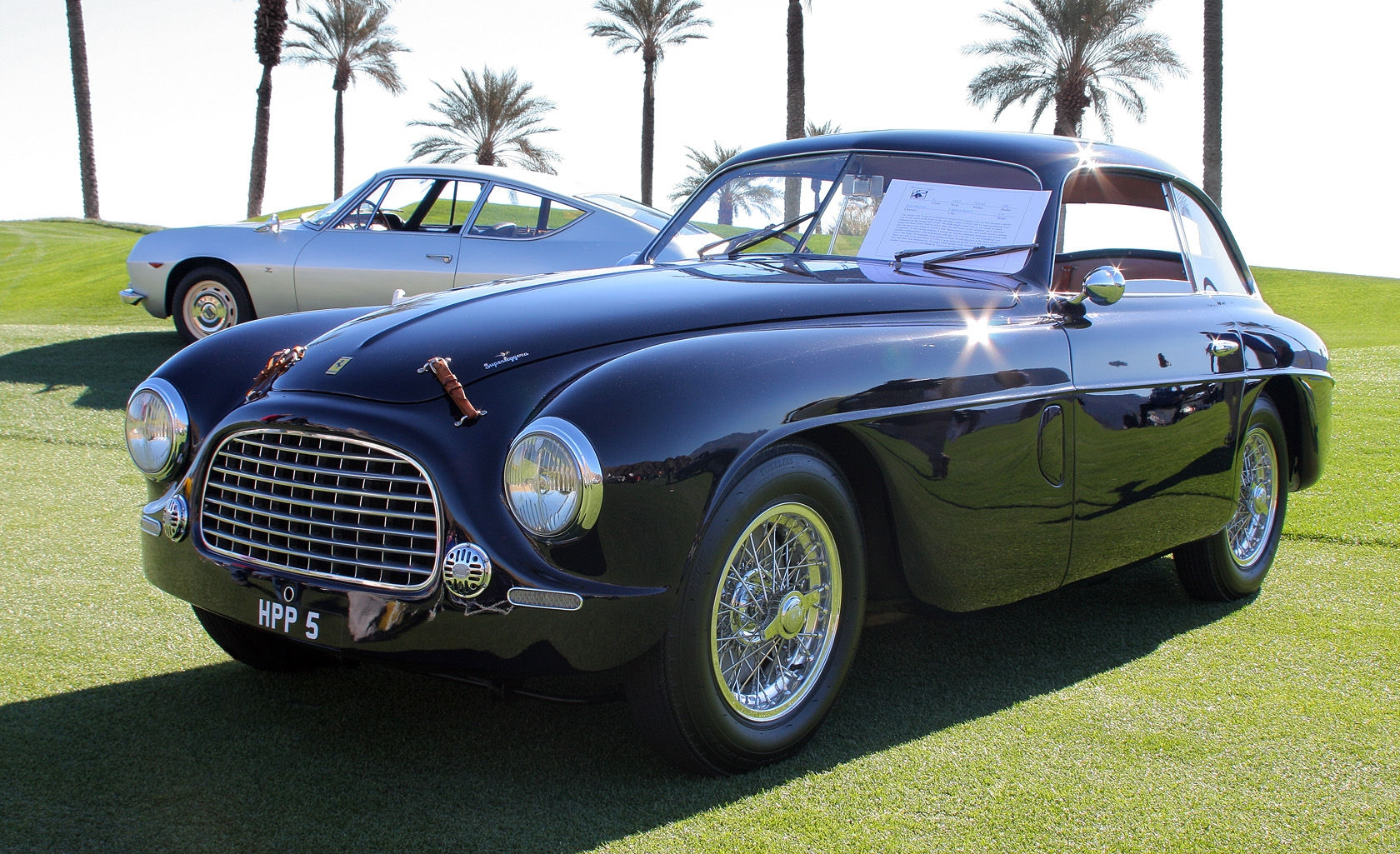
166 Inter Touring Berlinetta

The first vehicle made with the Ferrari name was the 125 S. Only two of this small two-seat sports/racing V12 car were made. In 1949, the 166 Inter was introduced marking the company's move into the grand touring road car market. The first 166 Inter was a four-seat (2+2) berlinetta coupé with bodywork designed by Carrozzeria Touring Superleggera. Road cars became the bulk of Ferrari sales. Early Ferrari road cars typically featured bodywork designed and customised by independent coachbuilders such as Vignale, Touring, Ghia, Pininfarina, Scaglietti, and Bertone.

Ferrari's early road cars were typically two-seat front-engined V12s. In the late 1960s and 1970s, Ferrari expanded into mid-engined layouts and smaller engine configurations through models developed under the Dino name, later introducing mid-engined flat-12 and V8 Ferrari-branded road cars. The mid-engine layout has continued to be used for many of Ferrari's sports cars to the present day.

Starting in the 2010s, Ferrari increasingly relied on in-house design from the Centro Stile Ferrari for road-car styling, while continuing occasional collaborations on limited projects.

The Ferrari SF90 Stradale was Ferrari's first series-production road car to feature plug-in hybrid architecture, integrating an internal combustion engine with electric motors.

Ferrari stated that it would showcase its first fully electric vehicle at its Capital Markets Day on 9 October 2025. Ferrari presented the production-ready chassis and components for the project, referred to by the company as "Ferrari Elettrica", at that event, with a fuller reveal expected later.

=== Customisation ===
In the 1950s and 1960s, clients often personalized their vehicles as they came straight from the factory. This philosophy added to the mystique of the brand at the time. Every Ferrari that came out of Maranello could be built to an individual customer's specification.

Ferrari formalized this concept with its earlier Carrozzeria Scaglietti programme. The options offered here were more typical such as racing seats, rearview cameras, and other special trim. In late 2011, Ferrari announced a significant update of this philosophy. The Tailor Made programme allows clients to work with designers in Maranello to make decisions at every step of the process. Through this program almost any trim, any exterior colour or any interior material is possible. The program carries on the original tradition and emphasizes the idea of each car being unique.

=== Supercars ===
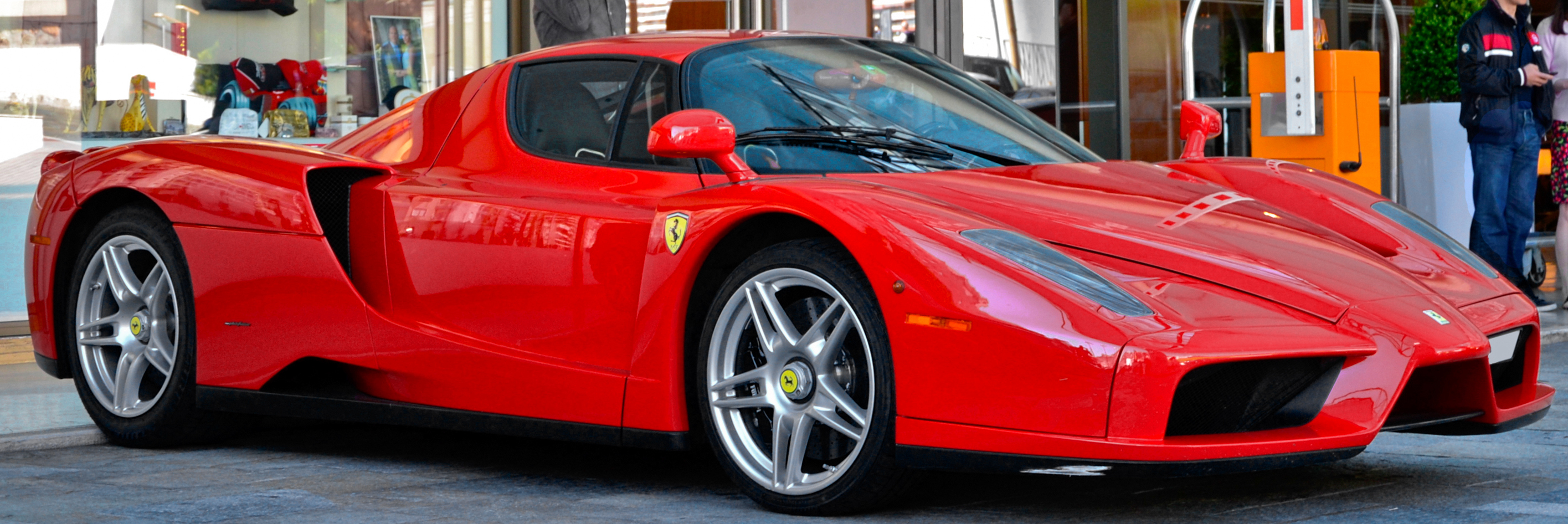
Enzo Ferrari

Many consider the 1984 288 GTO the first in the line of Ferrari flagship supercars. This pedigree is considered to extend through the F40, F50, Enzo, LaFerrari, and the F80. Prior to the unveiling of the F80, Ferrari's sixth supercar, the cars were commonly referred to as the "Big Five."

=== Concept cars and specials ===
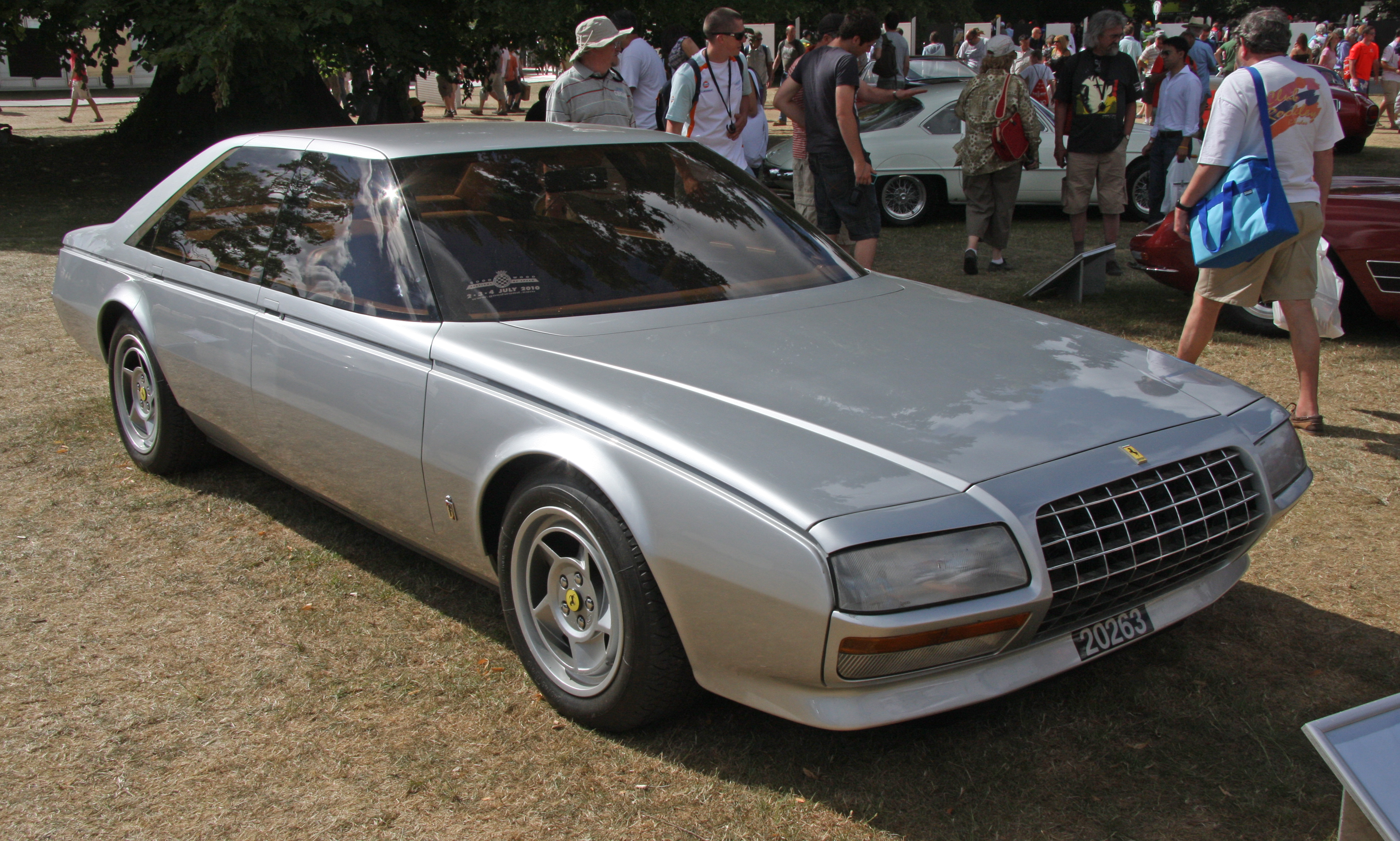
Ferrari Pinin

Ferrari has produced a handful of concept cars such as the Modulo, Mythos, and Pinin. Some of these were quite radical and never intended for production, while others showed styling elements that were later incorporated into production models. Most of Ferrari's concept cars have been collaborations with design studio Pininfarina. The most recent concept car to be produced by Ferrari themselves was the 2010 Millechili.

A number of one-off special versions of Ferrari road cars have also been produced, commissioned to coachbuilders by wealthy owners. Examples include the P4/5 and the 612 Kappa.

==== Special Projects programme ====
The Special Projects programme, also called the Portfolio Coachbuilding Program, was launched in 2008 as a way to revive the tradition of past one-off and limited production coachbuilt Ferrari models, allowing clients to work with Ferrari and top Italian coachbuilders to create bespoke bodied models based on modern Ferrari road cars. Engineering and design is done by Ferrari, sometimes in cooperation with external design houses such as Pininfarina or Fioravanti, and the vehicles receive full homologation to be road legal. Since the creation of Ferrari's in-house styling centre in 2010 though, the focus has shifted away somewhat from outside coachbuilders and more towards creating new in-house designs for clients.

The first car to be completed under this programme was the 2008 SP1, commissioned by a Japanese business executive. The second was the P540 Superfast Aperta, commissioned by an American collector.

=== Bio-fuel and hybrid cars ===
An F430 Spider that runs on ethanol was displayed at the 2008 Detroit Auto Show. At the 2010 Geneva Motor Show, Ferrari unveiled a hybrid version of their flagship 599. Called the "HY-KERS Concept", Ferrari's hybrid system adds more than 100 horsepower on top of the 599 Fiorano's 612 hp. Also in mid-2014, the flagship LaFerrari was put into production featuring a hybrid system. Ferrari introduced its first plug-in hybrid (PHEV) model in 2019 with the SF90 Stradale, followed by the 296 in 2021.

== Identity ==
=== The "Prancing Horse" ===
Tifosi flying Prancing Horse flags at the 2003 Italian Grand Prix

Ferrari's symbol is the "Prancing Horse" (Italian: Cavallino Rampante, lit. 'little prancing horse'), a prancing black horse on a yellow background. Minor details of its appearance have changed many times, but its shape has remained consistent: it is always presented either as a shield, with the Italian tricolour above the horse and the initials SF ("Scuderia Ferrari") below; or as a rectangle, replacing "SF" with the word "Ferrari" rendered in the company's trademark typeface.

Enzo Ferrari offered an account of the horse's origins. In his story, after a 1923 victory in Ravenna, the family of Francesco Baracca, a deceased flying ace who painted the emblem on his airplane, paid him a visit. Paolina de Biancoli, Francesco's mother, suggested that Ferrari adopt the horse as a good luck charm: he accepted the request, and the Prancing Horse was first used by his racing team in 1932, applied to its Alfa Romeo 8C with the addition of a canary yellow background—the "colour of Modena", Enzo's hometown. The rectangular Prancing Horse has been used since 1947, when the Ferrari 125 S—also the first Ferrari-branded sports car—became the first to wear it.

=== Colour ===
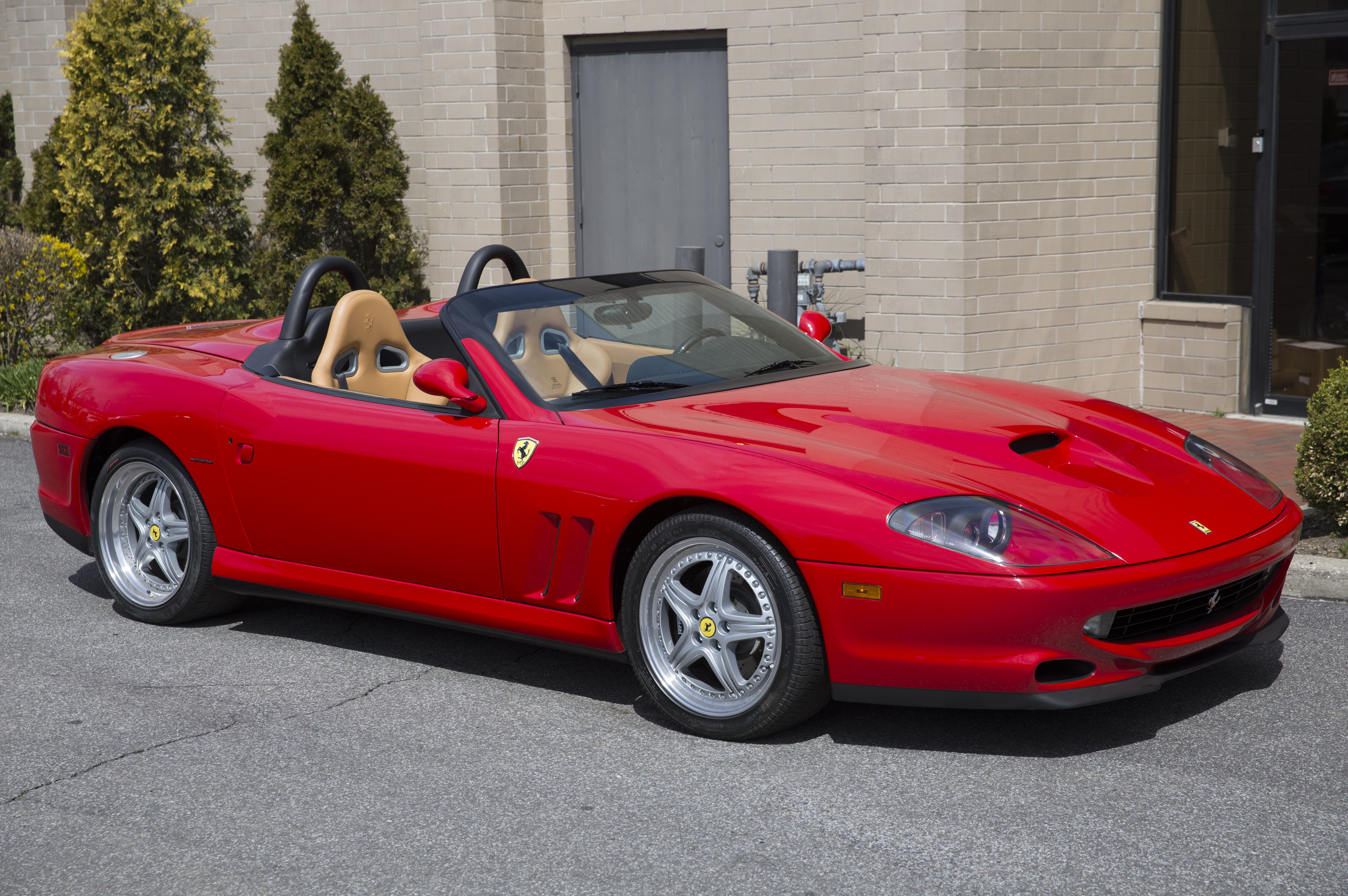
A Ferrari 550 painted in rosso corsa. Both varieties of the Prancing Horse logo are present: the shield is located in front of the door, the rectangle is on the bonnet. The horse alone can also be found on the wheels, grille, and seats.

For many years, rosso corsa ('racing red') was the required colour of all Italian racing cars. It is also closely associated with Ferrari: even after livery regulations changed, allowing race teams to deviate from their national colours, Scuderia Ferrari continued to paint its cars bright red, as it does to this day. On Ferrari's road-going cars, the colour has always been among the company's most popular choices: in 2012, 40 per cent of Ferraris left the factory painted red, while in the early 1990s the figure was even higher, at 85 per cent. Some Ferrari vehicles, such as the 288 GTO, have only been made available in red.

Although rosso corsa is the colour most associated with Ferrari, it has not always been the colour of choice. Ferraris raced by privateers have run in a rainbow of colours, and one 250 GT SWB, used as a test mule for the 250 GTO, was a rare non-red factory-backed car: it raced in blue. In a particularly noteworthy case from 1964, while protesting the FIA's homologation requirements, the company moved its racing assets to the North American Racing Team, an affiliated team based in the United States. As a result, Ferrari and the driver John Surtees won the 1964 Formula One season in American colours—blue, with a white racing stripe. By the early 2010s, red had also become less common on Ferrari's road cars, fighting with newly popular colours such as yellow, silver, and white.

Speaking to both the popularity of rosso corsa and the power of the Ferrari brand, Enzo Ferrari is reported to have once said the following: "Ask a child to draw a car, and he will certainly paint it red."

=== Brand image ===
Ferrari's brand image has been described by the Wall Street Journal as "synonymous with opulence, meticulous craftsmanship and ridiculously fast cars for nearly a century". Owing to a combination of its cars, enthusiast culture, and successful licensing deals, Ferrari was labelled the world's strongest brand by the financial consultancy Brand Finance in 2019.

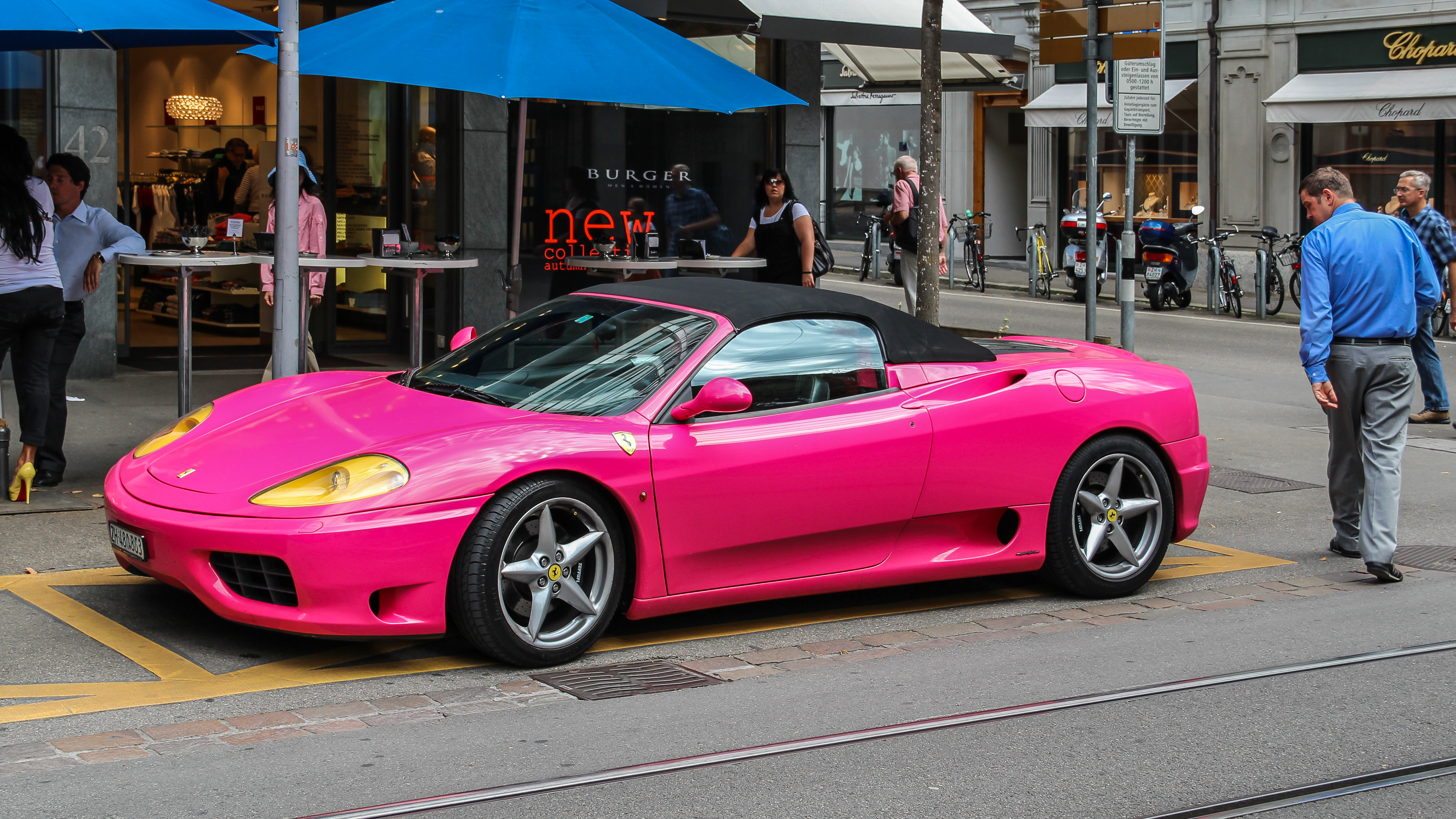
A pink Ferrari 360. Ferrari offers no pink paint from the factory, and has discouraged its customers from customising their cars in a manner contrary to the company's brand image.

Ferrari meticulously manages its brand image and public perception: it goes to great lengths to protect its trademarks, and its customers are expected to honour its rules and guidelines when caring for their cars. The company is noted for its frequent and diverse lawsuits, which have centred around such subjects as the shape of the Ferrari 250 GTO's bodywork, exclusive rights to model names (including "Testarossa" and "Purosangue"), replica vehicles, and several unsanctioned owner modifications. Via a bounty system, individuals may receive rewards for reporting counterfeit Ferrari products to the company.

Ferrari aims to cultivate an image of exclusivity and refined luxury. To facilitate this, vehicle production is deliberately limited to below customer demand, and purchasers are internally ranked based on their desirability and loyalty. Some cars may only be purchased by customers who have already owned multiple Ferraris, and the company's most exclusive supercars, such as the LaFerrari, have wait lists many times in excess of total production, with only the most loyal customers selected to purchase one. In 2015, the company's head of sales stated that the purpose of this strategy was to maintain the brand's value, and to "keep alive this dream that is called Ferrari".

Ferrari does encourage its buyers to personalise their cars, but only through official channels, which include its Tailor Made programme for bespoke trim packages and special coachbuilding initiatives for more demanding commissions. The customisation options offered through these channels are extensive, though they are always in line with Ferrari's desired branding—for example, the company offers no pink paint for its cars. In 2017, the CEO of the company's Australasia branch commented that this and similar customisations are "against the company's ethos," and that such a stance is "a brand rule. No pink. No Pokémon Ferraris!".

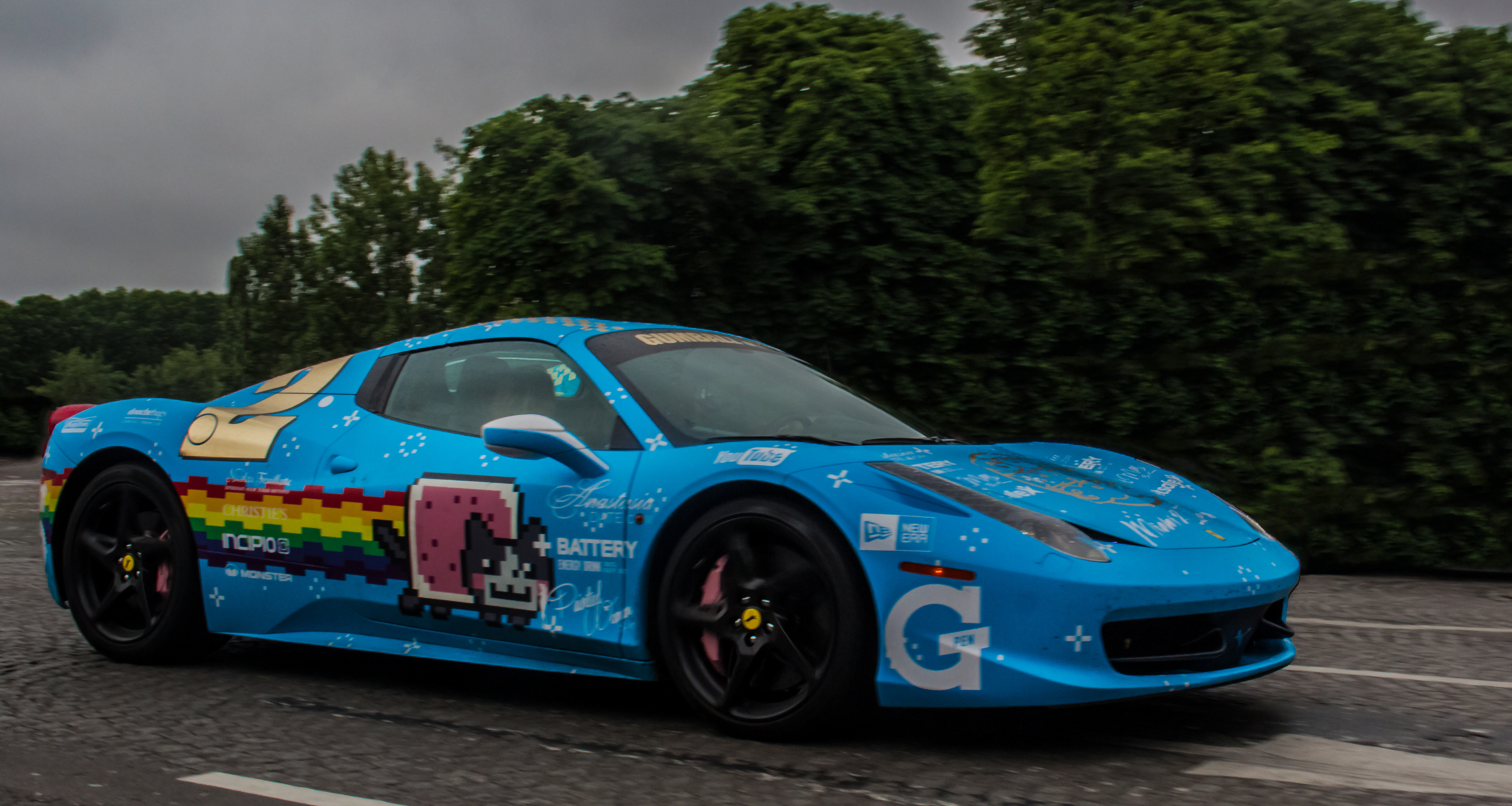
Deadmau5' customized Ferrari 458 Italia at the 2014 Gumball 3000.

Furthermore, the company places restrictions on what owners may do: various modifications are prohibited, and criticism of the company is discouraged. The company's terms of sale, designed to prevent flipping, disallow unauthorised resale within the first year of ownership; buyers must sign a contract that gives the right of first refusal to a Ferrari dealership if the car is put up for sale, so that Ferrari can select the next customer of that vehicle. Purchasers who break these rules are placed on a "blacklist", and may not be permitted to buy a Ferrari vehicle through official means.

Sometimes, Ferrari's desire to maintain its brand perception goes against the wishes of its clientele. In an incident in 2014, the musician Deadmau5 was sent a cease and desist letter regarding his highly customised 458 Italia. The car, which he called the "Purrari", possessed custom badges and a Nyan Cat-themed wrap, and was put up for sale on Craigslist. In another case, the company sued the fashion designer Philipp Plein over "distasteful" Instagram posts featuring his personal 812 Superfast. The posts, which showcased two models in suggestive positions atop the car, were seen by Ferrari as "unlawfully appropriating" the Ferrari brand to promote Plein's clothing, and as being outside Ferrari's intended brand perception.

== Corporate affairs ==
In 1963, Enzo Ferrari was approached by the Ford Motor Company about a possible buy out. Ford audited Ferrari's assets but legal negotiations and talks were unilaterally cut off by Ferrari when he realized that the deal offered by Ford would not enable him to stay at the helm of the company racing program. Henry Ford II consequently directed his racing division to negotiate with Lotus, Lola, and Cooper to build a car capable of beating Ferrari on the world endurance circuit, eventually resulting in the production of the Ford GT40 in 1964.

As the Ford deal fell through, FIAT approached Ferrari with a more flexible proposal and purchased controlling interests in the company in 1969. Enzo Ferrari retained a 10% share, which is currently owned by his son Piero Lardi Ferrari.

Ferrari has an internally managed merchandising line that licences many products bearing the Ferrari brand, including eyewear, pens, pencils, electronic goods, perfume, cologne, clothing, high-tech bicycles, watches, cell phones, and laptop computers.

Ferrari also runs a museum, the Museo Ferrari in Maranello, which displays road and race cars and other items from the company's history.

=== Formula Uomo programme ===
In 1997, Ferrari launched a long term master planned effort to improve overall corporate efficiency, production and employee happiness. The program was called Formula Uomo and became a case study in social sustainability. It took over ten years to fully implement and included over €200 million (2008) in investment.

=== Technical partnerships ===
Ferrari has had a long-standing relationship with petroleum company Shell Oil from the late 1950s to the early 1970s, and currently since 1996. Shell develops and supplies fuel and oils to the Scuderia Ferrari's Formula One and World Endurance Championship teams, as well as Ducati Corse's MotoGP and World Superbike teams. The Shell V-Power premium gasoline fuel is claimed to have been developed with the many years of technical expertise between Shell and Ferrari.

Ferrari has had agreements to supply Formula One engines to a number of other teams over the years, and (for the 2026 regulations cycle) announced an agreement to supply power units to the Cadillac entry via Andretti Formula Racing, alongside its continuing supply to Haas F1.

=== Sales history ===
As of the end of 2019, the total of Ferrari built and sold cars in its whole company history is 219,062.

In October 2023, Ferrari started accepting payment in cryptocurrency for its vehicles in the US with intentions to expand the scheme to Europe in 2024. The cryptocurrency payments will be immediately traded into traditional currency to avoid price swings.

Annual Ferrari sales to end customers (number of type-approved vehicles)

Year	Sales
1947	‡3
1948	‡5
1949	‡21
1950	‡25
1951	‡33
1952	‡44
1953	‡57
1954	‡58
1955	‡61
1956	‡81
1957	‡113
1958	‡183
1959	‡248
1960	‡306
1961	‡441
1962	‡493
1963	‡598
1964	‡654
1965	‡619
1966	‡928

Year	Sales
1967	‡706
1968	‡729
1969	‡619
1970	‡928
1971	‡1,246
1972	‡1,844
1973	‡1,772
1974	‡1,436
1975	‡1,337
1976	‡1,426
1977	‡1,798
1978	‡1,939
1979	‡2,221
1980	‡2,470
1981	‡2,565
1982	‡2,209
1983	‡2,366
1984	‡2,856
1985	3,051
1986	3,663

Year	Sales
1987	3,942
1988	4,001
1989	3,821
1990	4,293
1991	4,487
1992	3,384
1993	2,345
1994	2,671
1995	3,144
1996	3,350
1997	3,581
1998	3,652
1999	3,775
2000	4,070
2001	4,289
2002	4,236
2003	4,238
2004	4,975
2005	5,409
2006	5,671

Year	Sales
2007	6,465
2008	6,587
2009	6,250
2010	6,461
2011	7,001
2012	7,318
2013	6,922
2014	†7,255
2015	†7,664
2016	†8,014
2017	†8,398
2018	†9,251
2019	†10,131
2020	†9,119
2021	11,115
2022	13,221
2023	13,663
2024	13,752

‡ Figure refers to units produced rather than to units sold.
† Figure refers to units shipped rather than to units sold.

Annual Ferrari sales to end customers (number of type-approved vehicles)

=== Recalls ===
In January 2020, the Italian carmaker said it will recall 982 vehicles for passenger airbags due to the Takata airbag recalls. If the inflator explodes, the airbag will spew metal shrapnel at passengers, which can cause severe injury. Every car involved will get a new passenger-side airbag assembly, complete with a new inflator without the dangerous propellant.

On 8 August 2022, the company recalled almost every car it's sold in the US since 2005 over a potential for brake failure. According to an NHTSA recall filing, 23,555 Ferrari models sold in America are fitted with a potentially faulty brake fluid reservoir cap that may not vent pressure adequately. The affected cars will be fitted with a replacement cap and receive a software update.

=== Stores and attractions ===
Roughly thirty Ferrari boutiques exist worldwide, with two owned by Ferrari and the rest operating as franchises. The stores sell branded clothes, accessories and racing memorabilia; some stores also feature racing simulators where visitors can drive virtual Ferrari vehicles. Clothing includes upscale and lower-priced collections for men, women, and children. Ferrari debuted its high fashion brand with its first runway in June 2021.

There are also two Ferrari-themed amusement parks:

- Ferrari World Abu Dhabi opened in 2010, is the first Ferrari-branded theme park in the world, and is situated on Yas Island in Abu Dhabi, in the United Arab Emirates. It has 37 rides and attractions and is home to the world's fastest roller coaster—Formula Rossa, and a dynamic coaster with one of the world's tallest loop—Flying Aces.
- Ferrari Land, opened since 2017, is the second such Ferrari-themed amusement park, and is located in PortAventura World resort, Catalonia Spain. It has 16 rides and attractions, and is home to Europe's fastest and highest vertical accelerator coaster—Red Force.

=== Company leadership ===
==== Chairmen ====
- Enzo Ferrari (1939–1988)
- Luca di Montezemolo (1991–2014)
- Sergio Marchionne (2014–2018)
- John Elkann (2018–present)

==== CEOs ====
- Enzo Ferrari (1939–1971)
- Jean Todt (2004–2008)
- Amedeo Felisa (2008–2016)
- Sergio Marchionne (2016–2018)
- Louis Camilleri (2018–2020)
- John Elkann (2020–2021)
- Benedetto Vigna (2021–present)

== See also ==
- Automotive industry in Italy
- List of automobile manufacturers of Italy
- List of companies of Italy
- List of Ferrari competition cars
- List of Ferrari engines
- List of Ferrari road cars
- Scuderia Ferrari

== General references ==
- Gustafson, Eric, "Cavallino Rampante", Sports Car International (Oct/Nov 2000): 94.
- Adler, Dennis, Ferrari: The Road from Maranello. Random House, 2006. ISBN 978-1-4000-6463-2.
