= Benedetto Vigna =

CEO from Ferrari

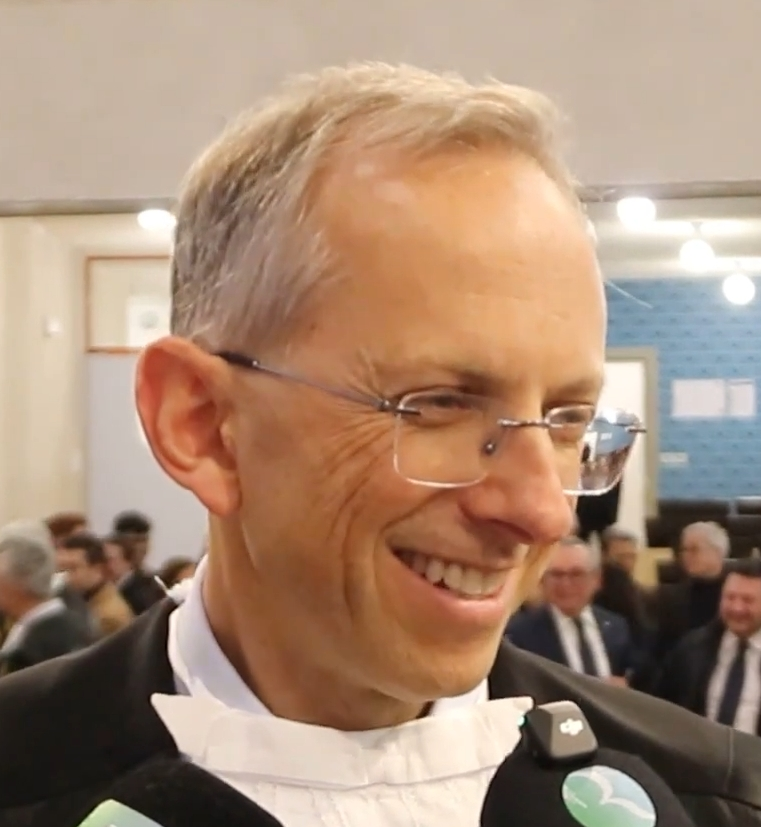
- Vigna in 2025
- Born: 10 April 1969 (age 57); Potenza, Italy
- Occupation: Business executive
- Title: CEO, Ferrari
- Board member of: Ferrari

Benedetto Vigna (born 10 April 1969) is an Italian physicist who is the chief executive officer of the automotive company Ferrari.

== Career ==
Born in Potenza, Basilicata, he grew up in the neighboring municipality of Pietrapertosa.

Graduating with honors as a physicist from the University of Pisa in 1993, he did his first experiences at the CERN in Geneva, the ESFR in Grenoble, and the Max Planck Institute in Munich. In 1995 he started working for STMicroelectronics starting the company's commitment to microelectromechanical systems (MEMS). He worked for a year at The Berkeley Sensor & Actuator Center (BSAC) at the University of California, Berkeley, before returning to ST and appointed director of the MEMS Business Unit.

Vigna's team developed the three-axis accelerometer, a three-dimensional motion sensor which was initially applied to the airbags of automobiles. After reducing its size and cost, the sensor was used in the Nintendo Wii console's wireless controller and iPhone's screen rotation feature. For this invention, Vigna was included in the shortlist of twelve candidates for the "European Inventor 2010" award promoted by European Patent Organization. In his career he has registered more than two hundred patents. In 2015, he received the IEEE Frederik Philips Award "for leadership in conceiving, developing, and commercializing micro-electromechanical systems (MEMS)".

On 9 June 2021, he was announced as the new chief executive officer of Ferrari.
