= Ferrari Millechili =

2007 concept car

The Ferrari Millechili (Italian for one thousand (mille) kilograms (chili)) is the name of a concept car shown at a technical symposium at Ferrari's headquarters in Maranello in 2007. It is also the name of a project by Ferrari to develop and manufacture a lightweight sports car. The development of the Millechili is being done in collaboration with University of Modena and Reggio Emilia, faculty of Mechanical Engineering. MilleChili Lab is a cross-project in which students are working on light-weight car design.

The Millechilli is 152.8 in (3.88 m) long, with a 104.3 in (2.65 m) wheelbase, resulting in an appearance of a scaled-down Enzo. The concept has an aluminum structure, a titanium transmission case, and several aerodynamic aids that reduce drag.

== Millechili Lab ==
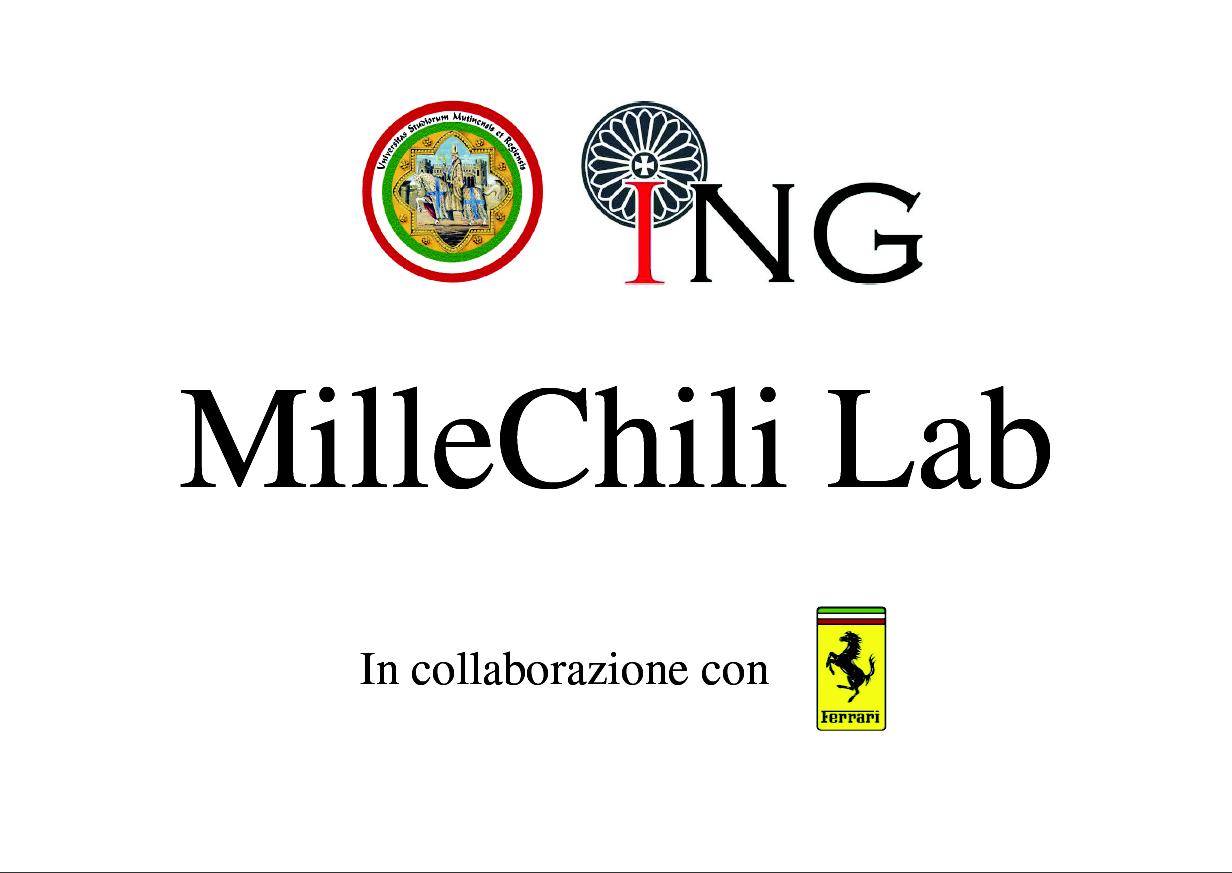
Millechili Lab nameplate

Millechili Lab is a part of the Millechili Project, created in February 2009 by the University of Modena's Engineering Faculty in collaboration with Ferrari.

The Millechili Lab is to study and design a light-weight automotive chassis for high-performance cars, thanks to the work of under-graduate and post-graduate students, all trained inside the Lab. There are only a few constrictions for the new designed lay-out: the possibility of industrialization and the respect of every performance target given by Ferrari. The future chassis, created for a mid-engine design car, should be designed in 3 years.

The Lab, thanks to Ferrari research funds, has four UNIX workstations supporting multiple users and also used as a 32CPUS' Cluster, and a brand-new cluster with 24CPUS. The Lab has also two Windows workstations. Every interactive computer is equipped with various pieces of software, such as CAE (CAD, FEA, Material Selector, etc...) programs, all the same used by Ferrari, to simplify information exchange.
