= Lorenzo Bandini Trophy =

Motorsport award

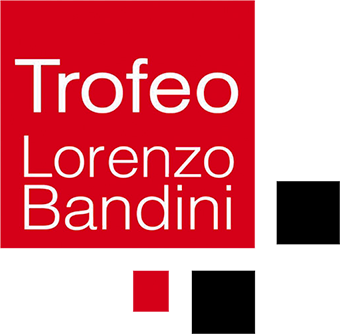
- The Lorenzo Bandini Trophy logo
- Awarded for: "a commendable performance in motorsport"
- Location: Brisighella, Emilia-Romagna
- Country: Italy
- Presented by: Associazione Trofeo Lorenzo Bandini
- First award: 1992
- Currently held by: Kimi Antonelli (2026)
- Website: https://www.trofeobandini.it/, http://www.trofeobandini.com/

The Lorenzo Bandini Trophy (Italian: Trofeo Lorenzo Bandini) is an annual award honouring an individual or team for their achievements in Formula One motor racing. The award, named after the Italian driver Lorenzo Bandini, who died three days after suffering severe burns in a major accident at the 1967 Monaco Grand Prix, was established by Francesco Asirelli and Tiziano Samorè of the Brisighella commune in 1992. The trophy, a ceramic replica of Bandini's Ferrari 312/67 car adorned with the number 18 created by the ceramist Goffredo Gaeta, is awarded for "a commendable performance in motorsport." This is not based on race results, but on how the success was achieved, as well as the recipient's character and approach to racing.

Each recipient is honoured for their achievements over the course of the previous year. The recipient is selected by a panel of 12 judges composed of motor racing journalists and former Formula One team members. Previously, the winner was decided by a vote from the residents of Brisighella. The winner is honoured at a ceremony in Bandini's home town of Brisighella in Emilia-Romagna by the Associazione Trofeo Lorenzo Bandini. (Note: The 2021 ceremony took place at the Ferrari museum in Maranello to comply with COVID-19 regulations, and has also been held in the city of Faenza.)

In the motor racing world, the accolade is considered highly prestigious. Ivan Capelli, an Italian driver, was the inaugural winner in 1992. No award was given in 1993 or 1994. Recipients are only allowed to win once, to give others the opportunity to win it. Although the accolade is usually awarded to racing drivers for their achievements from the previous season, it has been awarded to four racing team members: the Ferrari president Luca di Montezemolo (1997), the marque's vice-chairman Piero Ferrari (2013), the Formula One CEO Stefano Domenicali, and the Aprilia MotoGP CEO Massimo Rivola (2021). The latter two are the only joint recipients of the trophy in a calendar year.

The accolade has been given to two racing teams: the Mercedes AMG Petronas F1 Team for winning the World Constructors' Championship with a V6 engine coupled with hybrid technology (2015), and Scuderia Ferrari to commemorate the 70th anniversary of its establishment (2017). It has been presented to Italian individuals and teams ten times, German and British competitors and constructors four times apiece. The 2026 winner was the Mercedes Formula One driver Kimi Antonelli.

== Winners ==
Winners of the Lorenzo Bandini Trophy
Year	Image	Winner	Nationality	Category	Ref.
1992	A black and white photograph of Ivan Capelli in 1991	Ivan Capelli	Italian	Racing driver	
1993–1994	Not awarded				
1995 (for 1994)	A black and white photograph of David Coulthard in 1999	David Coulthard	British	Racing driver	
1996 (for 1995)	Jacques Villeneuve in 2002	Jacques Villeneuve	Canadian	Racing driver	
1997 (for 1996)	Luca Cordero di Montezemolo in 2008	Luca Cordero di Montezemolo	Italian	Company manager	
1998 (for 1997)	Giancarlo Fisichella wearing a red and white racing suit in 2012	Giancarlo Fisichella	Italian	Racing driver	
1999 (for 1998)	Alexander Wurz at the 2016 24 Hours of Le Mans	Alexander Wurz	Austrian	Racing driver	
2000 (for 1999)	Jarno Trulli in 2014	Jarno Trulli	Italian	Racing driver	
2001 (for 2000)	Jenson Button at the 2010 Malaysian Grand Prix	Jenson Button	British	Racing driver	
2002 (for 2001)	Juan Pablo Montoya at the 2002 United States Grand Prix	Juan Pablo Montoya	Colombian	Racing driver	
2003 (for 2002)	Michael Schumacher at the 2005 United States Grand Prix	Michael Schumacher	German	Racing driver	
2004 (for 2003)	Kimi Raikkonen at a Chinese temple in Taiwan in 2002	Kimi Räikkönen	Finnish	Racing driver	
2005 (for 2004)	Fernando Alonso at the 2016 Italian motorcycle Grand Prix	Fernando Alonso	Spanish	Racing driver	
2006 (for 2005)	Mark Webber at the 2008 Canadian Grand Prix	Mark Webber	Australian	Racing driver	
2007 (for 2006)	Felipe Massa at the 2007 Desafio Internacional das Estrelas kart race tournament	Felipe Massa	Brazilian	Racing driver	
2008 (for 2007)	Robert Kubica in BMW Sauber colours in 2007	Robert Kubica	Polish	Racing driver	
2009 (for 2008)	Sebastian Vettel waving to a group of spectators at the 2008 Canadian Grand Prix	Sebastian Vettel	German	Racing driver	
2010 (for 2009)	Lewis Hamilton talking at a press conference at the 2008 Singapore Grand Prix	Lewis Hamilton	British	Racing driver	
2011 (for 2010)	Nico Rosberg in a suit in 2015	Nico Rosberg	German	Racing driver	
2012 (for 2011)	Bruno Senna wearing a black T-shirt with sponsors logos and jeans at the 2011 Canadian Grand Prix	Bruno Senna	Brazilian	Racing driver	
2013 (for 2012)	Piero Ferrari speaking to the press in 2012	Piero Ferrari	Italian	Company manager	
2014 (for 2013)	Daniel Ricciardo at the 2015 Malaysian Grand Prix	Daniel Ricciardo	Australian	Racing driver	
2015 (for 2014)	Lewis Hamilton driving a silver Mercedes Formula One car at the 2014 Singapore Grand Prix	Mercedes AMG Petronas F1 Team	German	Motor racing team	
2016 (for 2015)	Max Verstappen at the 2016 Malaysian Grand Prix	Max Verstappen	Dutch	Racing driver	
2017 (for 2016)	Sebastian Vettel driving a Ferrari Formula One at the Circuit de Barcelona-Catalunya in early 2017	Scuderia Ferrari	Italian	Motor racing team	
2018 (for 2017)	Valtteri Bottas at the 2017 United States Grand Prix	Valtteri Bottas	Finnish	Racing driver	
2019 (for 2018)	Antonio Giovinazzi at the 2019 pre-season test session at the Circuit de Barcelona-Catalunya	Antonio Giovinazzi	Italian	Racing driver	
2020 (for 2019)	Charles Leclerc wearing a scarlet red Ferrari T-shirt and sporting black sunglasses	Charles Leclerc	Monegasque	Racing driver	
2021	Stefano Domenicali in 2020	Stefano Domenicali	Italian	Business executives	
2021	Massimo Rivola at a signing in 2013	Massimo Rivola	Italian	Business executives	
2022	Kevin Magnussen wearing a black Haas jacket	Kevin Magnussen	Danish	Racing driver	
2023		Lando Norris	British	Racing driver	
2024	George Russell sporting a silver Baseball cap, a black jacket and is holding a green microphone in his right hand	George Russell	British	Racing driver	
2025		Oscar Piastri	Australian	Racing driver	
2026		Kimi Antonelli	Italian	Racing driver	

== Statistics ==
Winners by nationality
Nationality	Winners
Italian	10
British	5
German	4
Australian	3
Brazilian	2
Finnish	2
Austrian	1
Canadian	1
Colombian	1
Monegasque	1
Dutch	1
Polish	1
Spanish	1
Danish	1

== See also ==
- Hawthorn Memorial Trophy
