= Laurent Mekies =

French motorsport executive (born 1977)

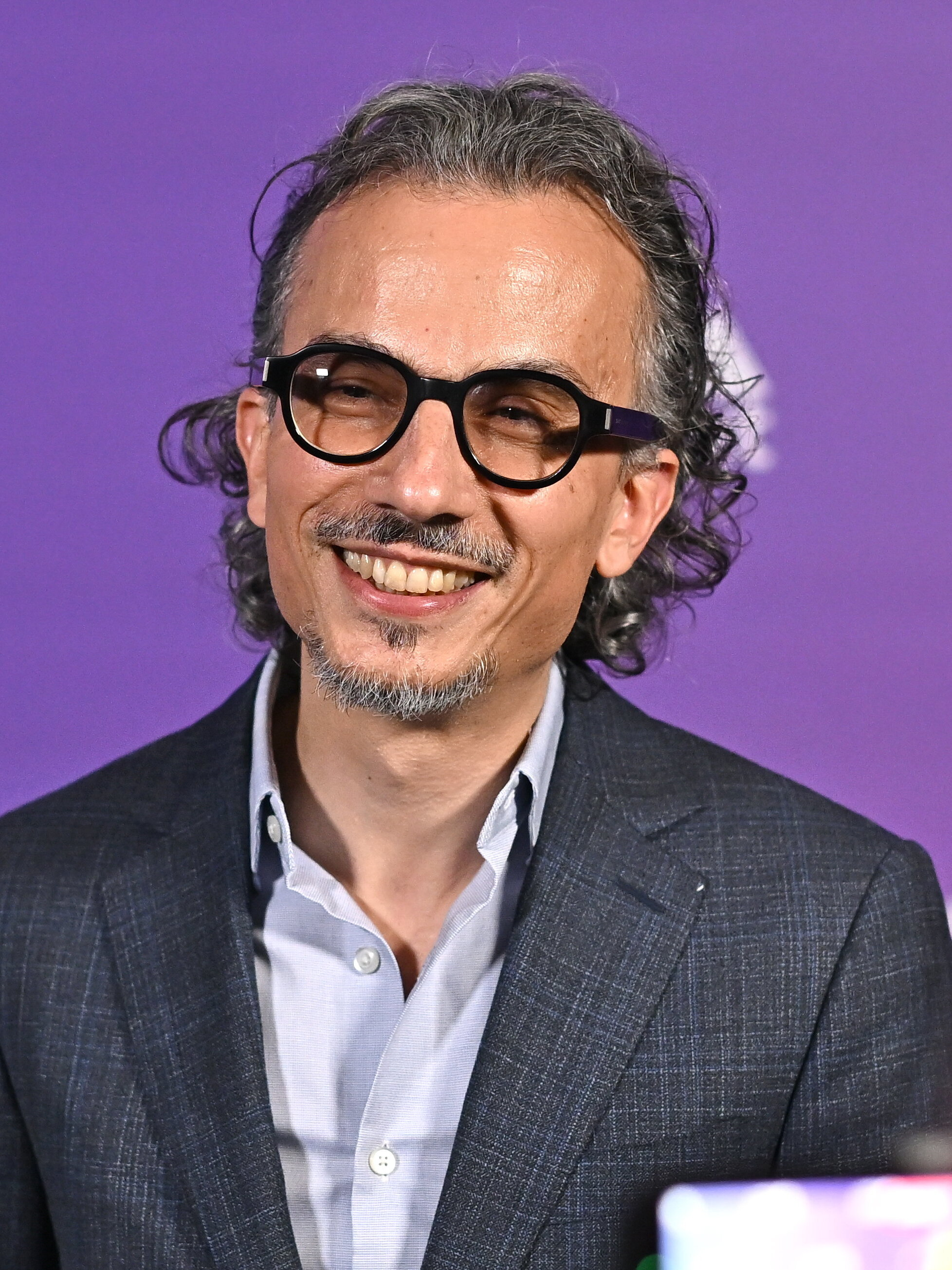
- Mekies in 2025
- Born: Laurent Philippe Mekies; 28 April 1977 (age 49); Tours, Centre-Val de Loire, France
- Education: ESTACA; Loughborough University
- Occupations: Motorsport executive; motorsport administrator; engineer
- Employers: Formula Three; Signature team (1999-2000); Formula One; Asiatech (2000–2002); with Arrows (2001); with Minardi (2002); Minardi (2003–2005); Toro Rosso (2006–2014); FIA (2014–2018); Ferrari (2018–2023); Racing Bulls (2024–2025); Red Bull (2025–present)
- Title: Team Principal; Chief Executive Officer

Laurent Philippe Mekies (born 28 April 1977) is a French Formula One engineer and team principal who has held senior technical and management roles across multiple teams. He began his career in junior single-seater categories before joining Asiatech and subsequently Minardi, where he worked as a race engineer. After serving as chief engineer and head of vehicle performance at Toro Rosso, he joined the FIA as Safety Director and later became Deputy Formula One Race Director. Mekies moved to Ferrari in 2018 as Sporting Director, later becoming Racing Director until his departure in 2023. He subsequently joined the Red Bull organisation, leading the Visa Cash App RB Formula One Team in 2024 before being appointed Chief Executive Officer and Team Principal of Red Bull Racing in July 2025.

== Career ==
=== Education and junior formulae ===
Mekies graduated from Loughborough University after earning a master’s degree of mechanical engineering at the École supérieure des techniques aéronautiques et de construction automobile (ESTACA) in Paris. While still studying at ESTACA, he worked as an intern in French Formula 3 with Philippe Sinault’s Signature team (1999). He continued there in 2000, contributing to the success of Jonathan Cochet, who won both the French Formula 3 Championship and the Masters of Formula 3 at Zandvoort.

Later in 2000, Mekies joined the newly established company Asiatech, which had taken over Peugeot’s Formula One engine programme. He worked as an engine engineer, contributing to the development of the ten-cylinder V10 Asiatech/AMT power unit used by the Arrows team for the 2001 season. That same year, he took part in testing at the Valencia circuit, where Jos Verstappen and Pedro de la Rosa tested the Asiatech engine in the Arrows AMT A21 chassis.

=== First spell in Formula One (2001–2014) ===
After moving into Formula One, Mekies continued with Asiatech, which supplied engines to the Arrows team in 2001. During that season, he served as an engine race engineer for Enrique Bernoldi. The following year, when Asiatech supplied engines to Minardi, he held the same position for Mark Webber.

When Asiatech announced its closure in 2002, Mekies stayed on with Minardi as a permanent employee. He continued as an engine race engineer in 2003 (working with Justin Wilson) and was later promoted to race engineer, partnering Zsolt Baumgartner in 2004 and Christijan Albers in 2005.

Following Minardi’s takeover and rebranding as Toro Rosso, Mekies remained with the team. From 2006 to 2012, he served as chief engineer (race and test team), and between 2013 and 2014, he held the position of head of vehicle performance.

=== FIA (2014–2018) ===
In October 2014, Mekies joined the FIA as Safety Director, responsible for safety and medical matters across all FIA championships. His duties also included research, development, and homologation of safety components. In this role, he oversaw the development of safety solutions, homologation processes, medical protocols, circuit design, and cooperation with promoters and event organisers. Within the FIA’s safety department, he was involved in the introduction of the halo system, including its presentation and advocacy within the sport. At the beginning of 2017, he was appointed Deputy Formula One Race Director, assisting Charlie Whiting in managing race weekends and the sporting agenda.

=== Return to Formula One (2018–present) ===
In November 2018, Mekies was confirmed as Sporting Director of Ferrari, a position that had remained vacant since Massimo Rivola’s departure at the end of 2015. He made his first appearance with Ferrari at the 2018 season finale in Abu Dhabi. In 2019, he expanded his responsibilities to lead the Track & Performance department. From 2021, he served as Racing Director, overseeing operations during race weekends, driver strategy, and car performance.

In July 2023, Ferrari announced his departure from the team, with Diego Ioverno taking over his sporting duties. In December 2023, it was confirmed that, following a period of gardening leave, Mekies would assume leadership of the AlphaTauri team (formerly Toro Rosso).

At the start of the 2024 season, Mekies took over as Team Principal of the Visa Cash App RB Formula One Team (formerly Scuderia AlphaTauri), working alongside Chief Executive Officer Peter Bayer on restructuring and redefining the team’s direction as part of Red Bull’s broader Formula One reorganisation.

On 9 July 2025, Mekies was appointed Chief Executive Officer and Team Principal of Red Bull Racing after Christian Horner was dismissed from his position. Mekies thus became the first person since 2005 to take charge of Red Bull’s main Formula One team. His first race in charge was the 2025 Belgian Grand Prix at Spa.
