= Diego Ioverno =

Italian engineer

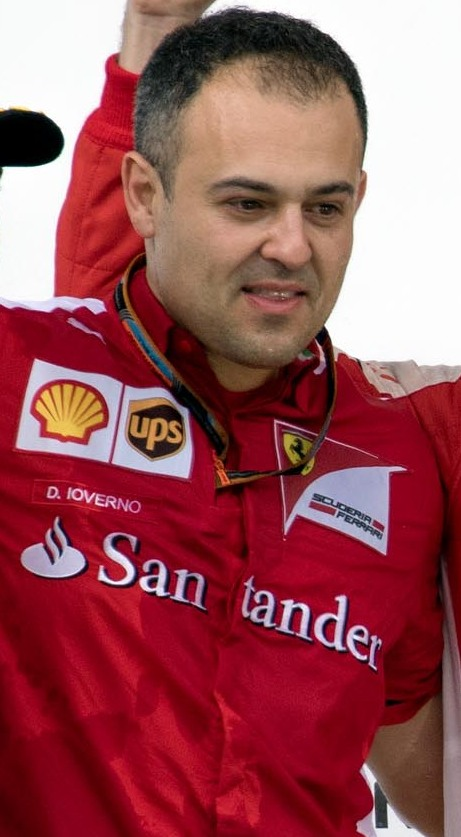
- Born: 31 May 1974 (age 51)
- Occupation: Engineer
- Employer: Scuderia Ferrari
- Known for: Formula One engineer
- Title: Sporting director

Diego Ioverno (born 31 May 1974) is an Italian Formula One engineer. He is the sporting director at the Scuderia Ferrari Formula One team.

== Career ==
Ioverno started his career in motorsport as a gearbox assembly technician for Scuderia Ferrari, leading the gearbox assembly department during the dominant period for the prancing horse in the early noughties. He became head of car assembly in 2008, where he was in charge of car build during all F1 tests and sessions. Ioverno was given the additional role of head of race operations in 2010, where he also lead the teams garage operations and liaising with mechanics and technicians and being responsible for pit stops. After the departure of Massimo Rivola at the end of 2015 Ioverno became sporting manager coupling his previous role with representing the Scuderia in discussions with the FIA and the Sporting Working Group. He moved to a factory based job in 2018 but got the call to return to the trackside for 2021 as chief engineer, vehicle operations.

On 27 July 2023, due to Laurent Mekies leaving the Scuderia to join AlphaTauri as team principal, Ioverno was announced as Ferrari's sporting director from the 2023 Belgian Grand Prix onwards.
