= Ferrari (2023 film) =

American film by Michael Mann

- Theatrical release poster
- Directed by: Michael Mann
- Written by: Troy Kennedy Martin
- Based on: Enzo Ferrari: The Man, the Cars, the Races, the Machine by Brock Yates
- Produced by: Michael Mann; P.J. van Sandwijk; Marie Savare; John Lesher; Thomas Hayslip; John Friedberg; Andrea Iervolino; Monika Bacardi; Gareth West; Lars Sylvest; Thorsten Schumacher; Laura Rister
- Starring: Adam Driver; Penélope Cruz; Shailene Woodley; Sarah Gadon; Gabriel Leone; Jack O'Connell; Patrick Dempsey
- Cinematography: Erik Messerschmidt
- Edited by: Pietro Scalia
- Music by: Daniel Pemberton
- Production companies: Moto Pictures; Forward Pass; Storyteller Productions; STXfilms; Ketchup Entertainment; Esme Grace Media; Rocket Science; Cecchi Gori USA; Iervolino & Lady Bacardi Entertainment; Bliss Media; Le Grisbi Productions; Red Sea Film Fund
- Distributed by: Neon
- Release dates: August 31, 2023 (Venice); December 25, 2023 (United States)
- Running time: 130 minutes
- Country: United States
- Language: English
- Budget: $95 million
- Box office: $43.6 million

Ferrari is a 2023 American biographical sports drama film directed by Michael Mann and written by Troy Kennedy Martin. Based on the 1991 biography Enzo Ferrari: The Man, the Cars, the Races, the Machine by motorsport journalist Brock Yates, the film follows the personal and professional struggles of Enzo Ferrari, the Italian founder of the car manufacturer Ferrari, during the summer of 1957 as Scuderia Ferrari prepares to compete in the 1957 Mille Miglia. Adam Driver portrays the titular subject, and Penélope Cruz, Shailene Woodley, Sarah Gadon, Gabriel Leone, Jack O'Connell, and Patrick Dempsey co-star.

Ferrari was selected to compete for the Golden Lion at the 80th Venice International Film Festival, premiering on August 31, 2023. The film was originally set to premiere on the streaming service Showtime, but it was eventually released in the United States theatrically on December 25, 2023, by Neon. The film received generally positive reviews from critics and was named one of the top 10 films of 2023 by the National Board of Review. The film underperformed at the box office, grossing only $43 million worldwide against a $95 million budget.

== Plot ==
In the summer of 1957, Italian automotive entrepreneur Enzo Ferrari prepares his racing team for the Mille Miglia, an open-road, endurance-based race lasting 1,000 miles. Grappling with both domestic and professional crises, Enzo and his estranged wife, Laura, grieve for their only son, Dino, who died a year prior. While he has kept Laura from learning of his infidelities, Enzo's mistress, Lina Lardi, pressures him to grant their illegitimate son, Piero, the Ferrari name as his confirmation nears.

Meanwhile, Ferrari's manufacturing company is in terrible financial shape after the groundbreaking development of the team's Formula One car. It needs to make a deal quickly with one of its competitors to survive. However, Laura owns half of the company's shares, and Enzo needs full control to seal a deal.

In exchange for power of attorney over her shares, a resentful Laura demands a check for US$500,000, which will bankrupt the company if she cashes it. She confirms her suspicions that Enzo has been having an affair after discovering that Lina and Piero live in the countryside outside Modena. He agrees to write the check and trusts Laura to wait to cash it.

As the Mille Miglia commences in Brescia, Enzo encourages his drivers to remain ahead of the competing drivers. During a pit stop in Rome, Enzo's newest addition to the team, Alfonso de Portago, refuses to change tires to stay in the lead.

At Guidizzolo, de Portago's car's worn left front tire is sliced open by a damaged cat's eye. The ensuing blowout causes the car to flip over and fly out of control, killing de Portago, his navigator, and nine onlookers, including children.

Another of Ferrari's drivers, the veteran Piero Taruffi, completes the round trip to Brescia and wins the race. The news media blames Enzo for de Portago's lethal accident. Laura cashes her check and pushes the company to the brink of insolvency, but gives Enzo the cash to use as bribe money for journalists to salvage his reputation.

Laura also gives Enzo her signed power of attorney, thereby giving him the chance to save his company, but requests that in return, he refrain from giving Piero the Ferrari name until after her death. Enzo agrees and later brings Piero to his half-brother's grave.

== Cast ==
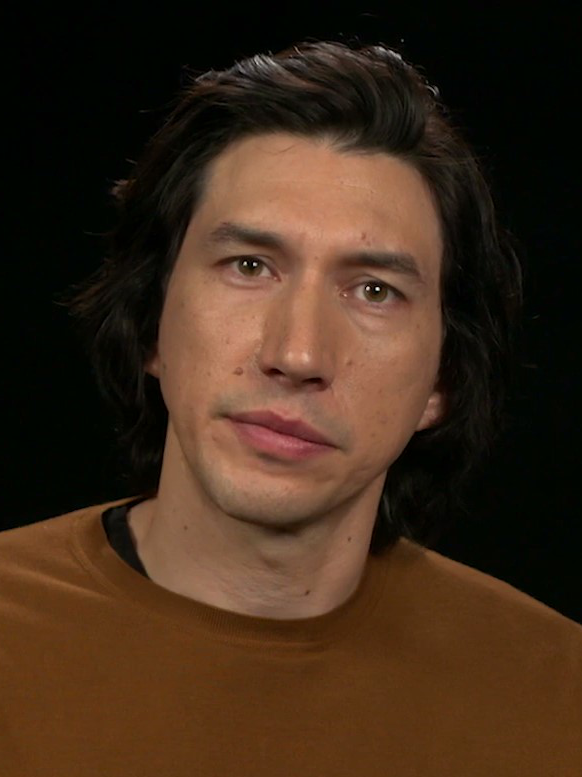
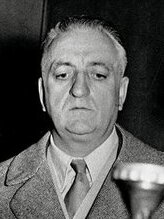
Adam Driver (left) plays Enzo Ferrari (right; pictured in the 1950s, when the film is set).
- Adam Driver as Enzo Ferrari
- Penélope Cruz as Laura Ferrari
- Shailene Woodley as Lina Lardi
- Sarah Gadon as Linda Christian
- Gabriel Leone as Alfonso de Portago
- Jack O'Connell as Peter Collins
- Patrick Dempsey as Piero Taruffi
- Michele Savoia as Carlo Chiti
- Lino Musella as Sergio Scaglietti
- Domenico Fortunato as Adolfo Orsi
- Jacopo Bruno as Omer Orsi
- Erik Haugen as Edmund "Gunner" Nelson
- Ben Collins as Stirling Moss
- Wyatt Carnell as Wolfgang von Trips
- Andrea Dolente as Gino Rancati
- Giuseppe Bonifati as Giacomo Cuoghi
- Daniela Piperno as Adalgisa Ferrari
- Tommaso Basili as Gianni Agnelli
- Benedetto Benedettini as Alfredo "Dino" Ferrari
  - Gabriel Noto as Dino Ferrari (seven years old)
  - Edoardo Beraldi as Dino Ferrari (three years old)
- Giuseppe Festinese as Piero Lardi
- Marino Franchitti as Eugenio Castellotti
- Valentina Bellè as Cecilia Manzini
- Jonathan Burteaux as King Hussein of Jordan
- Marc Gené as mechanic parking in rain

== Production ==
=== Development ===
Michael Mann first began exploring making the film around 2000, having discussed the project with Sydney Pollack. Mann had been developing the script with writer Troy Kennedy Martin, who died in 2009. (Note: A journalist interviewing Kennedy Martin in his office in 1997 noted, "Behind his desk, eight red foolscap document boxes hold different versions of a screenplay for a film about the legendary Italian car-maker Enzo Ferrari, to be made by Michael Mann, director of Heat. It is currently waiting while Disney, which will produce, tries to tempt a De Niro or a Pacino to take on the title role. It may be a long wait.") Mann was offered $40 million to make the film, but he refused because he thought that the budget was not enough.

In August 2015, Christian Bale entered negotiations to star as Ferrari. Filming was planned to begin in summer 2016 in Italy. In October 2015, Paramount Pictures bought the worldwide distribution rights for the film. Bale exited the film in January 2016 over concerns of meeting the weight requirements for the role before the start of production. The project stalled until April 2017, when Hugh Jackman entered negotiations to portray Ferrari, and Noomi Rapace as his wife with Paramount no longer involved. The project would again go dormant until June 2020. Mann and Jackman were still attached but Rapace was no longer involved, with STX Entertainment handling international distribution.

By February 2022 Jackman had left the film, with Adam Driver now starring as Ferrari. Penélope Cruz and Shailene Woodley also joined the cast. Driver was cast due to his performances in Logan Lucky and Marriage Story. Mann, Driver and Cruz reduced their salaries for the film.

STX Entertainment agreed to finance 70% of the budget and also acquire the North American distribution rights. The rest of the financing came from the Italian tax credit and private investors. In July, Gabriel Leone, Sarah Gadon, Jack O'Connell and Patrick Dempsey were added to the cast. Pre-production began in April 2022, with filming originally set to commence in July in Modena.

=== Filming ===
Principal photography began on August 17, 2022, in Modena. Filming occurred also in Brescia in early October. Production of the film wrapped in late October 2022, with the final shots filmed in the city of Imola and at the Imola Circuit.

The worn cat's eye which the film depicts as causing de Portago's fatal crash was not added in post-production. It was an actual physical prop made out of a rubber-like thermoplastic through a 3D printing process by CRP Technologies. Other props like the archaic racing helmets were also created through the same process.

=== Music ===
The film's score is composed by Daniel Pemberton. Milan Records released the soundtrack on December 25, 2023.

== Release ==
Ferrari had its world premiere at the 80th Venice International Film Festival on August 31, 2023. Initially set for a U.S. theatrical release, the film's main financier STX Entertainment planned to premiere Ferrari on Showtime and Paramount+ in the United States instead of theatrically releasing it through their deal with Lionsgate, but eventually decided to license the United States distribution rights to another theatrical distributor. Only Neon agreed to release the film in the United States theatrically, and Neon paid $15 million to acquire the United States distribution rights. Neon spent $17 million on marketing, expecting the film to make $17.5 million in North America.

Sky Cinema and Black Bear Pictures released the film in the United Kingdom theatrically on December 26, 2023. STX retained other international rights.

=== Home media ===
Ferrari was released on digital platforms in the United States on January 23, 2024, and on Blu-ray and DVD on March 12, 2024. The film was released in France through Amazon Prime Video.

== Reception ==
=== Box office ===
Ferrari grossed $18.6 million in the United States and Canada, and $25.1 million in other territories, for a worldwide total of $43.6 million.

In the United States and Canada, Ferrari was released alongside The Boys in the Boat and The Color Purple, and was projected to gross around $1 million from 2,330 theaters on its first day. It ended up slightly exceeding expectations, grossing $2.9 million and finishing in 14th. The following weekend the film made $4.1 million, finishing in ninth at the box office and totaling $10.9 million over its first week of release. In the film's second weekend it made $2.5 million, remaining in ninth. Neon stated the film exceeded their expectations of $17.5 million gross at the domestic box office, and labeled the film a success.

=== Critical response ===
On the review aggregator website Rotten Tomatoes, 73% of 261 critics' reviews are positive, with an average rating of 6.6/10. The website's consensus reads: "Sleek and well-acted, Ferrari overcomes its occasionally underpowered narrative to deliver a rousing and admirably complex biopic." Metacritic, which uses a weighted average, assigned the film a score of 73 out of 100, based on 55 critics, indicating "generally favorable" reviews. Audiences polled by CinemaScore gave the film an average grade of "B" on an A+ to F scale, while PostTrak reported 74% filmgoers gave it a positive score.

Marlow Stern of Rolling Stone praised Penélope Cruz's performance, writing: "There is an unstoppable force at the center of Michael Mann's Ferrari. It is fast, fierce, and wildly unpredictable. One moment it has you in the throes of ecstasy; the next, fearing for your life. And when you see it coming around the bend, it's curtains. Don't even bother putting up a fight. You'll lose. I'm talking, of course, about Penélope Cruz."

Damon Wise of Deadline Hollywood was more critical of Adam Driver's performance, stating: "Given what's at stake [in the film], a strangely unemotional lead performance from Adam Driver makes it hard to warm to this odd and deeply self-absorbed character. Add in the glacial pace of its narrative, and a film expected to take an early awards-season lead will struggle to hold that pole position."

Italian actor Pierfrancesco Favino criticized the film for casting American actors to portray Italian characters, instead of Italian actors. The Italian newspaper La Stampa found that it was a beautiful film but regretted that it covered only a limited part of Ferrari's life, while Piero Ferrari claimed various elements in the film did not accurately reflect the facts.

Among mixed reviews, Kevin Nguyen of The Verge, wrote that he wanted "to credit Ferrari for being a weirder movie than you might expect for a biopic about a guy who builds iconic sports cars. But every swerve feels imprecise, and each detour just takes the film further in an unclear direction."

== Accolades ==
| Award | Date of Ceremony | Category | Recipient(s) | Result | Ref(s) |
|---|---|---|---|---|---|
| Venice International Film Festival | September 9, 2023 | Golden Lion | Michael Mann | Nominated | |
| Gotham Independent Film Awards | 27 November 2023 | Outstanding Supporting Performance | Penélope Cruz | Nominated | |
| Gotham Independent Film Awards | 27 November 2023 | Icon and Creator Tribute for Innovation | Ferrari | Won | |
| Camerimage | November 18, 2023 | Golden Frog | Erik Messerschmidt | Nominated | |
| Camerimage | November 18, 2023 | Special EnergaCamerimage Award for an Actor | Adam Driver | Won | |
| National Board of Review | 6 December 2023 | Top Ten Films | Ferrari | Won | |
| Georgia Film Critics Association | January 5, 2024 | Best Supporting Actress | Penélope Cruz | Nominated | |
| Seattle Film Critics Society | January 8, 2024 | Best Supporting Actress | Penélope Cruz | Nominated | |
| AARP Movies for Grownups Awards | January 17, 2024 | Best Director | Michael Mann | Nominated | |
| AARP Movies for Grownups Awards | January 17, 2024 | Best Time Capsule | Ferrari | Nominated | |
| Minnesota Film Critics Alliance | February 4, 2024 | Best Sound Work | Ferrari | Nominated | |
| AACTA International Awards | February 10, 2024 | Best Supporting Actress | Penélope Cruz | Nominated | |
| Society of Composers & Lyricists | February 13, 2024 | Outstanding Original Score for an Independent Film | Daniel Pemberton | Nominated | |
| Satellite Awards | February 17, 2024 | Best Actress in a Motion Picture – Drama | Penélope Cruz | Nominated | |
| Satellite Awards | February 17, 2024 | Best Motion Picture – Drama | Ferrari | Nominated | |
| Satellite Awards | February 17, 2024 | Best Cinematography | Erik Messerschmidt | Nominated | |
| Satellite Awards | February 17, 2024 | Best Sound | Ferrari | Nominated | |
| Satellite Awards | February 17, 2024 | Best Production Design | Maria Djurkovic, Sophie Phillips | Nominated | |
| British Academy Film Awards | February 18, 2024 | Best Sound | Angelo Bonanni, Tony Lamberti, Andy Nelson, Lee Orloff, Bernard Weiser | Nominated | |
| Screen Actors Guild Awards | February 24, 2024 | Outstanding Performance by a Female Actor in a Supporting Role | Penélope Cruz | Nominated | |
| Astra Film and Creative Awards | February 26, 2024 | Best Sound | Ferrari | Nominated | |
| Cinema Audio Society Awards | 2 March 2024 | Outstanding Achievement in Sound Mixing for Motion Picture – Live Action | Lee Orloff, Andy Nelson, Tony Lamberti, Luke Schwarzweller, Andrew Dudman, Matthew Wood, Giorgi Lekishvili | Nominated | |
| Golden Reel Awards | 3 March 2024 | Outstanding Achievement in Sound Editing – Feature Effects / Foley | Tony Lamberti, Bernard Weiser, David Wentz, Brent Findley, Steven Ticknor, Benjamin Cook, Beso Kacharava, Biko Gogaladze, Alexander Sanikidze, Rati Chkhetiani | Nominated | |
