= Ferrari (2003 film) =

- Written by: Massimo De Rita; Carlo Carlei; Mario Falcone
- Directed by: Carlo Carlei
- Starring: Sergio Castellitto; Ed Stoppard; Jessica Brooks
- Music by: Paolo Buonvino
- Country of origin: Italy
- Original language: English

Production
- Producers: Guido De Angelis; Franz Landerer
- Cinematography: Gino Sgreva
- Editors: Claudio Di Mauro; Luciana Pandolfelli
- Running time: 215 minutes
- Production company: DeAngelis Group

Original release
- Release: 16 February 2003

Ferrari is a 2003 Italian biopic based on the book by Enzo Biagi. It depicts Enzo Ferrari's rise from a successful race driver to one of the most famous entrepreneurs of all time. Being interviewed by a fictitious, intrusive young journalist he recalls his setbacks and personal losses. He also expresses his regrets about race drivers who met with an accident. The film finishes with a dedication by Piero Ferrari: "In loving memory of my father and of my brother Dino." Due to its success the original TV miniseries was edited for cinema.

== Plot ==
When he is only ten years old, Enzo Ferrari runs to the next village only to watch a car race. Now the direction for his life is set. He starts immediately working on vehicles and as soon as he is old enough to drive a real car, he becomes a race car driver.

Soon the young man shows ambitions in finding a racing team. He offers his services to Fiat but the team managers turn him down. Yet Alfa Romeo hires Ferrari and promotes him to team manager.

With gusto Ferrari takes his family to the races. His wife objects to the noise and considers this environment inappropriate for little Dino, but Enzo's enthusiasm knows no restraint. He is determined to raise him as his successor.

Ferrari's reputation grows and enables him to create his own company, Scuderia Ferrari. When he presents his employees (including Giuseppe Campari and Tazio Nuvolari) to the press, he explains that enthusiasm can be contagious. But when German troops come to Italy, Ferrari is accused of building weapons for the Italian resistance. Although one of the officers is a former racing driver and a fan of Ferrari and tries to protect him, Ferrari must hide.

After the war Enzo Ferrari rebuilds his destroyed factory, and begins pushing himself to his limits. Once he is back in business and has recovered from exhaustion, he finds out that Dino suffers with an especially severe form of muscular dystrophy. Enzo regrets not having spent more time with him, a thought which will haunt him for the rest of his life.

== Cast ==
- Sergio Castellitto as Enzo Ferrari

- Elio Germano as Enzo Ferrari at 18 years old
- Skandar Keynes as Enzo Ferrari at 8 years old

- Ed Stoppard as Ferrari's alter ego
- Cristina Moglia as Laura Garello
- Jessica Brooks as Lina Lardi
- Mathew Bose as Dino
- Pierfrancesco Favino as Filippo
- Jonathan Bailey as Alfredo Ferrari
- Vincent Schiavelli as Mr. Paradise
- Francesca De Sapio as Adalgisa Ferrari
- Gabriella Pession as Floriana Ferrari
- Anton Alexander as Lawyer to Enzo Ferrari as Tazio Nuvolari
- Matteo Angius as Gilles Villeneuve
- Vincent Riotta as Journalist
- Sal Borgese as Beppe Sicci
- Andy Luotto as Mr. Garello
