= Alfredo Ferrari =

Italian engineer and son of Enzo Ferrari

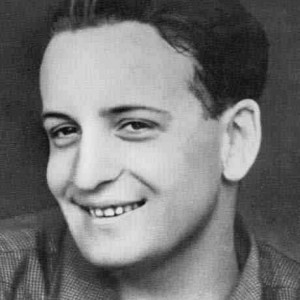
- Ferrari before 1956
- Born: Alfredo Ferrari; 19 January 1932; Modena, Kingdom of Italy
- Died: 30 June 1956 (aged 24); Modena, Italy
- Parents: Enzo Ferrari (father); Laura Dominica Garello (mother)
- Relatives: Piero Ferrari (half-brother)

Alfredo Ferrari (nicknamed Alfredino or Dino; 19 January 1932 – 30 June 1956) was an Italian automotive engineer and the first son of automaker Enzo Ferrari. He was diagnosed with Duchenne muscular dystrophy, and died aged 24. After his death, Ferrari named the car fitted with the engine that Alfredo was working on at the time of his death "Dino" in his honour.

== Early life ==
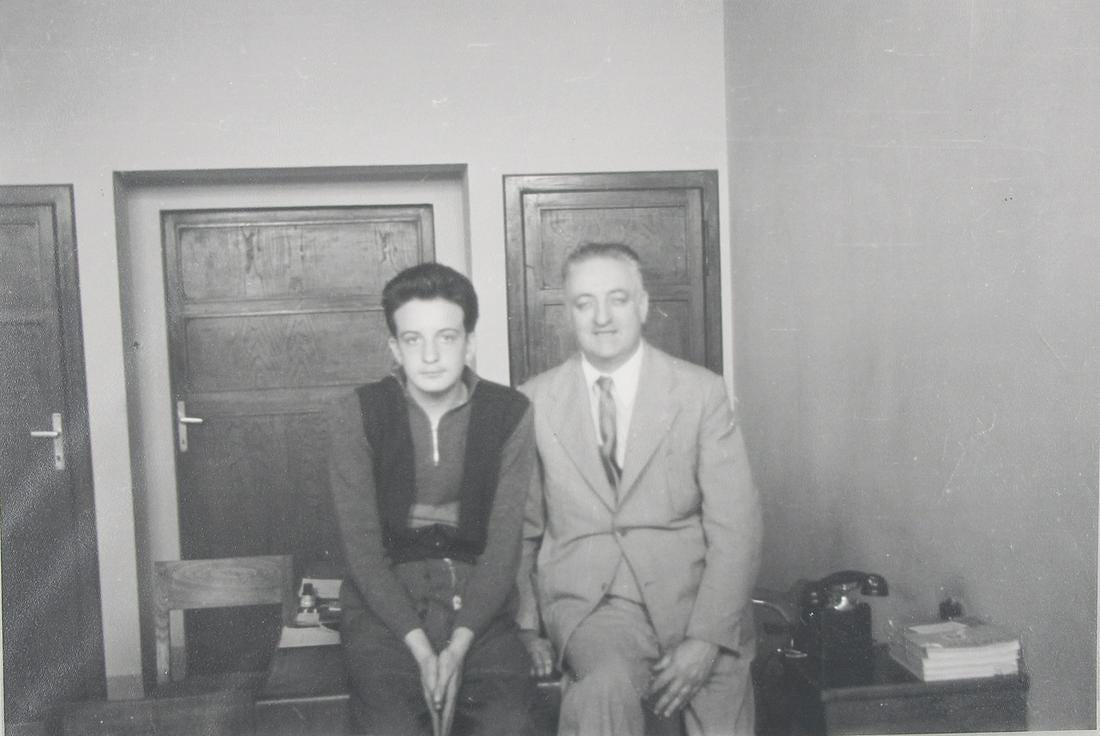
Dino Ferrari, aged 15, and his father, Enzo Ferrari, photographed in 1947

Born to Enzo Ferrari and his wife Laura Dominica Garello on 19 January 1932, Alfredo was named after his paternal grandfather and uncle, who died in a flu outbreak in 1916.

Enzo, who at the time was a racing driver for Alfa Romeo, had vowed to stop racing cars if he had a son. He kept his promise and retired from driving in 1932, concentrating on racing team management with the newly-formed Scuderia Ferrari.

From an early age, Enzo groomed Alfredino, "little Alfredo", to be his successor. Alfredo studied economics in Bologna before moving to mechanical engineering in Switzerland.

== Career at Ferrari ==
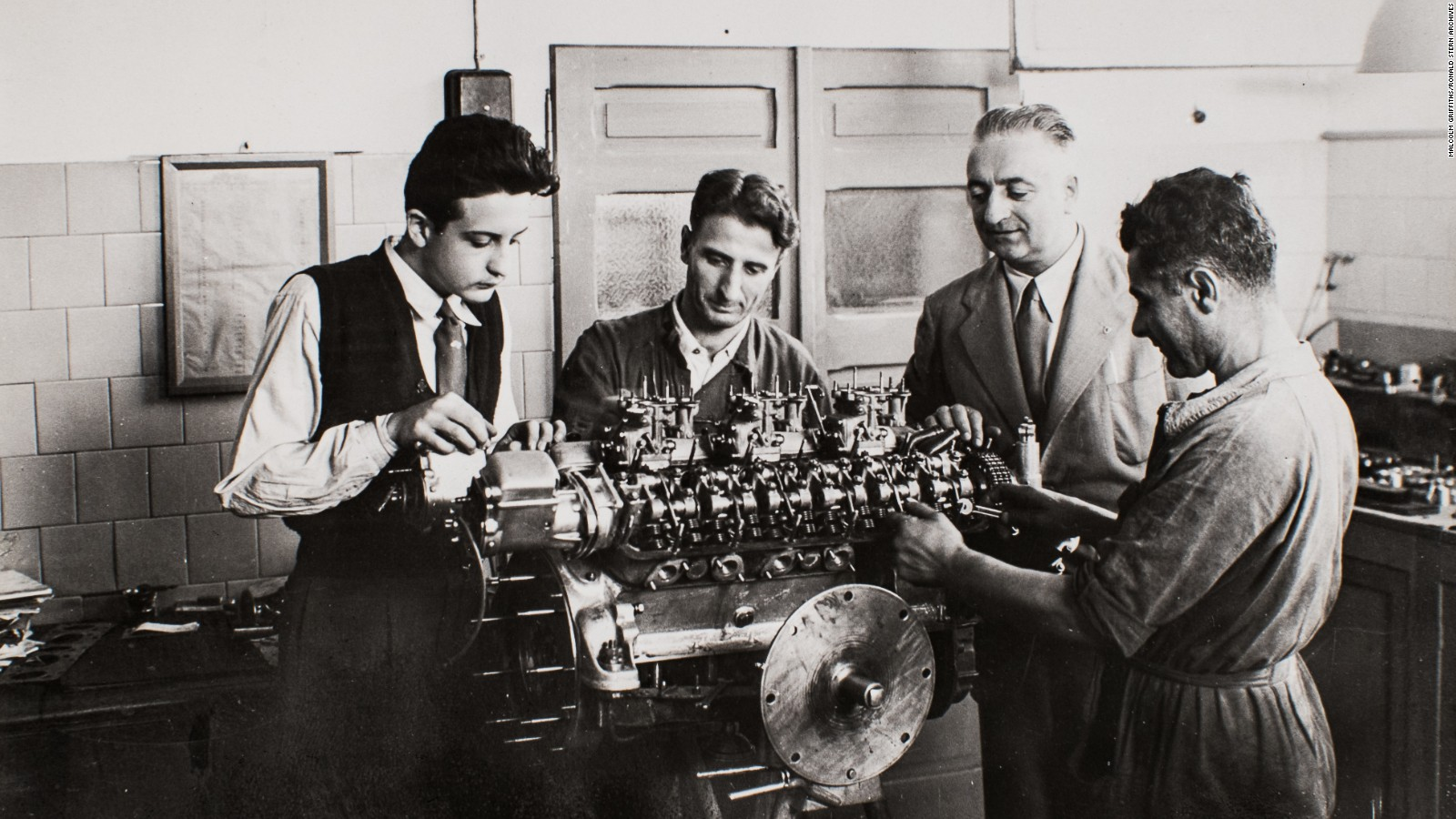
Dino Ferrari with father Enzo Ferrari at Scuderia Ferrari, date unknown; believed to be from around 1955–1956 or before.

In his short career at Ferrari, Alfredo was widely credited for the 750 Monza racing car; and, to a limited extent, a 1.5-litre V6, the Ferrari Dino engine, that would later see action in Ferrari's early Formula Two racers. Alfredo suggested to his father the development of a 1.5-litre DOHC V6 engine for F2 at the end of 1955. Two years later, in 1957, to honour his son, Enzo named the Dino series of racing sports cars using this V6 engine after him. Road cars under the same marque soon followed.

Gino Rancati, a friend of Enzo Ferrari, noted: "Dino, though he suffered because of his health, had always played an active part in the Ferrari company. He was interested in everything, but it was perhaps engines that interested him the most."

== Death ==
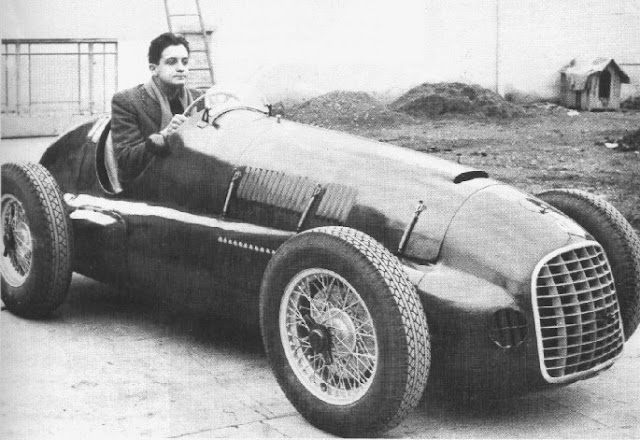
Dino driving a Ferrari 125 GPC. Date unknown, thought to be around 1955–1956.

During his time at Ferrari, Alfredo started experiencing health problems. His physical movements gradually became stiff, and he was often unable to maintain his balance. At his return to Modena, he was diagnosed with Duchenne muscular dystrophy. In the final days of his life, while hospitalized, he discussed technical details of the 1.5-litre V6 with fellow engineer Vittorio Jano and his father, Enzo Ferrari; Enzo remarked on Dino's "intensity, intelligence, and attentiveness". Alfredo would never see the engine; he died in Modena on 30 June 1956, aged 24.

Enzo Ferrari later said of caring for Dino in the final months leading up to his death:

"I had deluded myself – as fathers often do – that our attentions would help [Dino] to regain his health. I had convinced myself that [Dino] was like one of my cars, and so I made a table of the calorific values of the various food he had to eat – types of food that would not harm his kidneys – and I kept an up-to-date daily record of his albumins, of the specific gravity of his urine, the level of urea in his blood, of his diuresis, etc., so I would have an indication of the process of the disease. The sad truth was quite different: my son was gradually wasting away with progressive muscular dystrophy. He was dying of that terrible disease which no one has ever been able to understand or cure, and against which there is no defense, aside from genetic prophylaxis (i.e. a medication or a treatment designed and used to prevent a disease from occurring)."

— Ferrari, Enzo, via Gino Rancati, Enzo Ferrari: The Man (1988), p. 87–88

The death of Alfredo took a toll on his parents' marriage. His mother, Laura Dominica Garello, never got over the loss of her only son, and her behaviour became increasingly erratic and unstable.

Piero Ferrari, Dino's younger half-brother who was born out-of-wedlock to Enzo Ferrari and mistress Lina Lardi on 22 May 1945, and who became Enzo's heir after Dino's death, has stated: "I never knew Dino, but I have never felt I was a victim of his memory, or of the pain that my father, Enzo, had always felt because of his death. And I would not be sincere if I did not say that when I was recognized [in 1978, after Laura's death], I experienced a great deal of emotion."

Gino Rancati said: "Piero is now a man, with a family of his own, but his father [Enzo]'s obsession with Dino's memory must have left a mark on him."

== Legacy ==
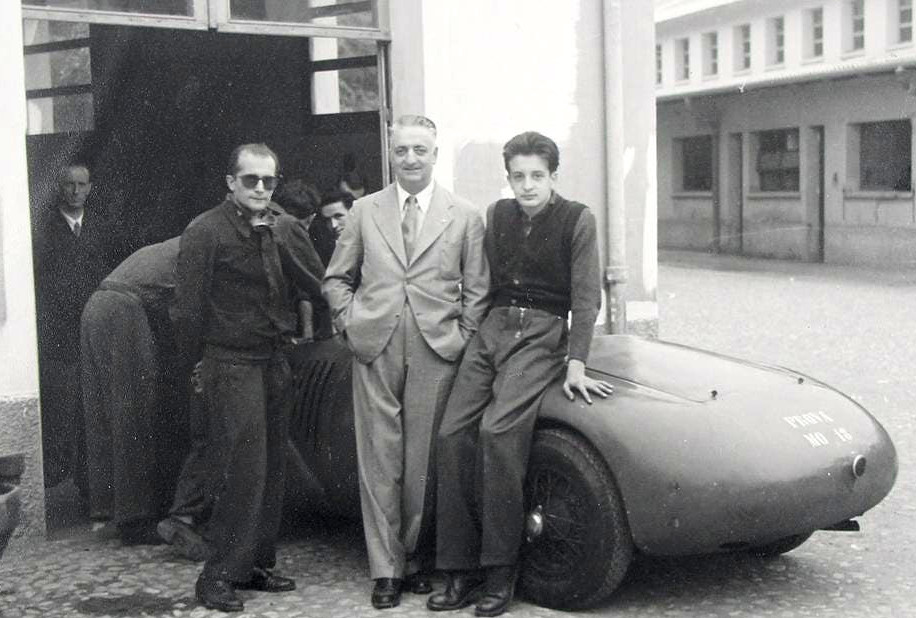
Enzo Ferrari (centre), Dino (right) and Nando (left, sunglasses) with Ferrari 125 S in 1947

Dino Ferrari is probably best-known posthumously for designing the Ferrari Dino engine, a series of V6s and V8s that were produced by Ferrari from the late 1950s into the early 2000s; and the Dino, a marque best known for mid-engined, rear-drive sports cars produced by Ferrari from 1957 to 1976.

The marque came into existence in late 1956, with a front-engined Formula Two racer powered by a brand new Ferrari Dino V6 engine. The name "Dino" was also used for some models with engines smaller than 12 cylinders; it was an attempt by the company to offer a relatively low-cost sports car. The Ferrari name remained reserved for its premium V12 and flat-12 models until 1976, when "Dino" was retired in favour of full Ferrari branding.

Alongside engineer Vittorio Jano, Dino persuaded his father, Enzo Ferrari, to produce a line of racing cars in the 1950s with V6 and V8 engines. The script that adorns the badge and cylinder head covers was based on Dino's own signature.

In 1962, Enzo Ferrari launched the Premio Giornalistico Dino Ferrari (the Dino Ferrari Prize for Journalism) in memory of his son, originally with a prize of 500,000 lira. The prize money was later increased to 1 million lira, in addition to a small bronze statuette of the Ferrari emblem, the Prancing Horse. Writers Gino Rancati, Giovanni Arpino, and Alberto Bevilacqua, among others, have been recipients of this annual award.

The Autodromo Enzo e Dino Ferrari in Imola, Italy was originally named the "Autodromo Dino Ferrari" in Alfredo's honour, with his father's name added after Enzo's death in 1988. The 1979 Dino Ferrari Grand Prix was held there on 16 September 1979.

Dino's half-brother, Piero, also actively supports Centro Dino Ferrari, a research centre for neurodegenerative and muscular diseases at the University of Milan, located in the Clinical Neurology Institute at the University Polyclinic of Milan. The centre was named after Dino and co-founded by their father, Enzo Ferrari, with Prof. Guglielmo Scarlato (1931–2002) in 1978.

He was portrayed by Benedetto Benedettini in Ferrari (2023), which centred on his father's grief and the 1957 Mille Miglia. He was portrayed by Matthew Bose in Ferrari (2003).

== Bibliography ==
- Pritchard, Anthony (2009). Ferrari: Men from Maranello. Haynes Publishing. p. 98. ISBN 978-1-84425-414-9.
- Rancati, Gino (1988). Enzo Ferrari: The Man. Haynes Publishing. ISBN 0-85429-762-6.
