= HPE COXA =

Italian engineering company

- Company type: Private company
- Industry: Engineering
- Founded: 1998; 28 years ago
- Founder: Piero Ferrari
- Headquarters: Modena, Italy
- Key people: Piero Ferrari (Chairman); Marco Bonometti (Co Chairman); Andrea Bozzoli (CEO)
- Services: Engineering services and precision manufacturing
- Revenue: EUR€ 33 million (2021)
- Number of employees: 250
- Website: www.hpe.eu

HPE COXA is an Italian company that provides engineering services and precision manufacturing for automotive, motorsport, automation solutions, aerospace, and defense sectors. Its headquarters is located in Modena, which is the core of the Italian Motor Valley part of the automotive industry in Italy.

== History ==
HPE was founded in 1998 by Piero Ferrari, with the aim of providing high-end engineering services in the mechanical field. In 2010 HPE acquired COXA, a manufacturing firm founded in 1985 and specialized in the high precision manufacturing of niche volumes and prototypes.

Since the acquisition, HPE COXA has doubled its turnover and its employees, with a mean yearly growth rate of 24.5%. Today the company is able to manage for its customers the whole product chain from concept to manufacturing.

The company currently holds 4 certifications (UNI EN ISO 9001: 2008, UNI EN ISO 14001: 2004, BH OHSAS 18001: 2007, ISO/TS 16949: 2009).
