= Piero Ferrari =

Italian billionaire businessman

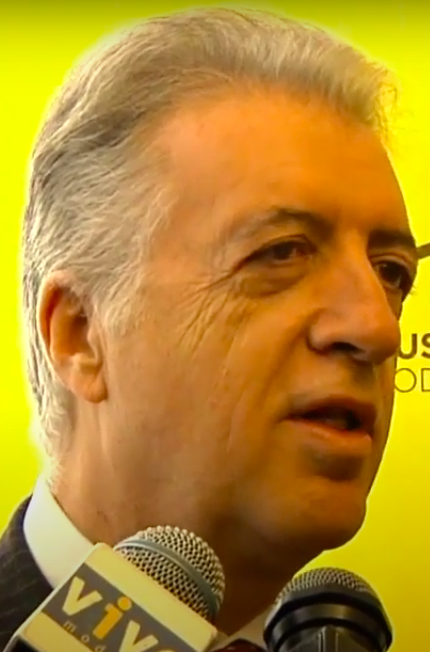
- Ferrari in 2012
- Born: Piero Lardi; 22 May 1945 (age 81); Castelvetro di Modena, Kingdom of Italy
- Occupation: Businessman
- Title: Vice Chairman, Ferrari; Chairman, HPE COXA
- Board member of: Ferrari; Ferretti Group
- Spouse(s): Floriana Nalin (m. 1979; div. 2020) Romina Gingașu (m. 2021)
- Children: Antonella Ferrari (daughter)
- Parents: Enzo Ferrari (father); Lina Lardi (mother)
- Relatives: Dino Ferrari (half-brother)
- Family: Ferrari

Piero Ferrari (born Piero Lardi, 22 May 1945; later Piero Lardi Ferrari) is an Italian billionaire businessman and sport personality. He is the second and only living son of Enzo Ferrari, and a 10.48% owner of the Ferrari automotive company, of which he is the vice chairman. He owns 13.2% of the Ferretti Group. As of February 2025, his net worth was estimated at US$10.2 billion.

== Early life ==
Piero Ferrari is the son of Enzo Ferrari (20 February 1898 – 14 August 1988) and his mistress, Lina Lardi (1911–2006). He is also the younger half-brother of Dino Ferrari (1932–1956). Dino had been diagnosed with Duchenne muscular dystrophy, and died at the age of 24. Piero never met his older brother, despite being 11 years old at the time of Dino's death.

After Dino's death, Enzo made Piero one of his principal heirs, giving him a 10% stake in the Ferrari company. Enzo had met Lina Lardi in the late 1930s, when she was working at Carrozzerie Orlandi, a coachbuilder company in Modena. The two began a romantic affair soon after; their son, Piero, was born on 22 May 1945; and Enzo and Lina continued their relationship until Ferrari's death in 1988. As divorce was illegal in Italy until 1975, Piero could not be acknowledged as a Ferrari family member until the death of Enzo's estranged wife, Laura, on 27 February 1978. In 1990, he legally changed his name from Piero Lardi Ferrari to Piero Ferrari.

Ferrari grew up in Modena. He became passionate about mechanics by hanging out in a bike repair shop close to his mother's home. In 1964, he obtained a high school diploma with the mechanics course of the Fermo Corni Technical Institute in Modena, an istituto tecnico industriale.

== Career at Ferrari ==
In 1969 Ferrari started working informally for the family company as an English translator for his father. In the early 1970s he was officially hired as technical supervisor, with the task of listing, describing and archiving defective or ineffective car components. One of his early jobs was taking the drawings and parts of the 196 Dino to the GT department, acting as a bridge between the road car and racing division. In doing so, he earned considerable experience about the operational dynamics of the factory.

In 1974 he was moved to the Formula One team, where he worked as a co-organiser, assisting sporting directors Luca Cordero di Montezemolo and Daniele Audetto. In the mid-1980s he became supervisor of the production of road cars, where he helped developing concepts for the low-volume Ferrari F40, Ferrari F50 and LaFerrari.

In 1988, when Enzo Ferrari died, Piero was the sole heir of the Ferrari family and inherited his father's 10% share of the company and the ownership of the Fiorano Circuit. In 1989 he was nominated vice chairman by Ferrari's then president Vittorio Ghidella.

On the occasion of the 2013 Chinese Grand Prix, won by Fernando Alonso, Ferrari's then team principal Stefano Domenicali persuaded Piero Ferrari to collect the trophy for the team. It was the first time in the history of Scuderia Ferrari that a Ferrari family member would step on the podium of a Formula One race.

== Business ventures ==
In 1998, Ferrari teamed up with José Di Mase and purchased Piaggio Aero Engineering with the idea of bringing Piaggio back to its roots as a designer and producer of business aircraft. Ferrari was nominated president. He resigned in 2015 when he sold the final 1.95% of his shares to Mubadala Development Company. The connection proved fruitful as Ferrari was then able to persuade Mubadala to become a title sponsor of the Ferrari Formula One Team the following year. Ferrari is also the chairman of HPE COXA, a company he founded in 1998 with the aim of providing high end engineering services in the mechanical field. In 2009 HPE acquired COXA, a manufacturing firm founded in 1985 which specialized in the high precision manufacturing of niche volumes and prototypes.

Following Ferrari's IPO on 21 October 2015, his 10% stake was valued at US$1.1 billion. On 28 April 2016, he entered into the Ferretti Group with 13.2% of shares. In May 2019, he was ranked by Forbes at number 838 in the world's billionaires list with a net worth of $3.1 billion. Also in 2019, he acquired the first mega yacht built by Riva—the 50m "RACE"—that launched the new superyacht division of the Ferretti Group. In April 2020, he was ranked by Forbes at number 680 in the world's billionaires list with a net worth of $3.4 billion. In December 2020, he increased his stake in Ferrari up to 10.23%. In June 2021, he was ranked by Forbes at number 705 in the world's billionaires list with a net worth of $4.7 billion.

== Honours ==
Ferrari was awarded the title of Cavaliere del Lavoro in 2004. In 2004, he received an honorary degree in aerospace engineering from the University of Naples. In 2013 he was awarded the Lorenzo Bandini Trophy. In 2021 he received the Mecenate dello Sport Award in Latina.

== Personal life ==
Ferrari was very close to his paternal grandmother, Adalgisa Bisbini (1872–1965). In 1979 he married Floriana Nalin. The couple divorced in 2020. They had one daughter, Antonella, and two grandsons – Enzo and Piero. In 2021 Ferrari married aeronautic engineer Romina Gingașu. Ferrari lives with Gingașu in Modena in his father's old residence.

Ferrari also actively supports Centro Dino Ferrari, a research center for neurodegenerative and muscular diseases at the University of Milan, located in the Clinical Neurology Institute at the University Polyclinic of Milan. The center was named for his half-brother, Dino Ferrari, after the latter died at age 24 due to Duchenne muscular dystrophy, and was co-founded by their father, Enzo Ferrari, with Professor Guglielmo Scarlato (1931–2002) in 1978.

== Film and television ==
- He was portrayed by Pietro Ragusa in Carlo Carlei's 2003 film Ferrari, which is based on Enzo Ferrari's biography written by journalist Enzo Biagi.
- He was portrayed by Giuseppe Festinese in Michael Mann's 2023 film Ferrari, which centered his father's struggles for his second family and the 1957 Mille Miglia.

== Bibliography ==
- Pritchard, Anthony (2009). Ferrari: Men from Maranello. Haynes Publishing. p. 100. ISBN 978-1-84425-414-9.
- Rancati, Gino (1988). Enzo Ferrari: The Man. Haynes Publishing. ISBN 0-85429-762-6.

Awards and achievements
Preceded by Bruno Senna	Lorenzo Bandini Trophy; 2013	Succeeded by Daniel Ricciardo
