= Massimo Rivola =

Italian motorsport official (born 1971)

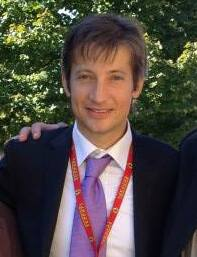
- Rivola in 2013
- Born: 7 December 1971 (age 54); Faenza, Italy
- Education: University of Bologna
- Employer: Aprilia Racing

Massimo Rivola (born 7 December 1971) is an Italian motorsport official and since 2019 the CEO for Aprilia Racing in MotoGP.

== Career ==
Rivola was born in Faenza on 7 December 1971. After graduating in 1996 in economics and commerce at the University of Bologna, he began his career in Formula One in 1998 at the marketing office of the Faenza-based Minardi. In 2000, he became sponsor of Minardi. By 2002, he was appointed marketing manager. In 2003, again at Minardi, he was appointed deputy team manager. In 2005, he became sporting director and team manager. After the acquisition of Minardi by Red Bull GmbH and subsequent renaming into Scuderia Toro Rosso, he remained in Faenza as team manager from 2006 to 2008.

In 2009, Rivola arrived at Scuderia Ferrari, where he went to occupy the position of sporting director, working among others with drivers such as Fernando Alonso and Sebastian Vettel; again in the Maranello outfit, he became director of the Ferrari Driver Academy in 2016, contributing to launch the promising Charles Leclerc in the top racing series. After ten years in Maranello, he left Ferrari and Formula One in 2019 to move to the motorcycle World Championship as CEO of the Aprilia team in MotoGP.
